= 2018–19 Arizona Wildcats men's basketball team =

American college basketball season

2018–19 Arizona Wildcats men's basketball
- Conference: Pac-12 Conference
- Record: 17–15 (8–10 Pac-12)
- Head coach: Sean Miller (10th season)
- Assistant coaches: Mark Phelps; Danny Peters; Justin Gainey
- Home arena: McKale Center

2018–19 Pac-12 Conference men's basketball standings
	Conf.				Overall
Team	W		L	PCT	W		L	PCT
Washington	15	–	3	.833	27	–	9	.750
Arizona State	12	–	6	.667	23	–	11	.676
Utah	11	–	7	.611	17	–	14	.548
Oregon State	10	–	8	.556	18	–	13	.581
Colorado	10	–	8	.556	23	–	13	.639
Oregon †	10	–	8	.556	25	–	13	.658
UCLA	9	–	9	.500	17	–	16	.515
USC	8	–	10	.444	16	–	17	.485
Arizona	8	–	10	.444	17	–	15	.531
Stanford	8	–	10	.444	15	–	16	.484
Washington State	4	–	14	.222	11	–	21	.344
California	3	–	15	.167	8	–	23	.258
† Pac-12 Conference tournament winner

The 2018–19 Arizona Wildcats men's basketball team represented the University of Arizona during the 2018–19 NCAA Division I men's basketball season. The team was led by 10th-year head coach Sean Miller and played their home games at McKale Center in Tucson, Arizona as members of the Pac-12 Conference. They finished the season 17–15, 8–10 in Pac-12 play to finish in three-way tie for 6th place. They received the 9-seed in the 2019 Pac-12 tournament, where they lost to 8-seed USC in the first round, 78–65.

== Previous season ==
Entering the 2017–18 season, federal prosecutors in New York announced charges of fraud and corruption against 10 people involved in college basketball, including Arizona assistant coach Emmanuel "Book" Richardson. The charges allege that Richardson and others allegedly received payments from financial advisers and others to influence student-athletes to retain their services and in turn used those payments to secure recruits. Following the news, Richardson was suspended and relieved of all duties. On January 11, 2018, UA fired assistant basketball coach Book Richardson after his appeal failed.

On February 23, 2018, according to a published report by ESPN, an FBI wiretap revealed that head coach Sean Miller talked with Christian Dawkins (another key figure in the scandal) to discuss paying their top prospect, Deandre Ayton, $100,000 to commit to Arizona, with the monetary situation being dealt with directly with him. While Miller would not coach their next game that day against Oregon, Arizona allowed Ayton to play. Coach Sean Miller subsequently denied the allegation and the University of Arizona announced he will remain the coach of Arizona Wildcats men’s basketball team, with Ayton also allowed to continue playing with the team for the rest of the season. However, as a consequence of the report involving Ayton, both of Arizona's remaining committed recruits from the class of 2018, Shareef O'Neal and Brandon Williams, announced they had decommitted.

During the season, Arizona defeated Texas A&M in the Valley of the Sun Shootout in Phoenix, AZ. Arizona also defeated the same UMBC team that would go on to a historic upset of top-ranked Virginia in the NCAA tournament. Arizona lost to NC State, SMU and Purdue in the Battle 4 Atlantis in The Bahamas.

They finished the season 27–8, 14–4 in Pac-12 play to finish in a first place. The championship marked the school's 16th Pac-12 regular season championship title (back to back, 29th overall). As the No. 1 seed in the Pac-12 tournament, Arizona defeated Colorado, UCLA (avenged from 82–74 loss on February 4 in Tucson, AZ) and USC to win the 2nd straight Pac-12 tournament championship title for the 7th time. As a result, the Wildcats received the conference's automatic bid to the NCAA tournament for the sixth consecutive year (35th NCAA tournament appearances). As a No. 4 seed in the South region, in the First round, they lost to No. 13 seed Buffalo 89–68.

== Offseason ==
Offseason departures
Name	Position	Year	Hometown	Reason
Talbott Denny	G	GS Senior	Tucson, AZ	Graduated
Keanu Pinder	F	Senior	Perth, Australia	Graduated
Dušan Ristić	C	Senior	Novi Sad, Serbia	Graduated
Parker Jackson-Cartwright	G	Senior	Los Angeles, CA	Graduated
Tyler Trillo	G	RS Junior	Southbury, CT	Walk-on, Elected to graduate and transfer
Allonzo Trier	G	Junior	Seattle, WA	Declared for 2018 NBA draft
Rawle Alkins	G	Sophomore	Brooklyn, NY	Declared for 2018 NBA draft
Deandre Ayton	F	Freshman	Nassau, Bahamas	Declared for 2018 NBA draft

Incoming transfers
Name	Position	Year	Hometown	Previous School	Remaining Eligibility	Notes
Ryan Luther	F	Graduate Student	Gibsonia, PA	Pittsburgh	1	Luther will be eligible to play immediately for the 2018–19 season per NCAA transfer rules.
Justin Coleman	G	Graduate Student	Birmingham, AL	Samford	1	Coleman will be eligible to play immediately for the 2018–19 season per NCAA transfer rules.
Stone Gettings	F	Graduate Student	Malibu, CA	Cornell	1	Gettings will graduate from Cornell in December, redshirt the remainder of the season at Arizona, then play for the entire 2019–20 season.

=== 2018 recruiting class ===
Brandon Williams, originally from Los Angeles, CA was the first commitment in the Arizona class. He committed to Arizona on June 6, 2017, over Gonzaga, Kansas, UCLA and USC. He was a consensus four-star prospect. He backed out of his commitment to Arizona after more information relating to the 2017–18 NCAA Division I men's basketball corruption scandal came out (similar to former Arizona commit Shareef O'Neal), but he ultimately decided to stay with Arizona on May 5, 2018.

College recruiting
Name	Hometown	School	Height	Weight	Commit date
Brandon Williams; PG	Los Angeles, CA	Crespi Carmelite HS	6 ft 1 in (1.85 m)	178 lb (81 kg)	Jun 6, 2017
Brandon Williams; PG	Recruit ratings: Scout: Rivals: 247Sports: ESPN: (89)				
Devonaire Doutrive; SG	Inglewood, CA	Birmingham HS	6 ft 5 in (1.96 m)	180 lb (82 kg)	Apr 7, 2018
Devonaire Doutrive; SG	Recruit ratings: Scout: Rivals: 247Sports: ESPN: (85)				
Omar Thielemans; SF	Ostend, Belgium	B.C. Oostende	6 ft 7 in (2.01 m)	200 lb (91 kg)	Apr 15, 2018
Omar Thielemans; SF	Recruit ratings: Scout: Rivals: 247Sports: ESPN: (NR)				
Alec Spence; PG	St. Louis, MO	Mary Institute and Saint Louis Country Day School	6 ft 6 in (1.98 m)	160 lb (73 kg)	08/29/18 (Walk-On)
Alec Spence; PG	Recruit ratings: Scout: Rivals: 247Sports: ESPN: (NR)				
Overall recruit ranking:
Note: In many cases, Scout, Rivals, 247Sports, On3, and ESPN may conflict in their listings of height and weight.; In these cases, the average was taken. ESPN grades are on a 100-point scale.; Sources: "Arizona 2018 Basketball Commitments". Rivals.; "2018 Arizona Basketball Commits". Scout.; "2018 Arizona Wildcats Recruiting Class". ESPN.; "Scout.com Team Recruiting Rankings". Scout.; "2018 Team Ranking". Rivals.; "2018 Arizona 24/7 Sports Commits". 247Sports.

=== 2019 recruiting class ===
Nico Mannion, originally from Siena, Italy, was originally a part of the 2020 recruiting class, but reclassified to the 2019 class in July 2018. He verbally committed to Arizona on September 14, 2018, over Marquette. Mannion is a consensus five-star prospect out of Pinnacle HS in Phoenix, Arizona.

Christian Koloko, originally from Doula, Cameroon, was the second commitment in the Arizona class. He committed to Arizona on September 23, 2018, over California, Creighton, and Vanderbilt. He is a consensus three-star prospect out of Sierra Canyon School in Chatsworth, California.

Josh Green, originally from Sydney, New South Wales, Australia was the third commitment in the Arizona’s 2019 recruiting class. He verbally committed to Arizona on October 4, 2018, over Kansas, North Carolina, Villanova, USC and UNLV. Green is a consensus five-star prospect out of IMG Academy in Bradenton, Florida.

Zeke Nnaji, originally from Lakeville, MN was the fifth commitment in the Arizona’s 2019 recruiting class. He verbally committed to Arizona on November 23, 2018, over UCLA, North Carolina, Kansas and Purdue. Nnaji is a consensus four-star prospect out of Hopkins High School in Minnetonka, Minnesota.

College recruiting (2019)
Name	Hometown	School	Height	Weight	Commit date
Nico Mannion; PG	Siena, Italy	Pinnacle HS (AZ)	6 ft 3 in (1.91 m)	180 lb (82 kg)	Sep 14, 2018
Nico Mannion; PG	Recruit ratings: Scout: Rivals: 247Sports: ESPN: (96)				
Christian Koloko; C	Doula, Cameroon	Sierra Canyon School (CA)	7 ft 0 in (2.13 m)	195 lb (88 kg)	Sep 23, 2018
Christian Koloko; C	Recruit ratings: Scout: Rivals: 247Sports: ESPN: (79)				
Josh Green; G/F	Sydney, New South Wales, Australia	IMG Academy (FL)	6 ft 6 in (1.98 m)	190 lb (86 kg)	Oct 4, 2018
Josh Green; G/F	Recruit ratings: Scout: Rivals: 247Sports: ESPN: (96)				
Zeke Nnaji; C	Lakeville, MN	Hopkins HS	6 ft 11 in (2.11 m)	230 lb (100 kg)	Nov 23, 2018
Zeke Nnaji; C	Recruit ratings: Scout: Rivals: 247Sports: ESPN: (88)				
Overall recruit ranking: Scout: #1 Rivals: #1 247Sports: #1 ESPN: #1
Note: In many cases, Scout, Rivals, 247Sports, On3, and ESPN may conflict in their listings of height and weight.; In these cases, the average was taken. ESPN grades are on a 100-point scale.; Sources: "Arizona 2019 Basketball Commitments". Rivals.; "2019 Arizona Basketball Commits". Scout.; "2019 Arizona Wildcats Recruiting Class". ESPN.; "Scout.com Team Recruiting Rankings". Scout.; "2019 Team Ranking". Rivals.; "2019 Arizona 24/7 Sports Commits". 247Sports.

== Roster/Personnel ==
=== Roster ===
2018–19 Arizona Wildcats men's basketball team
Players
Coaches

Pos.	#	Name	Height	Weight	Year	Previous school	Hometown
G	1	Devonaire Doutrive	6 ft 5 in (1.96 m)	175 lb (79 kg)	Fr	Birmingham HS	Dallas, TX
G	2	Brandon Williams	6 ft 2 in (1.88 m)	190 lb (86 kg)	Fr	Crespi Carmelite HS	Los Angeles, CA
G	3	Dylan Smith	6 ft 5 in (1.96 m)	170 lb (77 kg)	RS Jr	UNC Asheville	Mobile, AL
F/C	4	Chase Jeter (C)	6 ft 10 in (2.08 m)	230 lb (104 kg)	RS Jr	Duke	Las Vegas, NV
G	5	Brandon Randolph	6 ft 6 in (1.98 m)	175 lb (79 kg)	So	Westtown School	Yonkers, NY
F	10	Ryan Luther	6 ft 9 in (2.06 m)	225 lb (102 kg)	GS	Pittsburgh	Gibsonia, PA
F	11	Ira Lee	6 ft 7 in (2.01 m)	235 lb (107 kg)	So	Crossroads School	Los Angeles, CA
G	12	Justin Coleman (C)	5 ft 10 in (1.78 m)	170 lb (77 kg)	GS	Samford	Birmingham, AL
G	23	Alex Barcello	6 ft 2 in (1.88 m)	180 lb (82 kg)	So	Corona del Sol HS	Chandler, AZ
G	50	Alec Spence (W)	6 ft 6 in (1.98 m)	195 lb (88 kg)	Fr	MICDS	St. Louis, MO
G	52	Kory Jones (W)	6 ft 3 in (1.91 m)	170 lb (77 kg)	RS So	Westfield HS	Herndon, VA
F	54	Matt Weyand (W)	6 ft 5 in (1.96 m)	190 lb (86 kg)	So	Mater Dei HS	Irvine, CA
F	55	Jake DesJardins	6 ft 6 in (1.98 m)	215 lb (98 kg)	Jr	Coronado HS	Henderson, NV

Head coach

- Sean Miller (Pittsburgh)

Assistant coach(es)

- Mark Phelps (Old Dominion)
- Danny Peters (Ohio State)
- Justin Gainey (NC State)

Legend

- (C) Team captain
- (S) Suspended
- (I) Ineligible
- (W) Walk-on
- Injured
- Current redshirt

Roster
Last update: February 24, 2019

- Oct. 16, 2018 - Freshman Omar Thielemans elected to leave program.
- Jan. 14, 2019 - Sophomore Emmanuel Akot quit the team; to transfer after the Spring semester.
- Feb 1, 2019 - Freshman Brandon Williams out indefinitely with a right knee injury. Returned on February 24 against Stanford after missing six games.

==== Depth chart ====
Pos.	Starting 5	Bench 1	Bench 2	Bench 3
C	Chase Jeter
PF	Ryan Luther	Ira Lee	Jake DesJardins
SF	Brandon Randolph	Emmanuel Akot		Matt Weyand
SG	Brandon Williams	Dylan Smith	Devonaire Doutrive	Alec Spence
PG	Justin Coleman	Alex Barcello		Kory Jones

=== Coaching staff ===
Name	Position	Year at Arizona	Alma Mater (year)
Sean Miller	Head Coach	10th	Pittsburgh (1992)
Mark Phelps	Assistant Coach	4th	Old Dominion (1996)
Danny Peters	Assistant Coach	1st	Ohio State (2010)
Justin Gainey	Assistant Coach	1st	NC State (2000)
Ryan Reynolds	Director of Basketball Operations	10th	Xavier (2007)
Austin Carroll	Assistant Director of Basketball Operations	3rd	American (2014)

== Preseason ==
=== Red and Blue game ===
The annual Red-Blue game will take place at McKale Center on October 14, 2018. After sophomore Brandon Randolph defended his crown in the dunk contest, the Red team, led by Ira Lee, knocked off the Blue team, 39-33.

=== Preseason rankings ===
The Arizona Wildcats were selected fourth in the 2018-19 Pac-12 media poll. On October 22, Arizona began the season unranked receiving 14 votes in the AP poll. It was the first time since the 2010–11, began the season not in the AP Poll.

== Schedule and results ==
The Wildcats opponents were finalized in the summer and dates and times will be finalized in the fall. Current confirmed opponents are exhibition games against Division II school Chaminade, Baylor, Cal Poly, Houston Baptist, Montana, Georgia Southern, UC Davis, UTEP and Utah Valley. They will also participate in the 2018 Maui Invitational Tournament with three of the following potential opponents including (Auburn, Duke, Gonzaga, Illinois, Iowa State, San Diego, or Xavier). Arizona has two true away games with Alabama at Coleman Coliseum, and UConn at the XL Center. In the unbalanced 18-game Pac-12 schedule, Arizona will not play the two Washington schools on the road (Washington and Washington State) and two Los Angeles schools at home (UCLA and USC).

Date time, TV	Rank^{#}	Opponent^{#}	Result	Record	High points	High rebounds	High assists	Site (attendance) city, state
Exhibition
October 30, 2018*; 7:00 pm, P12N		Western New Mexico	W 95–44	–	20 – Randolph	8 – Luther	6 – Coleman	McKale Center (12,745); Tucson, AZ
November 4, 2018*; 7:00 pm, P12N		Chaminade	W 75–64	–	23 – Williams	6 – Jeter	3 – 2 Tied	McKale Center (12,543); Tucson, AZ
Non-conference regular season
November 7, 2018*; 7:00 pm, P12N		Houston Baptist; Maui Invitational campus-site game	W 90–60	1–0	21 – Randolph	10 – Jeter	4 – Williams	McKale Center (13,749); Tucson, AZ
November 11, 2018*; 3:00 pm, P12N		Cal Poly	W 82–61	2–0	17 – Luther	8 – Lee	8 – Williams	McKale Center (13,995); Tucson, AZ
November 14, 2018*; 6:00 pm, P12N		UTEP	W 79–46	3–0	21 – Tied	7 – Lee	5 – Coleman	McKale Center (13,651); Tucson, AZ
November 19, 2018*; 7:00 pm, ESPNU		vs. Iowa State; Maui Invitational quarterfinals	W 71–66	4–0	18 – Coleman	14 – Jeter	6 – Williams	Lahaina Civic Center (2,400); Maui, HI
November 20, 2018*; 8:00 pm, ESPN		vs. No. 3 Gonzaga; Maui Invitational semifinals	L 74–91	4–1	28 – Coleman	8 – Luther	2 – Williams	Lahaina Civic Center (2,400); Maui, HI
November 21, 2018*; 9:30 pm, ESPN2		vs. No. 8 Auburn; Maui Invitational 3rd place game	L 57–73	4–2	18 – Randolph	5 – Tied	5 – Coleman	Lahaina Civic Center (2,400); Maui, HI
November 29, 2018*; 7:00 pm, P12N		Georgia Southern	W 100–70	5–2	18 – Jeter	10 – Jeter	6 – Williams	McKale Center (13,486); Tucson, AZ
December 2, 2018*; 11:00 am, ESPN2		at UConn	W 76–72	6–2	20 – Randolph	7 – Jeter	3 – Williams	XL Center (14,603); Hartford, CT
December 6, 2018*; 7:00 pm, P12N		Utah Valley	W 80–69	7–2	16 – Randolph	10 – Williams	5 – Williams	McKale Center (13,724); Tucson, AZ
December 9, 2018*; 11:00 am, ESPN		at Alabama	L 73–76	7–3	19 – Jeter	9 – Jeter	6 – Coleman	Coleman Coliseum (9,581); Tuscaloosa, AL
December 15, 2018*; 9:00 pm, ESPN2		Baylor	L 49–58	7–4	15 – Randolph	5 – Lee	4 – Williams	McKale Center (13,058); Tucson, AZ
December 19, 2018*; 6:30 pm, P12N		Montana	W 61–42	8–4	21 – Jeter	6 – Tied	4 – Coleman	McKale Center (12,925); Tucson, AZ
December 22, 2018*; 5:00 pm, P12N		UC Davis	W 70–68	9–4	16 – Jeter	8 – Randolph	3 – Williams	McKale Center (13,576); Tucson, AZ
Pac-12 regular season
January 3, 2019; 7:00 pm, FS1		Colorado	W 64–56	10–4 (1–0)	14 – Williams	8 – Jeter	6 – Williams	McKale Center (13,511); Tucson, AZ
January 5, 2019; 12:00 pm, P12N		Utah	W 84–81 ^{OT}	11–4 (2–0)	21 – Tied	13 – Jeter	4 – Jeter	McKale Center (13,764); Tucson, AZ
January 9, 2019; 9:00 pm, P12N		at Stanford	W 75–70	12–4 (3–0)	17 – Randolph	8 – Randolph	4 – Coleman	Maples Pavilion (3,909); Stanford, CA
January 12, 2019; 8:30 pm, P12N		at California	W 87–65	13–4 (4–0)	23 – Jeter	9 – Jeter	5 – Coleman	Haas Pavilion (7,868); Berkeley, CA
January 17, 2019; 7:00 pm, ESPN		Oregon	L 54–59	13–5 (4–1)	12 – Jeter	10 – Jeter	4 – Coleman	McKale Center (14,032); Tucson, AZ
January 19, 2019; 5:00 pm, P12N		Oregon State	W 82–71	14–5 (5–1)	21 – Williams	11 – Ryan	5 – 2 Tied	McKale Center (14,410); Tucson, AZ
January 24, 2019; 7:00 pm, FS1		at USC	L 57–80	14–6 (5–2)	12 – 2 tied	7 – Lee	5 – Ryan	Galen Center (4,152); Los Angeles, CA
January 26, 2019; 8:00 pm, ESPN2		at UCLA; Rivalry	L 69–90	14–7 (5–3)	19 – Williams	7 – Lee	4 – Coleman	Pauley Pavilion (11,164); Los Angeles, CA
January 31, 2019; 7:00 pm, ESPN2		at Arizona State; Rivalry	L 88−95 ^{OT}	14−8 (5−4)	19 – 2 tied	9 – Luther	9 – Coleman	Wells Fargo Arena (14,731); Tempe, AZ
February 7, 2019; 7:00 pm, ESPN2		Washington	L 60–67	14–9 (5–5)	16 – Coleman	6 – Lee	5 – Randolph	McKale Center (13,732); Tucson, AZ
February 9, 2019; 5:30 pm, P12N		Washington State	L 55–69	14–10 (5–6)	14 – Coleman	11 – Doutrive	3 – Coleman	McKale Center (14,145); Tucson, AZ
February 14, 2019; 7:00 pm, ESPNU		at Utah	L 76−83	14−11 (5−7)	16 – Smith	8 – Lee	4 – Doutrive	Jon M. Huntsman Center (11,478); Salt Lake City, UT
February 17, 2019; 6:00 pm, ESPNU		at Colorado	L 60–67	14–12 (5–8)	17 – Luther	8 – Jeter	9 – Coleman	CU Events Center (7,899); Boulder, CO
February 21, 2019; 7:00 pm, FS1		California	W 76–51	15–12 (6–8)	19 – Luther	7 – Jeter	8 – Coleman	McKale Center (13,737); Tucson, AZ
February 24, 2019; 6:00 pm, ESPN2		Stanford	W 70–54	16–12 (7–8)	16 – Lee	7 – Coleman	5 – Coleman	McKale Center (13,859); Tucson, AZ
February 28, 2019; 7:00 pm, FS1		at Oregon State	W 74–72	17–12 (8–8)	15 – Randolph	6 – 2 tied	3 – Coleman	Gill Coliseum (5,468); Corvallis, OR
March 2, 2019; 8:00 pm, ESPN2		at Oregon	L 47–73	17–13 (8–9)	14 – Smith	8 – Doutrive	2 – 3 tied	Matthew Knight Arena (11,339); Eugene, OR
March 9, 2019; 2:00 pm, CBS		Arizona State; Rivalry	L 64–72	17–14 (8–10)	12 – 2 tied	7 – Smith	4 – Coleman	McKale Center (14,291); Tucson, AZ
Pac-12 Tournament
March 13, 2019; 12:00 pm, P12N	(9)	vs. (8) USC; First round	L 65−78	17−15	16 – Luther	7 – Jeter	3 – Coleman	T-Mobile Arena (9,748); Paradise, NV
*Non-conference game. ^{#}Rankings from AP Poll. (#) Tournament seedings in parentheses. All times are in Mountain Time.

== Rankings ==
Ranking movements Legend: ██ Increase in ranking ██ Decrease in ranking — = Not ranked RV = Received votes
	Week																			
Poll	Pre	1	2	3	4	5	6	7	8	9	10	11	12	13	14	15	16	17	18	Final
AP	RV	RV	—	—	RV	—	—	—	—	—	—	RV	—	—	—	—	—	—	—	Not released
Coaches	RV	RV	RV	—	—	RV	—	—	—	—	RV	—	—	—	—	—	—	—	—	—

*AP does not release post-NCAA Tournament rankings

== Player statistics ==
Individual player statistics (Final)
			Minutes		Scoring		Total FGs			3-point FGs			Free-Throws			Rebounds							
Player	GP	GS	Tot	Avg	Pts	Avg	FG	FGA	Pct	3FG	3FA	Pct	FT	FTA	Pct	Off	Def	Tot	Avg	A	TO	Stl	Blk
Alec Spence	0	0	0	0	0	0	0	0	0	0	0	0	0	0	0	0	0	0	0	0	0	0	0
Alex Barcello	0	0	0	0	0	0	0	0	0	0	0	0	0	0	0	0	0	0	0	0	0	0	0
Brandon Randolph	0	0	0	0	0	0	0	0	0	0	0	0	0	0	0	0	0	0	0	0	0	0	0
Brandon Williams	0	0	0	0	0	0	0	0	0	0	0	0	0	0	0	0	0	0	0	0	0	0	0
Chase Jeter	0	0	0	0	0	0	0	0	0	0	0	0	0	0	0	0	0	0	0	0	0	0	0
Devonaire Doutrive	0	0	0	0	0	0	0	0	0	0	0	0	0	0	0	0	0	0	0	0	0	0	0
Dylan Smith	0	0	0	0	0	0	0	0	0	0	0	0	0	0	0	0	0	0	0	0	0	0	0
Emmanuel Akot	0	0	0	0	0	0	0	0	0	0	0	0	0	0	0	0	0	0	0	0	0	0	0
Ira Lee	0	0	0	0	0	0	0	0	0	0	0	0	0	0	0	0	0	0	0	0	0	0	0
Jake DesJardins	0	0	0	0	0	0	0	0	0	0	0	0	0	0	0	0	0	0	0	0	0	0	0
Justin Coleman	0	0	0	0	0	0	0	0	0	0	0	0	0	0	0	0	0	0	0	0	0	0	0
Kory Jones	0	0	0	0	0	0	0	0	0	0	0	0	0	0	0	0	0	0	0	0	0	0	0
Matt Weyand	0	0	0	0	0	0	0	0	0	0	0	0	0	0	0	0	0	0	0	0	0	0	0
Ryan Luther	0	0	0	0	0	0	0	0	0	0	0	0	0	0	0	0	0	0	0	0	0	0	0
Total	-	-	-	-	-	-	-	-	-	-	-	-	-	-	-	-	-	-	-	-	-	-	-
Opponents																							

Legend
GP	Games played	GS	Games started	Avg	Average per game
FG	Field-goals made	FGA	Field-goal attempts	Off	Offensive rebounds
Def	Defensive rebounds	A	Assists	TO	Turnovers
Blk	Blocks	Stl	Steals	High	Team high

== See also ==
2018–19 Arizona Wildcats women's basketball team
