= 2019–20 UCLA Bruins men's basketball team =

American college basketball season

2019–20 UCLA Bruins men's basketball
- Conference: Pac-12 Conference
- Record: 19–12 (12–6 Pac-12)
- Head coach: Mick Cronin (1st season)
- Associate head coach: Darren Savino
- Assistant coaches: Rod Palmer; Michael Lewis
- Home arena: Pauley Pavilion (Capacity: 13,819)

2019–20 Pac-12 Conference men's basketball standings
	Conf.				Overall
Team	W		L	PCT	W		L	PCT
No. 13 Oregon	13	–	5	.722	24	–	7	.774
UCLA	12	–	6	.667	19	–	12	.613
USC	11	–	7	.611	22	–	9	.710
Arizona State	11	–	7	.611	20	–	11	.645
Arizona	10	–	8	.556	21	–	11	.656
Colorado	10	–	8	.556	21	–	11	.656
Stanford	9	–	9	.500	20	–	12	.625
Oregon State	7	–	11	.389	18	–	13	.581
Utah	7	–	11	.389	16	–	15	.516
California	7	–	11	.389	14	–	18	.438
Washington State	6	–	12	.333	16	–	16	.500
Washington	5	–	13	.278	15	–	17	.469
Note: The 2020 Pac-12 Tournament was canceled prior to the quarterfinals due to the COVID-19 pandemic. Rankings from AP poll

The 2019–20 UCLA Bruins men's basketball team represented the University of California, Los Angeles, during the 2019–20 NCAA Division I season. The Bruins were led by first-year head coach Mick Cronin and played their home games at Pauley Pavilion as members in the Pac-12 Conference. UCLA finished the season with a 19–12 record. After starting slowly at 8–9, they went 11–3 and finished second in the Pac-12 at 12–6. Cronin was named the Pac-12 Coach of the Year, while junior Chris Smith earned first-team All-Pac-12 honors and was voted the Pac-12 Most Improved Player. Due to the coronavirus pandemic, the Pac-12 tournament was canceled before the Bruins' first scheduled game in the quarterfinals, and the NCAA tournament was called off as well.

UCLA started the season 7–6 in non-conference play, including home losses to mid-major programs Hofstra and Cal State Fullerton. After beginning 1–3 in the Pac-12, they won seven of their next nine, including an upset win on the road against Arizona followed by consecutive 12-point second-half comebacks against Washington State and Washington. Still, the Bruins needed a strong finish to offset their early-season struggles and become contenders for an NCAA tournament bid. Their late-season surge continued with their fifth straight win, defeating No. 18 Colorado on the road to sweep the season series. UCLA erased a nine-point deficit in the second half with a 14–0 run and recorded 14 deflections in the final 13 minutes against the Buffaloes, which largely contributed to the Bruins' rise up 25 spots that week to No. 76 on the NCAA Evaluation Tool, one metric used by the NCAA tourney selection committee. UCLA extended its winning streak to seven after home wins against Arizona State and Arizona. It was the Bruins' first regular season sweep in their rivalry with the Wildcats since 2012–13. In their regular-season finale, UCLA lost 54–52 at USC after the Trojans made a game-winning three-point field goal with one second remaining. The Bruins earned a No. 2 seed and a first-round bye in the Pac-12 Tournament. On March 12, the Pac-12 canceled the tournament prior to its quarterfinals due to the coronavirus pandemic, and the NCAA Tournament was canceled later that day as well.

UCLA's roster consisted of mostly role players. For the first time since 1977–78, it did not include a McDonald's All-American; the honor began in 1977. The team's most high-profile player—Shareef O'Neal, the son of Hall of Fame player Shaquille O'Neal—transferred midseason after failing to earn regular playing time. Smith, who averaged 13.1 points per game, was the only Bruin to average in double figures.

== Previous season ==
The Bruins finished the 2018–19 season 17–16, 9–9 in Pac-12 play. They were led by sixth-year head coach Steve Alford until he was fired mid-season and assistant Murry Bartow was named the interim head coach. Their lineup featured three former McDonald's All-Americans: sophomores Jaylen Hands and Kris Wilkes were both named second-team All-Pac-12, while first-year player Moses Brown was voted to the Pac-12 All-Freshman Team. UCLA finished the season 17–16, and lost in the second round of the Pac-12 tournament. They missed the postseason for the second time in four years.

== Off-season ==
=== Departures ===
Name	Pos.	Height	Weight	Year	Hometown	Reason for departure
Jaylen Hands	PG	6'3"	180	Sophomore	San Diego, California	Declared for the 2019 NBA draft; selected 56th overall by the Los Angeles Clippers.
Kris Wilkes	F	6'8"	215	Sophomore	Indianapolis, Indiana	Declared for the 2019 NBA Draft.
Moses Brown	C	7'1"	245	Freshman	Queens, New York	Declared for the 2019 NBA Draft.

=== 2019 recruiting class ===
College recruiting information
Name	Hometown	School	Height	Weight	Commit date
Jaime Jaquez Jr. F	Camarillo, California	Adolfo Camarillo HS	6 ft 7 in (2.01 m)	215 lb (98 kg)	May 8, 2018
Jaime Jaquez Jr. F	Recruit ratings: Rivals: 247Sports: ESPN: (83)				
Jake Kyman; F	Rancho Santa Margarita, California	SMCHS	6 ft 7 in (2.01 m)	190 lb (86 kg)	May 8, 2018
Jake Kyman; F	Recruit ratings: Rivals: 247Sports: ESPN: (80)				
Overall recruit ranking:
Note: In many cases, Scout, Rivals, 247Sports, On3, and ESPN may conflict in their listings of height and weight.; In these cases, the average was taken. ESPN grades are on a 100-point scale.; Sources: "2019 UCLA Commits". Rivals.; "2019 Team Ranking". Rivals.

== Roster ==
2019–20 UCLA Bruins men's basketball team
Players
Coaches

Pos.	#	Name	Height	Weight	Year	Previous school	Hometown
F	0	Alex Olesinski	6 ft 10 in (2.08 m)	225 lb (102 kg)	RS Sr	La Lumiere School	Roswell, NM
F	2	Cody Riley	6 ft 9 in (2.06 m)	250 lb (113 kg)	RS So	Sierra Canyon School	Kansas City, KS
G	3	Jules Bernard	6 ft 6 in (1.98 m)	205 lb (93 kg)	So	Windward School	Los Angeles, CA
G/F	4	Jaime Jaquez Jr.	6 ft 6 in (1.98 m)	215 lb (98 kg)	Fr	Camarillo HS	Camarillo, CA
G	5	Chris Smith	6 ft 9 in (2.06 m)	215 lb (98 kg)	Jr	Huntington Prep	Chicago, IL
G	10	Tyger Campbell	5 ft 11 in (1.8 m)	180 lb (82 kg)	RS Fr	La Lumiere School	Cedar Rapids, IA
G/F	13	Jake Kyman	6 ft 6 in (1.98 m)	215 lb (98 kg)	Fr	Santa Margarita Catholic HS	Aliso Viejo, CA
F	14	Kenneth Nwuba (redshirt)	6 ft 9 in (2.06 m)	250 lb (113 kg)	So	Huntington Prep	Lagos, Nigeria
G	15	Armani Dodson (W)	6 ft 5 in (1.96 m)	210 lb (95 kg)	Sr	Henry J. Kaiser HS	Fontana, CA
G	20	Isaac Wulff (W)	6 ft 3 in (1.91 m)	185 lb (84 kg)	Sr	Laguna Beach HS	Laguna Beach, CA
F	22	Shareef O'Neal (T)	6 ft 9 in (2.06 m)	220 lb (100 kg)	RS Fr	Crossroads School	Los Angeles, CA
G	23	Prince Ali	6 ft 4 in (1.93 m)	195 lb (88 kg)	RS Sr	Sagemont School	The Bronx, NY
F/C	24	Jalen Hill	6 ft 10 in (2.08 m)	245 lb (111 kg)	RS So	Centennial HS	Corona, CA
G	34	David Singleton	6 ft 4 in (1.93 m)	205 lb (93 kg)	So	Bishop Montgomery HS	Los Angeles, CA
G	43	Russell Stong (W)	6 ft 2 in (1.88 m)	185 lb (84 kg)	So	Crespi Carmelite HS	Northridge, CA

Head coach

- Mick Cronin (Cincinnati)

Assistant coach(es)

- Darren Savino (New Jersey City)
- Rod Palmer (UC Irvine)
- Michael Lewis (Indiana)

Legend

- (C) Team captain
- (S) Suspended
- (I) Ineligible
- (W) Walk-on
- (T) Transferred
- Injured
- Current redshirt

Roster

== Schedule and results ==
Date time, TV	Rank^{#}	Opponent^{#}	Result	Record	High points	High rebounds	High assists	Site (attendance) city, state
Exhibition
October 30, 2019*; 7:30 pm, P12N		Stanislaus State	W 87–57	–	14 – Campbell	9 – Smith	11 – Campbell	Pauley Pavilion (3,221); Los Angeles, CA
Non–conference regular season
November 6, 2019*; 8:00 pm, P12N		Long Beach State	W 69–65	1–0	15 – Campbell	8 – Smith	5 – Campbell	Pauley Pavilion (6,265); Los Angeles, CA
November 10, 2019*; 4:00 pm, P12N		UCSB	W 77–61	2–0	22 – Hill	10 – Hill	6 – Campbell	Pauley Pavilion (6,235); Los Angeles, CA
November 15, 2019*; 8:00 pm, P12N		UNLV	W 71–54	3–0	16 – Smith	8 – Hill	4 – Tied	Pauley Pavilion (6,601); Los Angeles, CA
November 18, 2019*; 8:00 pm, P12N		Southern Utah; Maui Invitational campus-site game	W 76–61	4–0	20 – Smith	8 – Tied	5 – Campbell	Pauley Pavilion (4,427); Los Angeles, CA
November 21, 2019*; 8:00 pm, P12N		Hofstra	L 78–88	4–1	24 – Hill	12 – Hill	5 – Campbell	Pauley Pavilion (4,836); Los Angeles, CA
November 25, 2019*; 8:30 pm, ESPN2		vs. BYU; Maui Invitational quarterfinals	L 63–78	4–2	16 – Bernard	6 – Tied	6 – Smith	Lahaina Civic Center (2,400); Lahaina, HI
November 26, 2019*; 2:00 pm, ESPNU		vs. Chaminade; Maui Invitational 2nd round consolation	W 74–48	5–2	17 – Jaquez Jr.	12 – Jaquez Jr.	6 – Campbell	Lahaina Civic Center (2,400); Lahaina, HI
November 27, 2019*; 11:30 am, ESPN2		vs. No. 3 Michigan State; Maui Invitational 5th place game	L 62–75	5–3	13 – Smith	8 – Jaquez Jr.	2 – Riley	Lahaina Civic Center (2,400); Lahaina, HI
December 1, 2019*; 5:00 pm, P12N		San Jose State	W 93–64	6–3	18 – Tied	11 – Hill	4 – Tied	Pauley Pavilion (4,801); Los Angeles, CA
December 8, 2019*; 2:00 pm, P12N		Denver	W 81–62	7–3	21 – Riley	11 – Riley	4 – Jaquez Jr.	Pauley Pavilion (5,243); Los Angeles, CA
December 14, 2019*; 12:00 pm, ABC		at Notre Dame; Rivalry	L 61–75	7–4	10 – Smith	11 – O'Neal	2 – Tied	Edmund P. Joyce Center (8,083); South Bend, IN
December 21, 2019*; 12:00 pm, CBS		vs. North Carolina; CBS Sports Classic	L 64–74	7–5	16 – Bernard	10 – Jaquez Jr.	5 – Campbell	T-Mobile Arena (12,740); Paradise, NV
December 28, 2019*; 2:00 pm, P12N		Cal State Fullerton	L 74–77	7–6	18 – Campbell	10 – Hill	9 – Campbell	Pauley Pavilion (6,418); Los Angeles, CA
Pac-12 regular season
January 2, 2020; 7:00 pm, FS1		at Washington	W 66–64	8–6 (1–0)	21 – Kyman	12 – Smith	7 – Campbell	Alaska Airlines Arena (9,027); Seattle, WA
January 5, 2020; 4:00 pm, P12N		at Washington State	L 71–79 ^{OT}	8–7 (1–1)	22 – Smith	7 – Tied	2 – Tied	Beasley Coliseum (2,825); Pullman, WA
January 11, 2020; 7:00 pm, ESPN2		USC; Rivalry	L 63–74	8–8 (1–2)	16 – Smith	10 – Smith	4 – Campbell	Pauley Pavilion (13,659); Los Angeles, CA
January 15, 2020; 7:00 pm, P12N		Stanford	L 59–74	8–9 (1–3)	15 – Jaquez Jr.	12 – Hill	5 – Campbell	Pauley Pavilion (5,148); Los Angeles, CA
January 19, 2020; 5:00 pm, ESPNU		California	W 50–40	9–9 (2–3)	17 – Smith	8 – Smith	7 – Campbell	Pauley Pavilion (5,970); Los Angeles, CA
January 23, 2020; 8:00 pm, FS1		at Oregon State	W 62–58	10–9 (3–3)	15 – Smith	5 – Hill	4 – Campbell	Gill Coliseum (4,073); Corvallis, OR
January 26, 2020; 2:00 pm, FOX		at No. 12 Oregon	L 75–96	10–10 (3–4)	20 – Kyman	8 – Hill	5 – Jaquez Jr.	Matthew Knight Arena (9,309); Eugene, OR
January 30, 2020; 8:00 pm, ESPN2		No. 20 Colorado	W 72–68	11–10 (4–4)	30 – Smith	9 – Smith	2 – Tied	Pauley Pavilion (5,566); Los Angeles, CA
February 2, 2020; 12:00 pm, FS1		Utah	W 73–57	12–10 (5–4)	22 – Campbell	8 – Hill	8 – Campbell	Pauley Pavilion (4,497); Los Angeles, CA
February 6, 2020; 8:00 pm, ESPN2		at Arizona State	L 66–84	12–11 (5–5)	16 – Riley	8 – Smith	5 – Campbell	Desert Financial Arena (7,708); Tempe, AZ
February 8, 2020; 7:00 pm, ESPN2		at No. 23 Arizona; Rivalry	W 65–52	13–11 (6–5)	15 – Smith	9 – Hill	5 – Campbell	McKale Center (14,644); Tucson, AZ
February 13, 2020; 8:00 pm, P12N		Washington State	W 86–83 ^{OT}	14–11 (7–5)	23 – Smith	13 – Smith	4 – Jaquez Jr.	Pauley Pavilion (5,125); Los Angeles, CA
February 15, 2020; 7:00 pm, ESPN2		Washington	W 67–57	15–11 (8–5)	20 – Smith	7 – Campbell	6 – Campbell	Pauley Pavilion (8,014); Los Angeles, CA
February 20, 2020; 7:30 pm, FS1		at Utah	W 69–58	16–11 (9–5)	16 – Bernard	8 – Hill	4 – Campbell	Jon M. Huntsman Center (9,815); Salt Lake City, UT
February 22, 2020; 1:00 pm, CBS		at No. 18 Colorado	W 70–63	17–11 (10–5)	16 – Riley	10 – Jaquez Jr.	11 – Campbell	CU Events Center (11,214); Boulder, CO
February 27, 2020; 8:00 pm, P12N		Arizona State	W 75–72	18–11 (11–5)	21 – Kyman	8 – Hill	14 – Campbell	Pauley Pavilion (9,626); Los Angeles, CA
February 29, 2020; 7:00 pm, ESPN		Arizona; Rivalry	W 69–64	19–11 (12–5)	17 – Smith	7 – Jaquez Jr.	8 – Campbell	Pauley Pavilion (11,567); Los Angeles, CA
March 7, 2020; 12:15 pm, CBS		at USC; Rivalry	L 52–54	19–12 (12–6)	13 – Riley	6 – Hill	5 – Campbell	Galen Center (7,622); Los Angeles, CA
Pac-12 Tournament
March 12, 2020; 6:00 pm, P12N	(2)	vs. (10) California; Quarterfinals	Canceled due to the COVID-19 pandemic					T-Mobile Arena; Paradise, NV
*Non-conference game. ^{#}Rankings from AP Poll. (#) Tournament seedings in parentheses. All times are in Pacific Time.

== Honors ==
- February 3, 2020 – Jaime Jaquez Jr. was selected as Pac-12 Freshman of the Week.
- February 24, 2020 - Tyger Campbell was selected as Pac-12 Freshman of the Week.
- March 9, 2020 – Head coach Mick Cronin was named the Pac-12 Coach of the Year; Chris Smith, Jr was named Pac-12 Most Improved Player of the Year and first-team All-Pac-12.
