= 2018–19 UCLA Bruins men's basketball team =

American college basketball season

2018–19 UCLA Bruins men's basketball
- Conference: Pac-12 Conference
- Record: 17–16 (9–9 Pac-12)
- Head coach: Steve Alford (6th season, fired); Murry Bartow (interim)
- Assistant coaches: Duane Broussard; Tyus Edney; Murry Bartow (until 12/31/18); Kory Barnett (starting 12/31/18)
- Home arena: Pauley Pavilion (Capacity: 13,819)

2018–19 Pac-12 Conference men's basketball standings
	Conf.				Overall
Team	W		L	PCT	W		L	PCT
Washington	15	–	3	.833	27	–	9	.750
Arizona State	12	–	6	.667	23	–	11	.676
Utah	11	–	7	.611	17	–	14	.548
Oregon State	10	–	8	.556	18	–	13	.581
Colorado	10	–	8	.556	23	–	13	.639
Oregon †	10	–	8	.556	25	–	13	.658
UCLA	9	–	9	.500	17	–	16	.515
USC	8	–	10	.444	16	–	17	.485
Arizona	8	–	10	.444	17	–	15	.531
Stanford	8	–	10	.444	15	–	16	.484
Washington State	4	–	14	.222	11	–	21	.344
California	3	–	15	.167	8	–	23	.258
† Pac-12 Conference tournament winner

The 2018–19 UCLA Bruins men's basketball team represented the University of California, Los Angeles during the 2018–19 NCAA Division I men's basketball season. The Bruins played their home games at Pauley Pavilion as members in the Pac-12 Conference. They were led by sixth-year head coach Steve Alford until he was fired mid-season and assistant Murry Bartow was named the interim head coach. Their lineup featured three former McDonald's All-Americans: sophomores Jaylen Hands and Kris Wilkes were both named second-team All-Pac-12, while first-year player Moses Brown was voted to the Pac-12 All-Freshman Team. UCLA finished the season 17–16, and lost in the second round of the Pac-12 tournament. They missed the postseason for the second time in four years.

Ranked No. 21 in the preseason AP Poll, the Bruins began the season 4–0 and climbed to No. 17. However, they lost six of the next nine and finished with a 7–6 record in nonconference play, closing it out with four straight losses, the last of which was a 73–58 defeat to Liberty. They committed a season-high 24 turnovers in the game, and the 15-point setback was the most lopsided home loss in Alford's tenure with UCLA. Combined with an earlier home loss to mid-major program Belmont, it was the first time the Bruins had lost consecutive home games to non-Power Five schools since 2012–13. Four days after Belmont, they lost by 29 at Cincinnati, their largest margin of defeat since 2014–15. UCLA had not lost four straight since the end of 2015–16, when they finished the season under .500. They had not suffered four consecutive nonconference losses since 2010–11. On December 31, 2018, two days after the Bruins' loss to Liberty, UCLA fired Alford and named Bartow the interim head coach.

The Bruins were inconsistent under Bartow, logging as many three-game winning streaks as three-game losing streaks. They opened conference play 2–0 at home against San Francisco Bay Area schools Stanford and California. Emphasizing the team's speed and athleticism, he had the Bruins play more aggressive, trapping and applying pressure on defense and attacking on offense by running on both missed and made baskets. Six Bruins scored in double figures against Cal after five reached the threshold against the Cardinal. In their 13 non-conference games under Alford, UCLA never had more than four double-figure scorers. The Bruins won the following game in overtime 87–84 at Oregon after rallying from 17 points down with less than seven minutes left in the second half, and later trailing by nine with 51 seconds remaining. It was the largest comeback in the final minute of a Pac-12 game and tied the sixth-largest deficit overcome in the last minute in Division I history. UCLA's 3–0 start in the conference was their best since starting 5–0 in the Pac-12 in 2012–13, the last time they claimed a conference regular-season title. However, they lost their next three games, falling to 3–7 in their last 10, and 10–9 overall. After wins over Arizona and Washington State, during which they set season-highs in field goal percentage of 57.9 and 58.8 percent, respectively, they lost to Washington after committing 23 turnovers. The Bruins were 5–4 halfway through the conference schedule. While Bartow was pushing for a faster pace, an unintended consequence was UCLA's conference-leading 17.3 turnovers per game, almost four more than they committed during non-conference play.

Entering the second half, UCLA had a favorable schedule with seven of their last nine regular-season games against schools that were ranked in the bottom half of the Pac-12. However, they lost their third straight game on February 9 after blowing a 22-point lead with 12:10 remaining in a 93–92 loss to Utah, which won on a buzzer-beating three-point field goal. The Bruins allowed 61 points in the second half, the most they had surrendered in a half since allowing 64 points in a win against Cal State Northridge in 1998. The Bruins dropped into a four-way tie for seventh place in the Pac-12. Combined with a loss earlier in the week to Colorado, it was the first time that UCLA had been swept in a home series since 2015–16. However, UCLA won four of their next five. The four wins consisted of two overtime games, a one-point victory, and a 19-point comeback. They entered the final week of the regular season with a chance to finish as high as third place in the conference, but lost their final two games to fall to seventh.

In their opening game of the Pac-12 tournament, UCLA switched to a man-to-man defense after having played predominantly zone under Bartow, and they defeated Stanford 79–72. Bruins freshman guard David Singleton broke his foot in the final minute, ending his season. The Bruins lost their next game 83–72 to second-seeded Arizona State in the quarterfinals. They were down by two points with 3:59 remaining before halftime. However, they were outscored 14–0 to end the half, and trailed by double-digits throughout most of the rest of the game. Afterwards, Bartow stated that he was not interested in having his interim tag removed, and expressed optimism that UCLA would "hire a very good coach".

== Previous season ==
The Bruins finished the 2017–18 season 21–12, 11–7 in Pac-12 play to finish in a three-way tie for third place. They defeated Stanford in the quarterfinals of the Pac-12 tournament to advance to the semifinals where they lost to Arizona. They received an at-large bid to the NCAA tournament where they lost in the First Four to St. Bonaventure.

== Off-season ==
=== Departures ===
Name	Pos.	Height	Weight	Year	Hometown	Reason for departure
Thomas Welsh	C	7'0"	255	Sr.	Redondo Beach, California	Graduated; 2018 NBA draft
György Golomon	PF	6'11"	225	Sr.	Körmend, Hungary	Graduated
Ikenna Okwarabizie	C	6'9"	255	Sr.	Lagos, Nigeria	Graduated
Alec Wulff	G	6'3"	185	Sr.	Laguna Beach, California	Walk-on; Graduated
Aaron Holiday	PG	6'1"	185	Jr.	Chatsworth, California	Declared for 2018 NBA draft

=== 2018 recruiting class ===
College recruiting information
Name	Hometown	School	Height	Weight	Commit date
David Singleton; SG	Torrance, CA	Bishop Montgomery High School	6 ft 4 in (1.93 m)	180 lb (82 kg)	Apr 20, 2017
David Singleton; SG	Recruit ratings: Scout: Rivals: 247Sports: ESPN: (84)				
Jules Bernard; SF	Los Angeles, CA	Windward School	6 ft 6 in (1.98 m)	190 lb (86 kg)	Oct 10, 2017
Jules Bernard; SF	Recruit ratings: Scout: Rivals: 247Sports: ESPN: (87)				
Kenneth Nwuba; C	Jackson, MS	Huntington Prep	6 ft 10 in (2.08 m)	240 lb (110 kg)	Nov 7, 2017
Kenneth Nwuba; C	Recruit ratings: Scout: Rivals: 247Sports: ESPN: (77)				
Moses Brown; C	Briarwood, NY	Archbishop Molloy High School	7 ft 0 in (2.13 m)	210 lb (95 kg)	Jan 22, 2018
Moses Brown; C	Recruit ratings: Scout: Rivals: 247Sports: ESPN: (91)				
Tyger Campbell; PG	Des Moines, IA	La Lumiere School	6 ft 0 in (1.83 m)	165 lb (75 kg)	Feb 6, 2018
Tyger Campbell; PG	Recruit ratings: Scout: Rivals: 247Sports: ESPN: (81)				
Shareef O'Neal; PF	Los Angeles, CA	Crossroads School	6 ft 9 in (2.06 m)	205 lb (93 kg)	Feb 27, 2018
Shareef O'Neal; PF	Recruit ratings: Scout: Rivals: 247Sports: ESPN: (89)				
Overall recruit ranking:
Note: In many cases, Scout, Rivals, 247Sports, On3, and ESPN may conflict in their listings of height and weight.; In these cases, the average was taken. ESPN grades are on a 100-point scale.; Sources: "2018 UCLA Commits". Rivals.; "2018 Team Ranking". Rivals.

== Roster ==
2018–19 UCLA Bruins men's basketball team
Players
Coaches

Pos.	#	Name	Height	Weight	Year	Previous school	Hometown
F	0	Alex Olesinski	6 ft 10 in (2.08 m)	220 lb (100 kg)	RS Jr	La Lumiere School	Roswell, New Mexico
C	1	Moses Brown	7 ft 1 in (2.16 m)	245 lb (111 kg)	Fr	Archbishop Molloy HS	Queens, New York
F	2	Cody Riley	6 ft 9 in (2.06 m)	240 lb (109 kg)	RS Fr	Sierra Canyon School	Kansas City, Kansas
G	3	Jules Bernard	6 ft 6 in (1.98 m)	205 lb (93 kg)	Fr	Windward School	Los Angeles, California
G	4	Jaylen Hands	6 ft 3 in (1.91 m)	180 lb (82 kg)	So	Foothills Christian HS	San Diego, California
G	5	Chris Smith	6 ft 9 in (2.06 m)	210 lb (95 kg)	So	Huntington Prep	Chicago, Illinois
G	10	Tyger Campbell (redshirt)	5 ft 11 in (1.8 m)	185 lb (84 kg)	Fr	La Lumiere School	Cedar Rapids, Iowa
G	13	Kris Wilkes	6 ft 8 in (2.03 m)	215 lb (98 kg)	So	North Central HS	Indianapolis, Indiana
F	14	Kenneth Nwuba	6 ft 9 in (2.06 m)	245 lb (111 kg)	Fr	Huntington Prep	Lagos, Nigeria
G	15	Armani Dodson (W)	6 ft 5 in (1.96 m)	210 lb (95 kg)	Jr	Henry J. Kaiser HS	Fontana, California
G	20	Isaac Wulff (W)	6 ft 3 in (1.91 m)	180 lb (82 kg)	Jr	Laguna Beach HS	Laguna Beach, California
F	22	Shareef O'Neal (redshirt)	6 ft 9 in (2.06 m)	215 lb (98 kg)	Fr	Crossroads School	Los Angeles, California
G	23	Prince Ali	6 ft 4 in (1.93 m)	195 lb (88 kg)	RS Jr	Sagemont School	Bronx, New York
F/C	24	Jalen Hill	6 ft 10 in (2.08 m)	235 lb (107 kg)	RS Fr	Centennial HS	Corona, California
G	30	Joseph Wallace (W)	6 ft 2 in (1.88 m)	185 lb (84 kg)	So	Sierra Canyon School	Woodland Hills, California
G	34	David Singleton	6 ft 4 in (1.93 m)	200 lb (91 kg)	Fr	Bishop Montgomery HS	Los Angeles, California
G	43	Russell Stong (W)	6 ft 2 in (1.88 m)	180 lb (82 kg)	Fr	Crespi Carmelite HS	Northridge, California

Head coach

- Steve Alford (fired, Indiana)
- Murry Bartow (interim, UAB)

Assistant coach(es)

- Duane Broussard (Bradley)
- Tyus Edney (UCLA)

Legend

- (C) Team captain
- (S) Suspended
- (I) Ineligible
- (W) Walk-on
- Injured
- Current redshirt

Roster

== Schedule and results ==
Date time, TV	Rank^{#}	Opponent^{#}	Result	Record	High points	High rebounds	High assists	Site (attendance) city, state
Exhibition
October 27, 2018*; 7:30 pm, P12N	No. 21	NYIT	W 125–73		25 – Ali	13 – Brown	7 – Hands	Pauley Pavilion (6,034); Los Angeles, CA
Non–conference regular season
November 6, 2018*; 6:00 pm, P12N	No. 21	Purdue Fort Wayne	W 96–71	1–0	27 – Wilkes	17 – Brown	7 – Hands	Pauley Pavilion (5,931); Los Angeles, CA
November 9, 2018*; 8:00 pm, P12N	No. 21	Long Beach State	W 91–80	2–0	17 – Tied	10 – Brown	3 – Tied	Pauley Pavilion (7,920); Los Angeles, CA
November 16, 2018*; 8:00 pm, P12N	No. 20	Saint Francis (PA); Las Vegas Invitational campus-site game	W 95–58	3–0	23 – Brown	14 – Brown	4 – Hands	Pauley Pavilion (6,127); Los Angeles, CA
November 19, 2018*; 8:00 pm, P12N	No. 17	Presbyterian; Las Vegas Invitational campus-site game	W 80–65	4–0	19 – Hands	20 – Hill	3 – Tied	Pauley Pavilion (6,076); Los Angeles, CA
November 22, 2018*; 7:00 pm, FS1	No. 17	vs. No. 11 Michigan State; Las Vegas Invitational semifinals	L 67–87	4–1	15 – Wilkes	10 – Brown	3 – Hands	Orleans Arena (7,489); Paradise, NV
November 23, 2018*; 1:00 pm, FOX	No. 17	vs. No. 7 North Carolina; Las Vegas Invitational third place game	L 78–94	4–2	22 – Wilkes	9 – Riley	9 – Hands	Orleans Arena (6,500); Paradise, NV
November 28, 2018*; 6:00 pm, P12N		Hawaii	W 80–61	5–2	23 – Ali	7 – Tied	11 – Hands	Pauley Pavilion (6,062); Los Angeles, CA
December 2, 2018*; 7:00 pm, P12N		Loyola Marymount	W 82–58	6–2	17 – Tied	10 – Tied	10 – Hands	Pauley Pavilion (8,242); Los Angeles, CA
December 8, 2018*; 7:30 pm, ESPN2		Notre Dame; Rivalry	W 65–62	7–2	14 – Wilkes	11 – Hill	11 – Hands	Pauley Pavilion (12,985); Los Angeles, CA
December 15, 2018*; 2:00 pm, P12N		Belmont	L 72–74	7–3	20 – Wilkes	9 – Brown	7 – Hands	Pauley Pavilion (8,037); Los Angeles, CA
December 19, 2018*; 6:00 pm, ESPN2		at Cincinnati	L 64–93	7–4	21 – Wilkes	10 – Riley	12 – Hands	Fifth Third Arena (12,689); Cincinnati, OH
December 22, 2018*; 12:00 pm, CBS		vs. No. 15 Ohio State; CBS Sports Classic	L 66–80	7–5	18 – Wilkes	7 – Wilkes	9 – Hands	United Center (15,124); Chicago, IL
December 29, 2018*; 3:00 pm, P12N		Liberty	L 58–73	7–6	14 – Wilkes	9 – Brown	3 – Hill	Pauley Pavilion (7,456); Los Angeles, CA
Pac-12 regular season
January 3, 2019; 8:00 pm, ESPN		Stanford	W 92–70	8–6 (1–0)	17 – Brown	10 – Brown	6 – Hands	Pauley Pavilion (8,026); Los Angeles, CA
January 5, 2019; 1:00 pm, P12N		California	W 98–83	9–6 (2–0)	18 – Wilkes	9 – Brown	6 – Hands	Pauley Pavilion (9,045); Los Angeles, CA
January 10, 2019; 6:00 pm, ESPN		at Oregon	W 87–84 ^{OT}	10–6 (3–0)	22 – Ali	11 – Brown	7 – Hands	Matthew Knight Arena (10,105); Eugene, OR
January 13, 2019; 7:00 pm, FS1		at Oregon State	L 66–79	10–7 (3–1)	21 – Wilkes	9 – Brown	4 – Wilkes	Gill Coliseum (5,853); Corvallis, OR
January 19, 2019; 1:00 pm, CBS		at USC; Rivalry	L 67–80	10–8 (3–2)	15 – Ali	9 – Wilkes	4 – Wilkes	Galen Center (5,226); Los Angeles, CA
January 24, 2019; 8:00 pm, FS1		Arizona State	L 73–84	10–9 (3–3)	15 – Wilkes	10 – Riley	4 – Hands	Pauley Pavilion (7,555); Los Angeles, CA
January 26, 2019; 7:00 pm, ESPN2		Arizona; Rivalry	W 90–69	11–9 (4–3)	34 – Wilkes	15 – Brown	11 – Hands	Pauley Pavilion (11,164); Los Angeles, CA
January 30, 2019; 7:00 pm, P12N		at Washington State	W 87–67	12–9 (5–3)	16 – Brown	7 – Brown	8 – Hands	Beasley Coliseum (2,497); Pullman, WA
February 2, 2019; 1:00 pm, ESPN2		at Washington	L 55–69	12–10 (5–4)	20 – Wilkes	7 – Brown	4 – 2 tied	Alaska Airlines Arena (10,000); Seattle, WA
February 6, 2019; 6:00 pm, P12N		Colorado	L 73–84	12–11 (5–5)	17 – Brown	8 – Brown	6 – Hands	Pauley Pavilion (6,983); Los Angeles, CA
February 9, 2019; 2:00 pm, FOX		Utah	L 92–93	12–12 (5–6)	27 – Hands	5 – Hands	7 – Hands	Pauley Pavilion (7,268); Los Angeles, CA
February 13, 2019; 7:00 pm, P12N		at California	W 75–67 ^{OT}	13–12 (6–6)	27 – Wilkes	11 – Brown	4 – Brown	Haas Pavilion (7,182); Berkeley, CA
February 16, 2019; 7:00 pm, ESPN2		at Stanford	L 80–104	13–13 (6–7)	29 – Hands	7 – Brown	4 – Hands	Maples Pavilion (5,418); Stanford, CA
February 21, 2019; 8:00 pm, FS1		Oregon State	W 68–67	14–13 (7–7)	14 – Brown	11 – Brown	8 – Hands	Pauley Pavilion (6,944); Los Angeles, CA
February 23, 2019; 7:00 pm, ESPN2		Oregon	W 90–83	15–13 (8–7)	27 – Hands	7 – Brown	9 – Hands	Pauley Pavilion (10,588); Los Angeles, CA
February 28, 2019; 6:00 pm, ESPN		USC; Rivalry	W 93–88 ^{OT}	16–13 (9–7)	21 – Hands	14 – Brown	10 – Hands	Pauley Pavilion (12,427); Los Angeles, CA
March 7, 2019; 6:00 pm, ESPN2		at Colorado	L 68–93	16–14 (9–8)	19 – Wilkes	8 – Riley	2 – Smith	CU Events Center (7,797); Boulder, CO
March 9, 2019; 4:00 pm, P12N		at Utah	L 81–92	16–15 (9–9)	20 – Wilkes	13 – Hill	4 – Hands	Jon M. Huntsman Center (12,914); Salt Lake City, UT
Pac-12 Tournament
March 13, 2019; 6:00 pm, P12N	(7)	vs. (10) Stanford; First round	W 79–72	17–15	22 – Hands	11 – Hands	3 – Tied	T-Mobile Arena (8,876); Paradise, NV
March 14, 2019; 6:00 pm, P12N	(7)	vs. (2) Arizona State; Quarterfinals	L 72–83	17–16	25 – Wilkes	8 – Hill	4 – Hands	T-Mobile Arena (13,012); Paradise, NV
*Non-conference game. ^{#}Rankings from AP Poll. (#) Tournament seedings in parentheses. All times are in Pacific Time.

== Rankings ==
Ranking movements Legend: ██ Increase in ranking ██ Decrease in ranking RV = Received votes
	Week																			
Poll	Pre	1	2	3	4	5	6	7	8	9	10	11	12	13	14	15	16	17	18	Final
AP	21	20	17	RV																Not released
Coaches	20	20^	17	RV																

*AP does not release post-NCAA Tournament rankings
^Coaches did not release a Week 2 poll.

== Honors ==
- Jaylen Hands, Pac-12 Men's Basketball Player of the Week (March 4, 2019)
- All-Pac-12
  - Jaylen Hands, Second team
  - Kris Wilkes, Second team
  - Moses Brown, Honorable-mention Pac-12 All-Defensive Team
  - Moses Brown, Pac-12 All-Freshman

== See also ==
- List of UCLA Bruins in the NBA
