= Chris Smith (basketball, born 1999) =

American basketball player (born 1999)

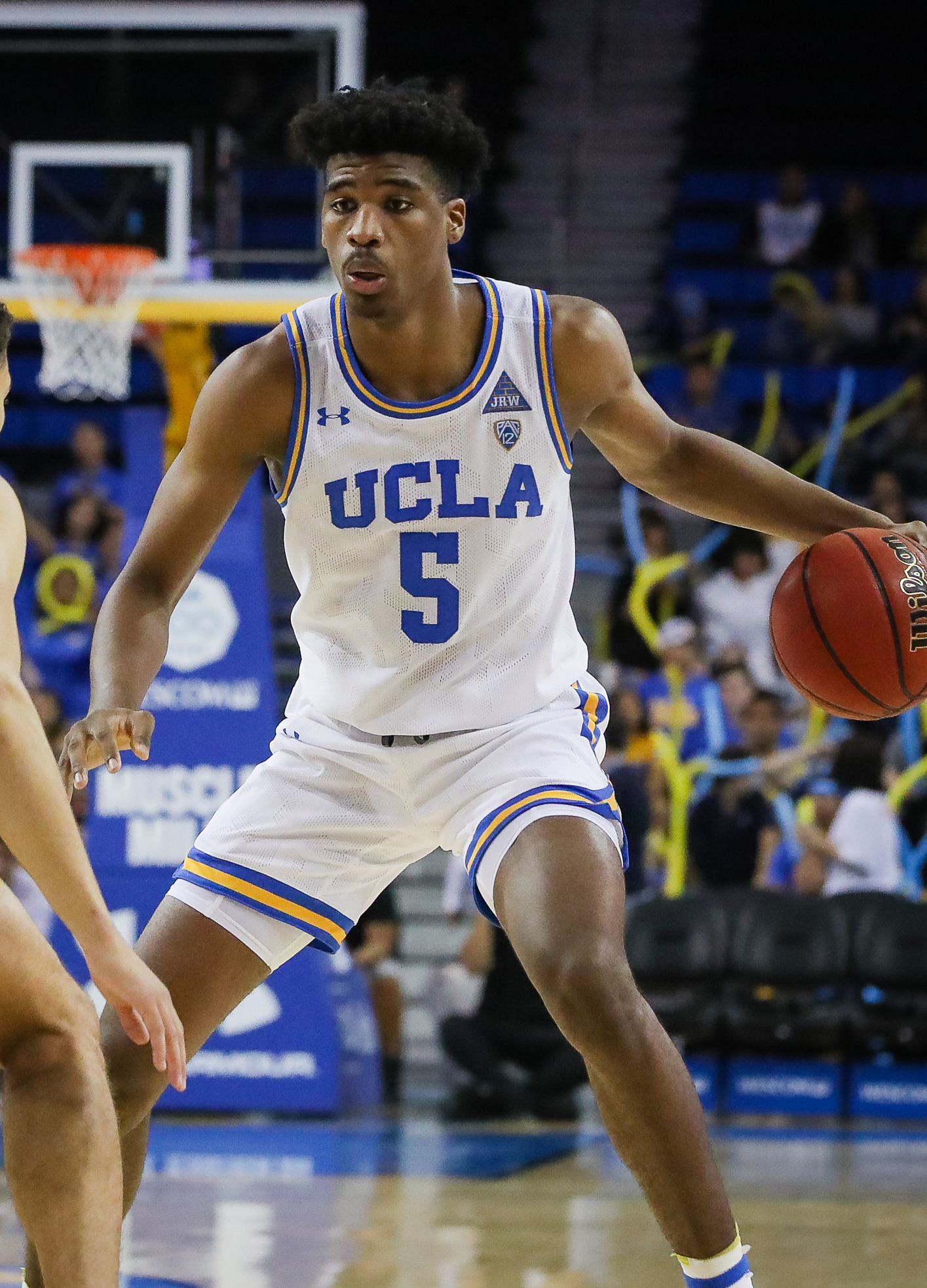
- Smith with the UCLA Bruins in 2019

No. 0 – Taoyuan Pauian Pilots
- Position: Power forward / small forward
- League: P. League+

Personal information
- Born: December 24, 1999 (age 26) Chicago, Illinois, U.S.
- Listed height: 6 ft 9 in (2.06 m)
- Listed weight: 215 lb (98 kg)

Career information
- High school: Fort Worth Country Day (Fort Worth, Texas); Huntington Prep (Huntington, West Virginia)
- College: UCLA (2017–2021)
- NBA draft: 2021: undrafted
- Playing career: 2021–present

Career history
- 2021–2022: Motor City Cruise
- 2023: Salt Lake City Stars
- 2023–2024: Grand Rapids Gold
- 2024: Iowa Wolves
- 2024: Montreal Alliance
- 2024–2025: Ironi Kiryat Ata
- 2025–2026: Iraklis Thessaloniki
- 2026: Karditsa
- 2026–present: Taoyuan Pauian Pilots

Career highlights
- All-CEBL Second Team (2024); CEBL rebounding champion (2024); First-team All-Pac-12 (2020); Pac-12 Most Improved Player (2020)
- Stats at NBA.com
- Stats at Basketball Reference

Sean Christian Smith (born December 24, 1999) is an American professional basketball player for Taoyuan Pauian Pilots of the P. League+ (PLG). He played college basketball for the UCLA Bruins. He earned first-team All-Pac-12 honors as a junior in 2020, when he was also named the conference's most improved player. Undrafted out of college, Smith signed a two-way contract to play with the Detroit Pistons of the National Basketball Association (NBA) and their development team, the Motor City Cruise.

== Early life and high school career ==
Smith's father, Sean, was his coach in middle school. During his first two years at Fort Worth Country Day School, Smith was the quarterback on the football team in addition to playing basketball. He grew 9 inches (23 cm) between his freshman and sophomore years in high school. He transferred to Huntington Prep School. In January 2017, Smith announced he would reclassify from the class of 2018 to the class of 2017. A three-star recruit, Smith signed with UCLA after considering offers from Oregon, TCU, Michigan, Ohio State, North Carolina, and Virginia Tech.

== College career ==
The Los Angeles Times described Smith as "a 6-foot-9, 215-pound string bean" that "played his first slate of nonconference games for the Bruins at 17, sprinkling enticing potential atop a mound of mistakes." He averaged 3.9 points and 1.9 rebounds per game as a freshman but struggled with turnovers. In his sophomore season, Smith scored in double figures in his first five games but only reached double figures scoring in five of the remaining games. He averaged 6.3 points and 3.7 rebounds per game as a part-time starter, making 28.1 percent of his three-point field goals.

During his junior year in 2019–20, Smith averaged 11.1 points per game during nonconference play as the Bruins went 7–6. He improved his performance during the season, posting his first double-double of 17 points and 12 rebounds on January 2, in a win against Washington followed by 22 points in a loss to Washington State. Smith scored a career-high 30 points on January 31, in a 72–68 win against Colorado. Smith led UCLA in scoring with 13.1 points per game as well as averaging 5.4 rebounds, 1.6 assists and 1.0 steals per game. He helped the Bruins finish second in the Pac-12 Conference and was named first-team All-Pac-12 as well as the conference's most improved player. Following the season, Smith declared for the 2020 NBA draft, but he later withdrew, returning to UCLA for his senior season.

Entering the 2020–21 season, Smith was named to the preseason watch lists for the Naismith College Player of the Year, John R. Wooden Award and Julius Erving Award. On December 31, 2020, he suffered a knee injury in the first half against Utah but returned in the second half. However, he was later diagnosed with a torn anterior cruciate ligament (ACL) and ruled out for the season. Smith had been inconsistent on offense, but he was having his best game of the season against the Utes, making all six of his first half shots and finishing the game with 16 points in 22 minutes. He ended the season with averages of 12.6 points and 6.4 rebounds, which were both second on the team at the time. After undergoing knee surgery, Smith spent a month away from the team before returning to rehabilitate with UCLA staff and supporting the team from the sidelines. He was not expected to be able to resume basketball activities until the fall. After the season, Smith declared for the 2021 NBA draft while retaining the option to return to UCLA. An extra year of eligibility was granted to athletes because of the COVID-19 pandemic, but he later confirmed that he was remaining in the draft.

== Professional career ==
After going undrafted, Smith was named to the Detroit Pistons roster for the 2021 NBA Summer League, but he was not expected to play because of his injury. On August 17, 2021, he signed a two-way contract to play with the Pistons and the Motor City Cruise of the G League. On March 8, 2022, Smith injured his left knee against the Canton Charge. He underwent an ACL reconstruction procedure on March 29 and was ruled out for the remainder of the season. On April 3, he was waived by the Pistons without playing an NBA game. In 18 games with Motor City, he averaged 8.7 points, 5.3 rebounds and 1.1 assists.

On January 1, 2023, Smith was acquired via waivers by the Salt Lake City Stars, but was waived on November 9. On November 24, he joined the Grand Rapids Gold, but was waived on December 9 only to rejoin them six days later. On January 2, 2024, he was waived by the Gold, but rejoined them on January 8, lasting five days until being waived. Three days later, Smith joined the Iowa Wolves.

On May 6, 2024, Smith signed with the Montreal Alliance of the Canadian Elite Basketball League.

On October 14, 2024, Smith signed with Ironi Kiryat Ata of the Ligat Winner Sal.

On July 5, 2025, Smith signed a one-year contract with Iraklis of the Greek Basketball League.

On July 27, 2026, Smith signed with Karditsa of the Greek Basketball League (GBL).

== Career statistics ==
Legend
| GP | Games played | GS | Games started | MPG | Minutes per game |
| FG% | Field goal percentage | 3P% | 3-point field goal percentage | FT% | Free throw percentage |
| RPG | Rebounds per game | APG | Assists per game | SPG | Steals per game |
| BPG | Blocks per game | PPG | Points per game | **Bold** | Career high |

=== College ===
| Year | Team | GP | GS | MPG | FG% | 3P% | FT% | RPG | APG | SPG | BPG | PPG |
|---|---|---|---|---|---|---|---|---|---|---|---|---|
| 2017–18 | UCLA | **33** | 0 | 13.1 | .439 | .179 | .585 | 1.9 | .5 | .2 | .2 | 3.9 |
| 2018–19 | UCLA | **33** | 12 | 19.6 | .405 | .281 | .719 | 3.7 | 1.3 | .4 | .3 | 6.3 |
| 2019–20 | UCLA | 31 | **26** | **28.3** | .458 | .341 | **.840** | 5.4 | 1.6 | **1.0** | .4 | **13.1** |
| 2020–21 | UCLA | 8 | 8 | 28.0 | .438 | **.500** | .794 | **6.4** | **2.0** | .9 | **.5** | 12.6 |
| Career | | 105 | 46 | 20.8 | .438 | .316 | .757 | 3.8 | 1.2 | .6 | .3 | 8.0 |
