= 2017–18 NCAA Division I men's basketball corruption scandal =

Collegiate basketball bribery scandal in the United States

- Date: 2017–2018
- Location: United States
- Cause: Bribery, money laundering, wire fraud
- Participants: Adidas; NCAA Colleges: Arizona; Auburn; Kansas; Louisville; Miami; Oklahoma State; South Carolina; Southern California
- Convicted: Jim Gatto, Merl Code, Christian Dawkins (October 2018 trial)
- Charges: Federal wire fraud, bribery

The 2017–18 NCAA Division I men's basketball corruption scandal in the United States initially involved sportswear manufacturer Adidas and several college basketball programs associated with the brand, and eventually also involved many other programs not affiliated with Adidas.

On September 27, 2017, the Federal Bureau of Investigation and the office of the United States Attorney for the Southern District of New York announced the arrest of 10 individuals, including assistant coaches Anthony Bland, Chuck Person, Emanuel Richardson, and Lamont Evans and Adidas executive James Gatto, on various corruption and fraud charges including bribery, money laundering, and wire fraud. The schools implicated in the initial announcement were Arizona, Auburn, Louisville, Miami, Oklahoma State, South Carolina, and Southern California (USC). Richardson had a six-figure salary. However, he was going broke due to him allegedly paying players out of pocket.

The investigation then spread beyond the individuals and teams initially implicated. Shortly afterwards, multiple media reports indicated that the Elite Youth Basketball League, the grassroots basketball division of Nike, was served with a subpoena by federal investigators. While Nike was not named in the initial documents, one of the 10 individuals arrested on September 26 was a former Nike executive who was working for Adidas when he was arrested.

On February 23, 2018, Yahoo! Sports published a report, based on "hundreds of pages of documents" obtained by the FBI from two agents and an agency implicated in the investigation, that named more than a dozen additional schools and over 25 current and former players as having been potentially implicated in the scandal. Still later, on April 10, Southern District prosecutors added extra criminal counts to the indictment of Gatto, with the added counts specifically naming Kansas and North Carolina State as well as Louisville and Miami.

== Background ==
The discovery of corruption in basketball stemmed from an investigation of Pittsburgh-based financial planner Marty Blazer by the U.S. Securities and Exchange Commission (SEC). In 2016, the SEC charged Blazer with wire fraud and accused him of embezzling over $2 million from several professional athletes to invest in movie projects and finance Ponzi schemes. As part of a plea agreement with the Southern District U.S. Attorney's office, he agreed to become an FBI informant, and would later plead guilty to reduced charges.

== Programs affected ==
=== First wave ===
==== Arizona ====
Emanuel "Book" Richardson, an Arizona assistant since 2009, was among the individuals arrested and indicted in 2017. He was alleged to have met with agent Christian Dawkins and others in June 2017, agreeing to accept a $5,000 bribe to steer Arizona players to Dawkins' sports management company, and he was also charged with accepting an additional $15,000 in bribes and paying at least one recruit to commit to the university. Richardson was suspended on September 26, the day after his arrest, and formally fired on January 23, 2018.

Arizona lost one of its three-member 2018 recruiting class in the wake of the initial allegations. Five-star point guard Jahvon Quinerly reopened his recruitment in October and eventually signed with Villanova. Nassir Little, also a five-star recruit, cited the investigation as his reason for deciding against attending Arizona. On a wiretap that was played during the trial, Merl Code claims that Arizona offered $150,000 for Little.

==== Auburn ====
Chuck Person, a former Auburn basketball star who went on to a long National Basketball Association career before going into coaching, was alleged by the FBI to have received over $90,000 in bribes from Rashan Michel, a former NBA and Southeastern Conference referee who ran a custom tailoring shop in Atlanta that had many professional athletes as clients. Person was accused of paying nearly $20,000 to the families of two active Auburn players. Auburn suspended Person without pay shortly after his arrest. Person was indicted by a federal grand jury and subsequently fired by Auburn on November 7, 2017. In the wake of the indictments, the university retained an outside law firm to launch an internal investigation into the program.

Before Auburn's exhibition game on November 2, 2017, the school announced that it would hold players Austin Wiley and Danjel Purifoy out of games indefinitely due to eligibility concerns raised over the FBI investigation. They would both be held out of action throughout the rest of the season, though they returned to play after the conclusion of that season.

On November 8, ESPN reported that head coach Bruce Pearl had refused to cooperate with the school's internal investigation, and that university officials notified him that the refusal could lead to his firing. The university had been unable to determine whether Pearl had been involved in any violations of law or NCAA rules because the FBI had seized his computers and cell phones as part of its investigation.

On the same day that the initial arrests were announced, E. J. Montgomery, a highly touted forward in the 2018 recruiting class who had verbally committed to Auburn in September 2016, announced he would reopen his recruitment. Montgomery ultimately committed to Kentucky in April 2018.

==== Louisville ====
Louisville was not named directly in the court documents, but the documents mentioned a "University-6" that was "a public research university located in Kentucky" with "approximately 22,640 students and over 7,000 faculty and staff members", and fielding "approximately 21 varsity sports teams in NCAA Division I competition." The state has only two public research universities—the University of Kentucky and the University of Louisville—and the details cited in the documents match only Louisville. Gregory Postel, Louisville's interim president, confirmed hours after the FBI announcements that the school was indeed "University-6". At the time of the announcement, the Louisville men's basketball program was facing major NCAA sanctions stemming from an earlier sex scandal, which included vacating the 2013 national championship. The NCAA upheld those sanctions on February 20, 2018.

The documents also alluded to two Louisville coaches, identified only as "Coach-1" and "Coach-2", and a recruit who signed with Louisville identified as "Player-10". The documents allege that the coaches were involved in a scheme by which a "Company-1", later identified as Adidas, would funnel $100,000 to the family of "Player-10" in exchange for him coming to Louisville. About a month before the scandal broke, Louisville, which has been Adidas' flagship college athletic program since 2016, signed a 10-year, $160 million extension to its then-current apparel contract with the company. The documents indicate that Brad Augustine, a youth basketball coach in Florida who was among the individuals arrested, said the following about "Coach-2":

No one swings a bigger dick than Coach-2 at Company-1. . . . All [Coach-2] has to do is pick up the phone and call somebody [and say], 'These are my guys.' [And then] they're taking care of us.

The day after the complaints were unsealed, CBS News, followed by many other media outlets, reported that "Coach-2" was Louisville head coach Rick Pitino. Shortly thereafter, media outlets identified "Player-10" as Brian Bowen, a top recruit who had unexpectedly signed with Louisville on June 3, 2017. Bowen most recently played for the Indiana Pacers on a two-way contract.

As a result of the scandal, on September 27, 2017, Louisville placed Pitino on unpaid administrative leave and athletic director Tom Jurich on paid administrative leave. Bowen was suspended from the team and withheld from all team activities. In addition, two five-star high school recruits who had verbally committed to join the Louisville program in 2018–19, Anfernee Simons and Courtney Ramey, rescinded their commitments and reopened their recruitment. Simons would try his luck with entering the 2018 NBA draft as a high school postgraduate. The Cardinals lost a third recruit on October 4 when David Johnson, a guard from the local Trinity High School who was rated as a top-50 prospect in the recruiting class of 2019 and had verbally committed to Louisville, rescinded his commitment (Johnson would re-commit to Louisville a year later). Two other five-star prospects for 2018 who had placed Louisville within their final choices, Moses Brown and Romeo Langford removed the Cardinals from their lists in the wake of the scandal.

On October 6 the University of Louisville placed associate head coach Kenny Johnson and assistant coach Jordan Fair on paid administrative leave, and Fair would be fired by Louisville on October 11.

The Louisville athletics board officially voted to fire Pitino on October 16. Two days later, the university's board of trustees voted 10–3 to fire Jurich with cause.

On November 8, the Southern District unsealed a new set of indictments against eight of the 10 individuals initially charged. On the same day, NBC News reported that these new documents directly linked Pitino to the alleged scheme to pay Bowen's family. The documents allege that Pitino met in July 2017 with Christian Dawkins, an agent who was formally indicted in both September and November. During that meeting, Dawkins was said to have asked Pitino to call Gatto and request the $100,000 payment to Bowen's family, and Pitino reportedly agreed to make the call to Gatto. The FBI revealed that phone records indicated that Pitino called Gatto three times before Bowen committed to Louisville.

The April 2018 indictments specifically charge Dawkins and Adidas consultant Merl Code with conspiring with Gatto to commit wire fraud and pay the aforementioned $100,000 to Bowen's family.

On May 18, 2018, the board of trustees agreed to a $4.5 million settlement with Jurich that cleared him of any wrongdoing and phrased his termination as "retirement".

==== Miami ====
Like Louisville, the University of Miami was not directly identified in the court documents, but UM president Julio Frenk confirmed on September 27 that the school was the institution described in said documents as "University-7". The confirmation came the day after the attorney for UM head coach Jim Larrañaga said that the coach was unaware of any impropriety in the program. The documents allege that a UM coach identified only as "Coach-3" requested that Gatto arrange a $150,000 payment from Adidas to the family of a top high school player identified as "Player-12" in an attempt to keep him from signing with a "University-4" that was sponsored by a rival apparel company. This alleged $150,000 payment was also included in the April 2018 indictments.

==== Oklahoma State and South Carolina ====
Lamont Evans, at the time an assistant at Oklahoma State, was one of the four coaches arrested on September 26. He was accused of taking at least $22,000 in bribes from two financial advisors, one of whom was acting as an FBI informant. The alleged bribes were offered over a five-year period that included Evans' former tenure as an assistant at South Carolina. Oklahoma State fired Evans on September 28.

Oklahoma State lost one potential recruit due to the scandal. On the same day Evans was fired, Antwann Jones, a guard ranked by ESPN as one of the top 50 players in the recruiting class of 2018, rescinded a verbal commitment he had made to the program less than two weeks earlier.

Evans was sentenced to three months in prison in June 2019 for his participation in the scheme, which he also conducted at the University of South Carolina.

In June 2020, a press release by the NCAA announced that the men’s basketball team will be prohibited from participating in 2020-21 postseason competition and the university will self-impose a fine of $10,000 plus 1 percent of the men’s basketball program’s budget.

==== Alabama ====
In the aftermath of the announcement of the FBI investigation, Alabama director of basketball operations Kobie Baker resigned following an internal investigation into the program. This resignation came after the school uncovered that Baker had accepted bribes to steer one of Alabama's incoming freshman players toward financial advisor Rashan Michel. Baker allegedly accepted a $5,000 payment for arranging a meeting between Michel and the father of the player, and an additional $10,000 for helping to steer the player toward Michel.

Before Alabama's exhibition game on November 6, 2017, the school announced that freshman point guard Collin Sexton would not play that game nor the first regular season game against Memphis due to eligibility concerns. Sexton would later be cleared to play for Alabama starting with their November 14 game against Lipscomb.

==== USC ====
On September 26, federal prosecutors in New York announced charges of fraud and corruption against USC assistant coach Tony Bland. The charges allege that Bland and others allegedly received benefits from financial advisers and others to influence student-athletes to retain their services. Following the announcement, USC placed Bland on administrative leave and announced that it would conduct an internal investigation of the matter. After playing in only a few games in the 2017–18 season, on January 15, 2018, sophomore point guard De'Anthony Melton was indefinitely suspended as a result of the investigation. Melton would later remove himself from the university on February 21, 2018, in order to enter the 2018 NBA draft and begin training for it early, where he was selected 46th by the Houston Rockets and was later traded to the Phoenix Suns on August 31 before the upcoming NBA season began.

On Friday, December 13, 2019, USC received a notice of allegations from the NCAA in regards to the violations stemming from this investigation into the USC basketball department.

In April 2021, the USC men's basketball program was put on probation for two years and fined $5,000, plus one percent of the program's budget.

=== Second wave ===
==== Arizona ====
On February 23, 2018, FBI wiretaps reportedly showed that head coach Sean Miller had discussed with Dawkins about paying Deandre Ayton $100,000 to facilitate Ayton's commitment to the University of Arizona, with the monetary situation being dealt with directly to him. 247Sports, which follows high school players and their recruitment, had predicted 99% that Ayton would be attending University of Kansas the night of his commitment. If he were implicated in this case, it would have potentially hurt Ayton's chances of finishing out the rest of his season with Arizona, as well as result in him entering the 2018 NBA draft earlier than anticipated, similar to that of De'Anthony Melton. The following day, Miller notified the team that he would not coach in that night's game against Oregon, with associate coach Lorenzo Romar coaching the team instead and Ayton being allowed to play for Arizona that game. However, Ayton and his family have maintained they did not earn any monetary benefits to attend Arizona, with further information suggesting that Miller's calls to Dawkins were related to the recruitment of another player instead. This ultimately led to Ayton being cleared to finish out the season with Arizona. On March 1, Miller made his first public comments since the reporting on the wiretaps, in which he unequivocally denied any involvement in payments to players. ESPN reported that Miller would coach the team that night against Stanford, with Miller confirmed to remain the coach for Arizona throughout the rest of this season, as well as a bit further beyond that. (In part because of the continued corruption investigation, Miller would eventually be fired by Arizona in April 2021.)

Arizona, which had already lost one of its three-member 2018 recruiting class after the initial allegations, initially lost its remaining two 2018 recruits after the new revelations. Power forward Shareef O'Neal, son of Hall of Fame player Shaquille O'Neal and rated as a top-30 prospect, announced on February 24 that he was rescinding a commitment he had made in April 2017 to play at Arizona. Because the younger O'Neal signed a nonbinding financial aid agreement instead of a formal letter of intent, he did not need a release from Arizona to choose a new destination, and he would commit to UCLA three days later. Arizona's only remaining recruit at the time in the 2018 class, point guard Brandon Williams, also did not sign a letter of intent, giving him the option to reopen his recruitment, and he chose to do so on March 2. However, unlike Shareef O'Neal, Williams decided to recommit to Arizona on May 5, 2018.

==== NC State ====
According to the documents viewed by Yahoo! Sports, former NC State and current NBA player Dennis Smith Jr. had received $43,500 from ASM Sports, an agency run by reported cooperating government witness Andy Miller, before enrolling at the school. Another document said that Smith had received over $70,000 in loans, with the document also including notes about "how to recoup the money" after Smith chose not to sign with ASM Sports.

The April 2018 indictments specifically charge that Gatto was involved in a scheme to funnel $40,000 to Smith's family in October 2015 in exchange for signing with NC State. Adidas had a well-established relationship with both Smith and NC State, as Smith was playing for an Adidas-sponsored AAU team at the time, and NC State was then (as now) an Adidas-backed program. The indictment also claimed that an NC State coach identified only as "Coach-4" was the conduit for this payment. Smith would sign a financial aid agreement with the school in December of that year.

==== Seton Hall ====
The ASM documents also claim that current NBA player Isaiah Whitehead received at least $26,000 from ASM while at Seton Hall. He signed with ASM after leaving for the 2016 NBA draft, but later moved to Roc Nation.

==== LSU ====
Former LSU player Tim Quarterman allegedly received at least $16,000 from ASM while at the school.

==== Maryland ====
Diamond Stone, who played at Maryland in the 2015–16 season, allegedly received over $14,000 from ASM. The school launched an internal investigation into possible ties with the scandal, with head coach Mark Turgeon denying that he or any of his staff members had any involvement with the agency.

The April 2018 indictments peripherally linked Maryland and its current apparel provider, Under Armour, to the scandal in a completely separate context, although neither was explicitly named in those documents. The FBI alleged that Gatto and a co-conspirator identified in the documents as "CC-3" agreed to make payments to the guardian of a 2017 recruit who was identified by media as Silvio De Sousa. According to the documents, the guardian told "CC-3" that he had received illicit payments from individuals connected with Under Armour in exchange for De Sousa's commitment to Maryland. The guardian also indicated that De Sousa preferred to go to Kansas, but that he would need to repay the illicit payments to facilitate the player's wishes. Gatto and "CC-3" then allegedly paid the guardian $20,000. De Sousa, who had been considered by most recruiting experts as a virtual lock to attend Maryland, committed to Kansas on August 30, 2017. It should also be noted that shortly after the 2018 indictments were unsealed, De Sousa's guardian denied accepting any illicit payments.

==== Kentucky ====
A spreadsheet in the documents viewed by Yahoo! Sports listed a $12,000 payment to a prospect identified as "BAM". A later note in the document identifies this individual as Bam Adebayo, who played only one season at Kentucky in 2016–17. Other documents claim that Adebayo received $36,500 in loans. Additionally, then-current Wildcats player Kevin Knox II was listed among several players who had met or dined with Dawkins, or whose families had done so.

==== Washington ====
Markelle Fultz, who played a season at Washington before leaving to become the top pick in the 2017 NBA draft, allegedly received $10,000 from ASM.

==== USC ====
Melton would ultimately not be the only USC player implicated. The ASM documents claim that two other current USC players, or individuals closely associated with them, had received payments from the company.

==== Utah ====
Kyle Kuzma, a 2017 first-round NBA draft pick, was listed in the ASM documents as having received $9,500 from the agency while at Utah.

==== Xavier ====
Former Xavier star Edmond Sumner and his father reportedly received at least $7,000 in advances from ASM during the younger Sumner's college career.

==== South Carolina ====
After being withheld from play by Louisville amid questions regarding his eligibility stemming from the original revelations, Brian Bowen withdrew from the school and eventually enrolled at South Carolina, though he would not be eligible to play for the Gamecocks' basketball program until January 2019. However, the ASM documents raise more questions about his NCAA eligibility, allegedly listing at least $7,000 in benefits to him and his family during his high school career. That would result in him later rescinding his collegiate entry altogether, instead opting to begin a professional basketball career early, starting with the Sydney Kings in Australia. In addition, PJ Dozier, a star on South Carolina's 2017 Final Four team, was alleged to have received over $6,000 while at the school.

==== Kansas ====
The mother of former Kansas (KU) star Josh Jackson, Apples Jones, reportedly received $2,700 from ASM during Jackson's college career.

The April 2018 indictments raised more serious issues surrounding the Kansas program, which is also sponsored by Adidas. Gatto and the coach of an Adidas-sponsored AAU team were alleged to have given at least $90,000 to the mother of a KU recruit between October 2016 and November 2017 in exchange for the player's commitment to the school. Sources close to the investigation told Yahoo! Sports that this player was Billy Preston, who committed to KU in November 2016 and enrolled at the school in 2017. He played in two exhibition games, but the school did not allow him to play during the beginning 2017–18 season and then left school after questions were raised about his ownership of a car he was driving at the time of an auto accident. Another member of KU's 2017 recruiting class, Silvio De Sousa, was linked to illicit payments in the 2018 indictments. The university attempted a plea deal acknowledging the payment to De Sousa was used to cover an online class. In April 2019, the university submitted their formal appeal to have De Sousa be re-instated for the 2019–2020 season.

==== Texas ====
Then-current Texas player Eric Davis Jr. allegedly received $1,500 from ASM. Texas held him out of the team's February 24 game against Oklahoma State. In addition, former Longhorns player Prince Ibeh was found in Dawkins' list of players and/or families who had met with or dined with Dawkins while in high school or college.

==== San Diego State ====
Then-current San Diego State player Malik Pope allegedly received $1,400 from ASM. Pope was withheld from the team's February 24 game against San Jose State while the school launched an internal investigation into the allegations. San Diego State cleared Pope to play prior to the Aztecs' February 27 game against Boise State, determining that there was no credible evidence that Pope had received any impermissible benefits.

==== Clemson ====
Former Clemson star Jaron Blossomgame reportedly received a payment of $1,100 while at the school.

==== Wichita State ====
The ASM documents allege that former Wichita State star Fred VanVleet received at least $1,000 while playing for the school.

==== Michigan State ====
The mother of then-current Michigan State star Miles Bridges reportedly received several hundred dollars in advances from ASM. An internal Michigan State investigation found that allegations that Bridges' mother had received about $400 in cash from Dawkins were false, but confirmed that Dawkins had paid slightly over $70 for a dinner with Bridges family members (though without the player present). Bridges was temporarily ruled ineligible because of the dinner, but his eligibility was restored on February 24, just in time to play for the Spartans' regular season finale at Wisconsin. Bridges made a $40 contribution (the approximate value of his family members' meals at the Dawkins meeting) to a charity of his choice as part of the reinstatement process.

==== Other players potentially implicated ====
The ASM documents also indicated that several players, or their family members, had either met or dined with Dawkins while the players were in high school or college. According to a lawyer involved with NCAA compliance issues who was interviewed in the Yahoo! Sports report, merely meeting with an agent is not an NCAA violation, but if the agent pays for a player's or family member's meal, the meal can be considered an "extra benefit" under NCAA rules. In addition to the aforementioned Knox and Ibeh, the following then-current and former NCAA players were listed in the ASM documents in this context:

- Current players (at the time of the revelations):
  - Wendell Carter Jr., Duke
  - Collin Sexton, Alabama
- Former players:
  - Wade Baldwin, Vanderbilt
  - Tony Bradley, North Carolina
  - Malcolm Brogdon, Virginia
  - Demetrius Jackson, Notre Dame
  - Monte Morris, Iowa State
  - Justin Patton, Creighton

== Legal outcomes ==
The FBI investigation led to criminal charges against several individuals. In October 2018, following trials in the Southern District of New York, three men were convicted of federal fraud charges: Jim Gatto, a senior Adidas executive; Merl Code, a former Adidas consultant; and Christian Dawkins, a sports agent. The convictions related to bribery and fraud in connection with the recruitment of top college basketball prospects.

In a second trial in April 2019, Dawkins was again convicted, along with former University of South Carolina assistant basketball coach Lamont Evans, who had pleaded guilty and cooperated with prosecutors. Several other coaches, including former University of Arizona assistant Emanuel "Book" Richardson, pleaded guilty to fraud and bribery charges.

== Documentary ==
On March 31, 2020, a documentary based on the scandal, titled The Scheme, was released by HBO. The film received positive reviews from critics.

== See also ==
- Amateurism in the NCAA
- 1951 college basketball point-shaving scandal
- Southern Methodist University football scandal
- 1961 NCAA University Division men's basketball gambling scandal
- 1978-79 Boston College basketball point shaving scandal
- 2015 University of Louisville basketball sex scandal
