= St. Joseph Central Catholic High School =

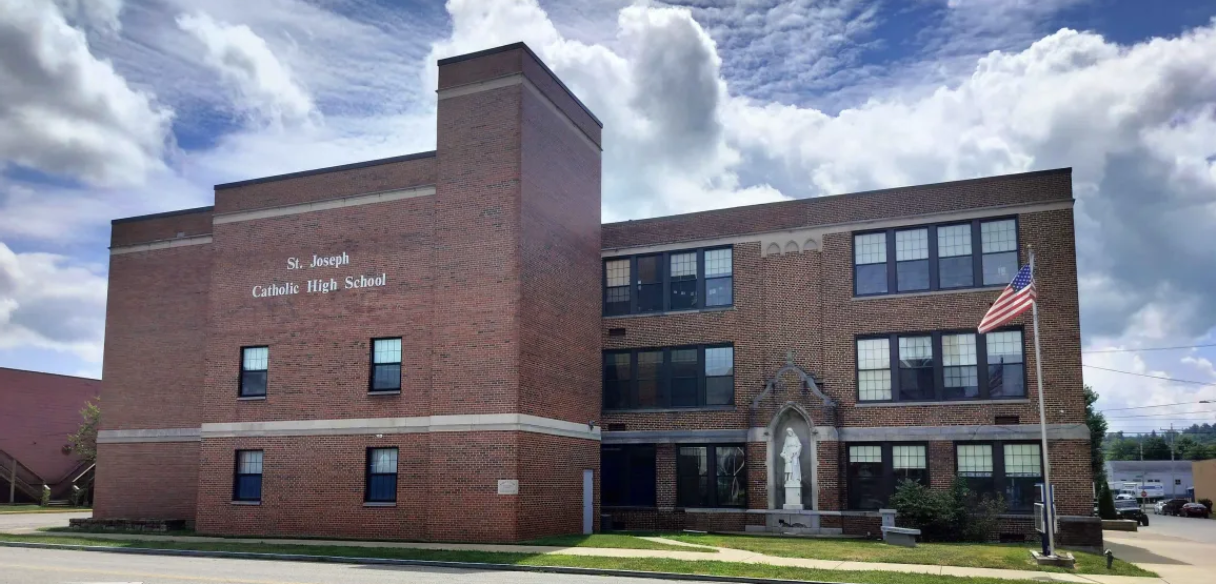
- St. Joseph Central Catholic High School in 2024.

Location
- 600 13th Street; Huntington, (Cabell County), West Virginia 25701-2304; United States; 38°25′9″N 82°26′9″W

Information
- Type: Private, coeducational
- Motto: Honor, Scholarship, Service
- Religious affiliation: Roman Catholic
- Patron saint: St. Joseph
- Established: 1924
- Oversight: Diocese of Wheeling-Charleston
- Principal: Carol Templeton
- Grades: 9-12
- Average class size: 40
- Colors: Blue and gold
- Mascot: Leprechaun
- Team name: Irish
- Accreditation: North Central Association of Colleges and Schools
- Website: https://www.stjosephhs.org

St. Joseph Central Catholic High School is a private Catholic high school in Huntington, West Virginia. It is part of the Diocese of Wheeling-Charleston.

== Athletics ==
=== Huntington Prep School ===
Since 2009, Huntington Prep School was originally housed within St. Joseph Central Catholic High School, but in 2020 ended that relationship. The students were regular St. Joseph's students. They had to abide by the rules and regulations of the high school. After becoming accepted in the school, Huntington Prep became Huntington St. Joseph Prep (even wearing the St. Joe emblem on the uniforms). Since 2021, Huntington Prep became part of Cabell County Schools after they moved host schools to Huntington High School.

=== Championships ===
Listed below are all championships won by St. Joseph Central Catholic High School.

	State championships	State runners-up
Sport	Year(s)	Year(s)
Baseball	1999, 2000	2002
Boys basketball	2016
Boys soccer	1988, 2025, 2026	1989, 1990, 1991, 1992, 1997
Softball	2003
Boys tennis	2005
Girls tennis	2015, 2016

== Clubs and organizations ==
- Mu Alpha Theta
- National Honor Society
- Book Club
- Dead Theologians Society
- Fellowship of Christian Athletes
- Health Science Club
- Key Club
- Latin Club
- Music Ministry
- Outdoor Recreation Club
- Archery club
- Sociedad Honoraria Hispanica (SHH)
- Spirit Club
- Student Council
- Students Against Destructive Decisions: SADD
- Newspaper
- Yearbook club

== Notable alumni ==
- 1972 - Mike Woelfel, West Virginia Senate
- 2010 - Gorgui Dieng, San Antonio Spurs
- 2012 - Sim Bhullar, Tainan TSG GhostHawks of the T1 League
- 2013 - Moses Kingsley, former Nigerian basketball player
- 2013 - Xavier Rathan-Mayes, Merkezefendi Bld. Denizli Basket of the Turkish Basketball Super League
- 2013 - Andrew Wiggins, former first overall pick, Golden State Warriors
- 2014 - Josh Perkins, Petkim Spor of the Turkish Basketball Super League (BSL)
- 2015 - Thomas Bryant, Denver Nuggets
- 2016 - Miles Bridges, Charlotte Hornets
- 2017 - Onuralp Bitim, Chicago Bulls
- 2018 - Keldon Johnson, San Antonio Spurs
- 2020 - Jonathan Kuminga, Golden State Warriors
- 2020 - Joshua Primo, San Antonio Spurs
- 2020 - JT Thor, Charlotte Hornets
