= Sean Miller =

American basketball coach (born 1968)

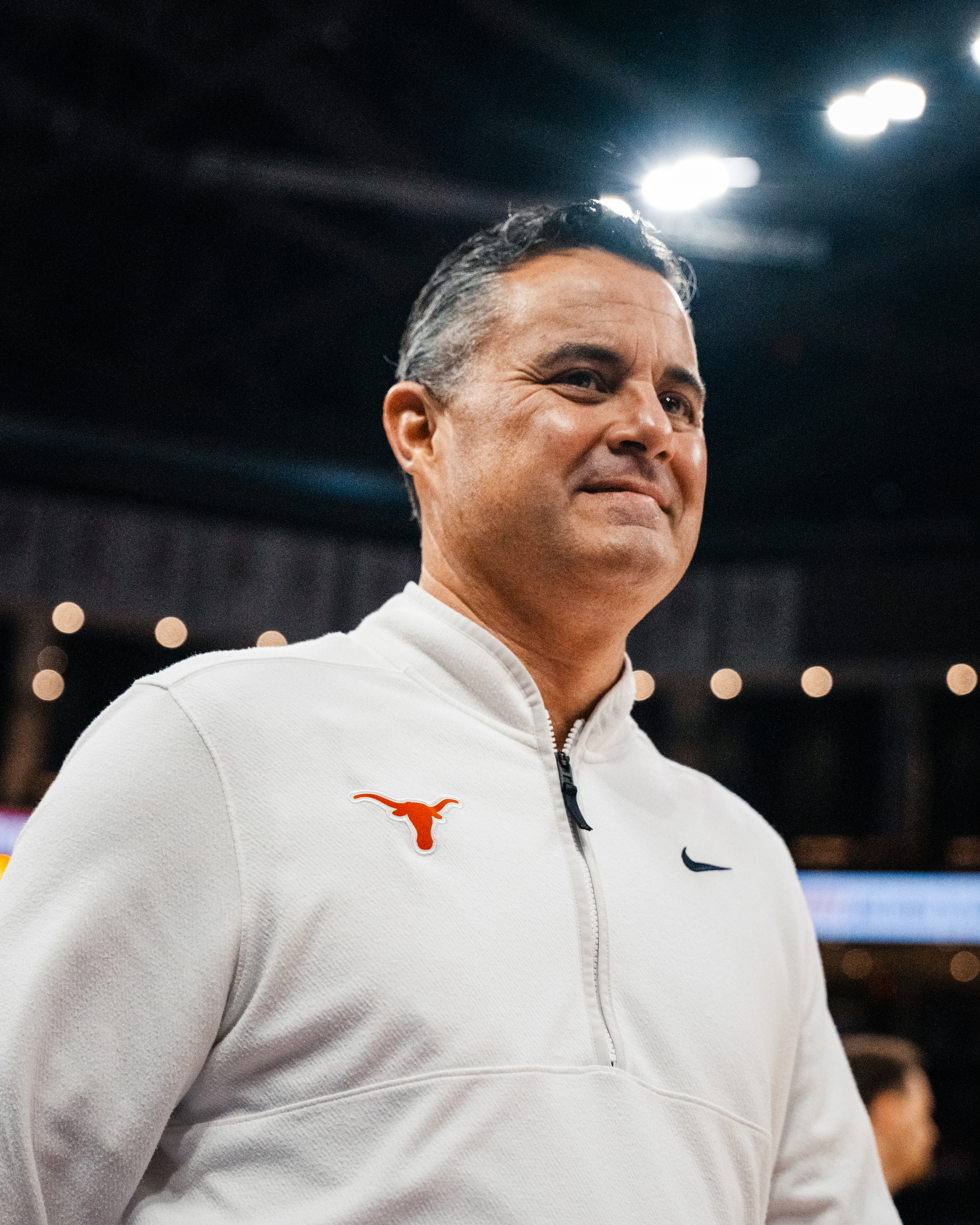
- Miller in 2025

Current position
- Title: Head coach
- Team: Texas
- Conference: SEC
- Record: 4–0 (1.000)

Biographical details
- Born: November 17, 1968 (age 57); Ellwood City, Pennsylvania, U.S.

Playing career
- 1987–1992: Pittsburgh
- Position: Point guard

Coaching career (HC unless noted)
- 1992–1993: Wisconsin (GA)
- 1993–1995: Miami (OH) (assistant)
- 1995–1996: Pittsburgh (assistant)
- 1996–2001: NC State (assistant)
- 2001–2004: Xavier (assistant)
- 2004–2009: Xavier
- 2009–2021: Arizona
- 2022–2025: Xavier
- 2025–present: Texas

Head coaching record
- Overall: 512–211 (.708)
- Tournaments: 25–14 (NCAA Division I); 0–2 (NIT)

Accomplishments and honors

Championships
- 5 Pac-10/12 regular season (2011, 2014, 2015, 2017, 2018); 3 Pac-12 tournament (2015, 2017, 2018); 3 Atlantic 10 regular season (2007–2009); Atlantic 10 tournament (2006)

Awards
- USA Basketball National Co-Coach of the Year (2015); Pac-10/12 Coach of the Year (2011, 2014, 2017); Atlantic 10 Coach of the Year (2008); Third-team All-Big East (1992); Big East Freshman of the Year (1988)
Medal record
Head Coach for United States
FIBA U19 World Championship
Gold medal – first place	2015 Greece	Team
Assistant coach for United States
FIBA Americas U18 Championship
Gold medal – first place	2014 United States	Team
Player for United States
World University Games
Gold medal – first place	1991 England	Team

Sean Edward Miller (born November 17, 1968) is an American college basketball coach who currently serves as head coach at the University of Texas at Austin. He previously served as head coach at the University of Arizona from 2009 to 2021 and Xavier University from 2004 to 2009 and then again from 2022 to 2025.

Miller is a three-time gold medalist as a member of USA Basketball: once as a player, once as an assistant coach, and once as head coach. Miller has won five league Coach of the Year Awards: once in the A10, three in the Pac-12, and once as USA Basketball Coach of the Year.

== Playing career ==
=== Early years ===
Miller was born in Ellwood City, Pennsylvania. The son of John Miller, a Pennsylvania high school basketball coach, Miller was a point guard under his father at Blackhawk High School in Chippewa Township, Beaver County, Pennsylvania. He had developed considerable ballhandling skills before that time and appeared on The Tonight Show Starring Johnny Carson when he was fourteen years old. His ball handling skills were such that he was featured in the 1979 movie The Fish That Saved Pittsburgh, starring basketball star Julius Erving. In his junior year, he led Blackhawk to the 1986 Western Pennsylvania Interscholastic Athletic League (WPIAL) title. In his senior year, he averaged 27 points and 11 assists per game and helped lead his Blackhawk Cougars to the 1987 WPIAL championship game.

After graduation, he chose to play basketball for Pittsburgh in the Big East. He was recruited to Pittsburgh by John Calipari who was an assistant for the Panthers from 1985 to 1988.

=== University of Pittsburgh ===
Miller played at Pitt from 1987 to 1992. Despite being a true freshman, he was the starting point guard. Some of his more famous teammates at the time include Charles Smith and Jerome Lane. Many of his teammates recall his knowledge of the game and his leadership qualities. His knowledge of the game allowed him to compete at this level, although he did not have the speed or athleticism of his peers. Jason Matthews, the shooting guard next to Miller, recalls he was the leader of the team, even as a freshman, and that the upperclassmen welcomed him as a leader. Because of his knowledge and leadership abilities, none of his teammates were surprised once he became a top coach in NCAA men's basketball. Miller's collegiate statistics are: 128 games played, 1,282 points, 10.0 points per game, 744 assists, 5.8 assists per game, 261 rebounds, 2.0 rebounds per game, and 102 steals.

Sean was on the all-Rookie team for the Big East and also won the 1987-88 Big East Freshman of the Year. As of the 2023-24 season, he was the No. 21 all-time scorer and second-best three-point shooter for Pitt in a career (41.6%), held the school record for career free throw % (88.5%), and had the fourth most career assists ever in the Big East. Furthermore, he ranked 10th among career Division I free-throw shooters at .885.

== Coaching career ==
=== Early years ===
After graduating from Pitt with a degree in communications in 1992, Miller took a graduate assistant position at Wisconsin. He then spent two seasons (1993–95) at Miami (Ohio) under Herb Sendek, during which the team made two postseason appearances. He then returned to his alma mater of Pittsburgh for a season as an assistant under Ralph Willard.

In 1996, Miller rejoined Sendek at North Carolina State. In Miller's five years in Raleigh, the Wolfpack made four postseason appearances, including a run into the 2000 NIT semifinals.

Miller's next move was a return to southwestern Ohio in 2001. This time, he would join Thad Matta's staff at Xavier as the first associate head coach in the school's history. The Musketeers won 26 games in each of Miller's three seasons under Matta, making the NCAA tournament each season. The 2004 season was especially notable. First, the Musketeers won the Atlantic 10 postseason tournament despite having to play four games to do so. Xavier then made a deep run in the subsequent NCAA tournament, finishing with the school's first-ever appearance in the Elite Eight.

=== Xavier ===
Taking over as head coach at Xavier after Matta moved on to Ohio State, Miller took the Musketeers to four NCAA tournaments. Miller won three A-10 regular season championships and one A-10 conference tournament championship. In the 2008 NCAA tournament, the 3rd seeded Musketeers were eliminated in the Elite Eight by #1 seed UCLA after beating Georgia, Purdue and West Virginia. In 2009, Xavier was eliminated in the Sweet 16 by another #1 seed, Pittsburgh.

=== Arizona ===
After the tournament, Miller accepted the vacant head coaching position at Arizona, which had spent two years under interim head coaches in the wake of the illness and retirement of Hall of Fame coach Lute Olson. He initially turned the job down before changing his mind and accepting the job on April 6, 2009, despite having never visited the Arizona campus. He was succeeded at Xavier by former assistant Chris Mack. Within three months of joining the program, Miller assembled a recruiting class ranked #12 in the nation by Scout.com. Miller led Arizona to a 16–15 record (10–8 in the Pacific-10 Conference) in his debut season, and the Wildcats missed postseason play for the first time in 25 years.

In the 2010–11 season, Miller guided Arizona back to college basketball relevance. He led Arizona to its first top-10 ranking in the AP poll since January 8, 2007, and led the Wildcats to their first outright Pac-10 regular-season title (its 12th overall), fourth 30+-win season, second Elite Eight appearance, and its highest coaches poll finish (ninth) since the 2004–2005 season. Miller compiled a recruiting class including four ESPNU top 100 recruits (#4 by Scout.com), which was widely regarded as a top ten recruiting class. In addition, Miller led the Wildcats to their first unbeaten home record (17–0) in 14 years and was named Pac-10 Coach of the Year, the first time an Arizona coach received this honor since Lute Olson in 2003. The 17 consecutive home wins tied for second most in school history and was part of a 19-game home streak beginning in the 2009–10 season. Miller's recruiting has improved. From not being ranked in the top-25 recruiting classes by ESPN in 2010, Miller guided the Cats to their first Elite Eight appearance since the 2004–05 season, but where they lost to eventual national champion Connecticut 65–63.

For his third season, Arizona's 2011 recruiting class was ranked seventh, notably signing Nick Johnson and Josiah Turner. Arizona secured three players in the top nine of the ESPNU 100, with all four newly signed players in the top 36. This cemented Arizona as the No. 1 signing class nationally, surpassing Kentucky, which held the top spot in 2010 and 2011. The Wildcats missed the postseason for the second time, reaching to the NIT Tournament before falling to Bucknell to finish the season 23–12 overall, 12–6 in Pac-12.

In his fourth season, Miller guided the Wildcats to their second top-five ranking in the AP poll (the first coming in weeks 7–10 of the 2012–13 season). Arizona reached the Sweet 16 in the 2013 NCAA tournament before falling to Ohio State and finishing the season with an overall record of 27–8 and 12–6 in Pac-12.

On December 9, 2013, in Miller's fifth season leading the Wildcats, Arizona became the top-ranked team in the country for the sixth time in school history following a 9–0 start and wins over Duke and UNLV. Miller led the Wildcats to their second outright Pac-12 regular season title (its 13th overall, 26th regular season overall). Arizona also secured its second unbeaten home record (18–0) and Coach Miller was again named the Pac-10/12 coach of the year. The Wildcats completed their fifth ever 30+-win season. In the NCAA tournament, Arizona made its second Elite Eight appearance (ninth overall) of the Miller era, but fell to Wisconsin in overtime to finish with an overall record of 33–5, including 15–3 in Pac-12.

After Gonzaga's home loss to BYU on February 28, 2015, Arizona claimed the longest active home winning streak in D-I men's college basketball. Arizona defeated #13 Utah in Salt Lake City the same day, winning a share of the Pac-12 regular season title. After losses to Arizona State, Oregon State, and UNLV, Arizona won their third outright Pac-12 regular season championship title under Miller's leadership (its 14th Pac-12 regular-season title and 27th conference title overall). The Wildcats completed their sixth 30+ win season (third under Miller) and won their first Pac-12 Tournament title (5th overall) since 2002. In the 2015 NCAA tournament, the Wildcats fell to Wisconsin for the second consecutive year in the Elite Eight, 85–78, finishing with a 34–4 record overall, 16–2 in Pac-12.

During the 2016–17 season, he signed an extension with Arizona through the 2022 season. On March 6, Miller won his 3rd Pac-12 Coach of the Year honor, second most in school history. Miller's Wildcats finished the Pac-12 regular season 27–4, including 16–2 in conference play, which was good enough to become conference co-champions. Miller and the Wildcats received a two-seed in the West Region, losing to 11-seed Xavier in the Sweet 16 in San Jose, 73–71.

He was the subject of an investigation related to the 2017 NCAA basketball corruption scandal regarding offers to illegally pay athletes for attending his school, including 2017 recruit and future #1 2018 NBA draft pick Deandre Ayton. On February 24, 2018, Miller would not be allowed to coach the upcoming game against Oregon, with coaching instead going to Lorenzo Romar that game. On March 1, Miller denied any allegations against him and was reinstated as Arizona's head coach.

After 12 seasons as head coach, Miller was fired by Arizona on April 7, 2021. On December 14, the IARP ruled in the 2017–18 NCAA Division I men's basketball corruption scandal Arizona and Miller were forced to vacate all regular-season, conference, and NCAA Tournament wins in which Alkins competed during 2016–17 and 2017–18, plus the two exhibition games in Spain in August 2017 that Pinder played in. It reduced Arizona's record from 32–5 to 0–5 in 2016–17 and from 27–8 to 9–8 in 2017–18, when former guard Rawle Alkins played in 18 games. Miller vacated 50 wins in his coaching record wherever he coaches collegiately.

=== Xavier (second stint) ===
Miller was hired by Xavier on March 19, 2022, after having last coached at the school in 2009. In his first season back at Xavier (2022–23) Miller led the Musketeers to a 27-10 record which included a 2nd place finish in the BIG EAST regular season and being the Runner-Up at the BIG EAST Tournament. Xavier advanced to the Sweet 16, the 9th in program history, eventually losing to Texas. After finishing with a losing record after experiencing two season ending injuries in the summer before the 2023-24 season started to Zach Freemantle & Jerome Hunter, Miller led Xavier back to the NCAA Tournament in the 2024-25 season. The 11-seed Musketeers beat Texas in the First Four play-in round before losing to Illinois in the first round of the Midwest Regional.

=== Texas ===
Miller took the job vacancy at Texas on March 23, 2025, after the university fired head coach Rodney Terry. Miller won his 500th game as a head coach on January 31, 2026, in a 79-69 win at Oklahoma. Miller became the first Texas head coach to get the Longhorns to the Sweet Sixteen in his first season. The Longhorns beat NC State in the First Four, BYU in the First Round, and Gonzaga in the Round of 32. Texas would fall to Purdue in the Sweet 16 in San Jose, CA. This was the ninth trip to the Sweet 16 in 21 years as a head coach for Miller.

Sean Miller during the 2026 NCAA Tournament in Portland.

== USA Basketball ==
Miller served as the head coach of the USA men's Under-19 junior national team, which competed at the 2015 FIBA Under-19 World Championship. The USA team ended with a perfect 7–0 record and a gold medal. As a result of this performance, Miller was named the co-national coach of the year by USA Basketball. He was replaced by close friend John Calipari as head coach in 2017, ending his two-year run.

== Personal life ==
Miller and his wife Amy have three sons (Austin, Cameron, and Braden). His brother, Archie Miller, is the men's basketball head coach at Rhode Island.

== Head coaching record ==
Record table
Season	Team	Overall	Conference	Standing	Postseason
Xavier Musketeers (Atlantic 10 Conference) (2004–2009)
2004–05	Xavier	17–12	10–6	T–2nd (West)	
2005–06	Xavier	21–11	8–8	T–7th	NCAA Division I Round of 64
2006–07	Xavier	25–9	13–3	T–1st	NCAA Division I Round of 32
2007–08	Xavier	30–7	14–2	1st	NCAA Division I Elite Eight
2008–09	Xavier	27–8	12–4	1st	NCAA Division I Sweet 16
Arizona Wildcats (Pacific-10/Pac-12 Conference) (2009–2021)
2009–10	Arizona	16–15	10–8	4th	
2010–11	Arizona	30–8	14–4	1st	NCAA Division I Elite Eight
2011–12	Arizona	23–12	12–6	4th	NIT First Round
2012–13	Arizona	27–8	12–6	T–2nd	NCAA Division I Sweet 16
2013–14	Arizona	33–5	15–3	1st	NCAA Division I Elite Eight
2014–15	Arizona	34–4	16–2	1st	NCAA Division I Elite Eight
2015–16	Arizona	25–9	12–6	T–3rd	NCAA Division I Round of 64
2016–17	Arizona	32–5*	16–2*	T–1st*	NCAA Division I Sweet 16*
2017–18	Arizona	27–8*	14–4*	1st*	NCAA Division I Round of 64*
2018–19	Arizona	17–15	8–10	T–8th	
2019–20	Arizona	21–11	10–8	T–5th	NCAA Tournament Cancelled due to COVID
2020–21	Arizona	17–9	11–9	5th	
Arizona:		302–109 (.735)*	150–68 (.688)*		
Xavier Musketeers (Big East Conference) (2022–2025)
2022–23	Xavier	27–10	15–5	2nd	NCAA Division I Sweet 16
2023–24	Xavier	16–18	9–11	T–9th	NIT First Round
2024–25	Xavier	22–12	13–7	T–4th	NCAA Division I Round of 64
Xavier:		185–87 (.680)	94–46 (.671)		
Texas Longhorns (Southeastern Conference) (2025–present)
2025–26	Texas	21–15	9–9	10th	NCAA Division I Sweet 16
2026–27	Texas	4–0	0–0		
Texas:		25–15 (.625)	9–9 (.500)		
Total:		512–211 (.708)*			
National champion Postseason invitational champion Conference regular season champion Conference regular season and conference tournament champion Division regular season champion Division regular season and conference tournament champion Conference tournament champion

* The NCAA vacated 32 wins from the 2016–17 season, and 18 wins from the 2017–18 season as a result of the 2017–18 NCAA men's basketball corruption scandal. The players involved in the scandal played in every game in the 2016–17 & 23 games in the 2017–18 season, resulting in a 9–8 record.
