= Shareef O'Neal =

American basketball player (born 2000)

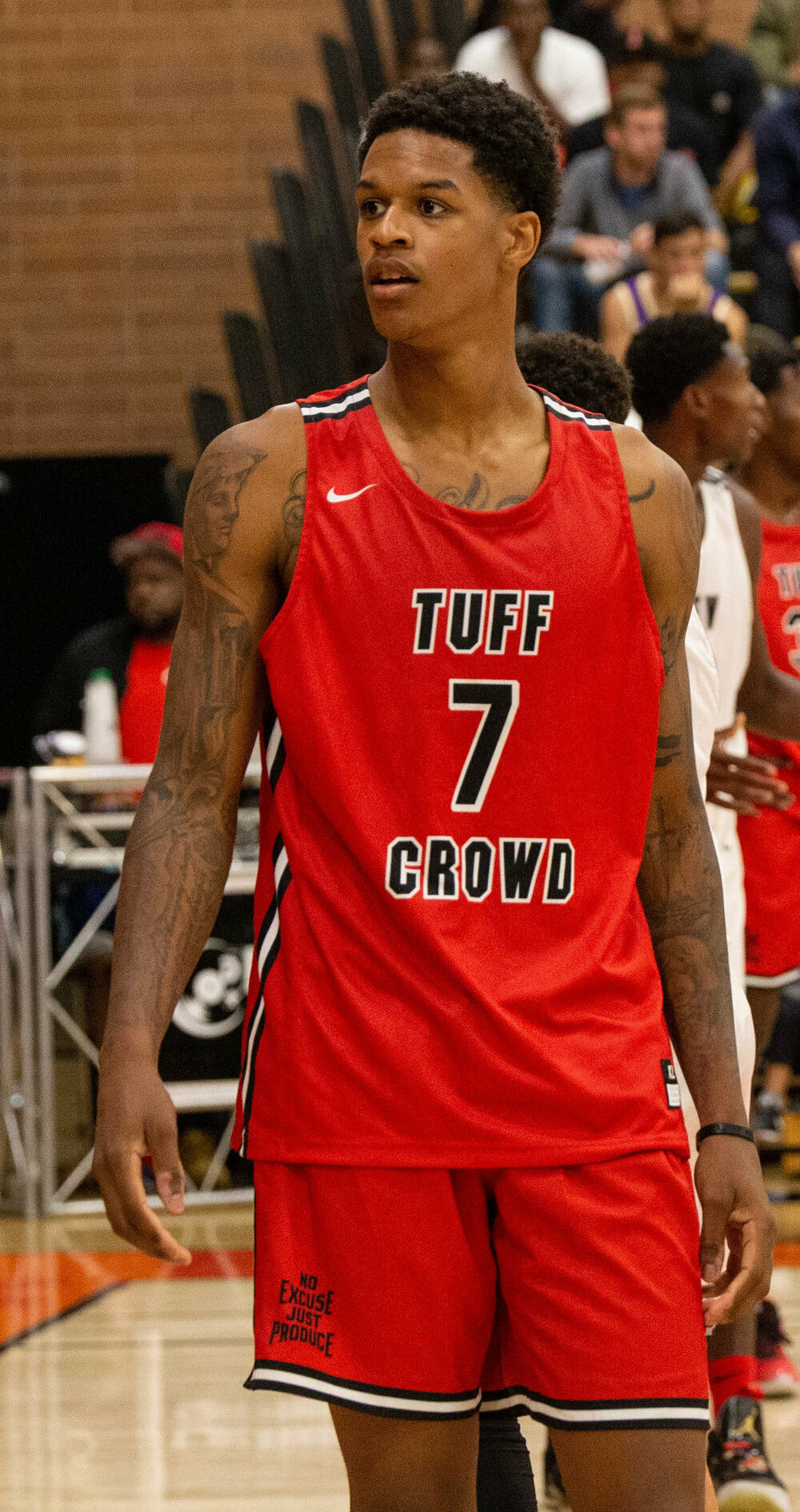
- O'Neal at the Drew League in 2019

Personal information
- Born: January 11, 2000 (age 26) Los Angeles, California, U.S.
- Listed height: 6 ft 10 in (2.08 m)
- Listed weight: 220 lb (100 kg)

Career information
- High school: Windward School (Los Angeles, California); Crossroads School (Santa Monica, California)
- College: UCLA (2018–2020); LSU (2020–2022)
- NBA draft: 2022: undrafted
- Playing career: 2022–2023
- Position: Power forward / center

Career history
- 2022–2023: NBA G League Ignite

Career highlights
- NBA G League Next Up Game (2023)
- Stats at NBA.com
- Stats at Basketball Reference

Shareef Rashaun O'Neal (born January 11, 2000) is an American former professional basketball player. The son of Hall of Fame player Shaquille O'Neal, he attended Crossroads School in Santa Monica, California. As a senior forward, O'Neal was ranked among the top high school basketball players of his class. He was a redshirt during his first season in college basketball with the UCLA Bruins, when he underwent heart surgery. He played as a reserve for the Bruins in 2019–20 before transferring midseason to the LSU Tigers.

Off the courts, he is a recruiter for NIL deals for Reebok, appointed by Shaquille O'Neal, the president of the company.

== Early life ==
Born in Los Angeles, O'Neal is the son of former National Basketball Association (NBA) player Shaquille O'Neal and Shaunie O'Neal. He has two older half-siblings and three younger siblings. Despite his father's basketball fame, Shareef grew up without a passion for the game and preferred skateboarding. His interest in basketball grew after he had a disappointing performance at a middle school Amateur Athletic Union game and was prompted to "prove everybody wrong" on the court. At age 13, O'Neal began training regularly and was able to dunk.

== High school career ==
Starting in his freshman season, O'Neal played basketball for Windward School in Los Angeles at the forward position. His highlight videos immediately helped him gain popularity on the Internet and appeared in The Washington Post. However, he received limited playing time because the team's six seniors earned the most minutes. Head coach Steve Smith viewed O'Neal's first season with Windward as a "learning year" and expected him to assume a larger role in the following season. At the end of the season, he was averaging 3.7 points and 2.9 rebounds per game. In May 2015, O'Neal received a scholarship offer from USC, his first from an NCAA Division I program. In the following months, he had additional offers from Baylor, LSU, UCLA, and Kansas State.

O'Neal remained with Windward as a sophomore and saw significant improvement. In October 2015, at a tournament in Fairfax High School that featured many top high school teams in the nation, O'Neal scored 23 points in a loss to Bishop Alemany. O'Neal, in December, drew attention from scouts at the MaxPreps Holiday Classic despite his team's struggles. He became known as a versatile swingman with ball-handling, shooting, and defending skills.

On June 29, 2016, the Los Angeles Times announced that O'Neal would transfer to Crossroads School in Santa Monica. He joined the team expected to take a leading role with top high school recruit Ira Lee. On January 6, 2017, O'Neal scored 15 points in a 54–50 win over Brentwood. In a 44–80 loss to Mater Dei on February 17, he scored 20 points in a matchup with Bol Bol, son of former NBA player Manute Bol.

=== Recruiting ===
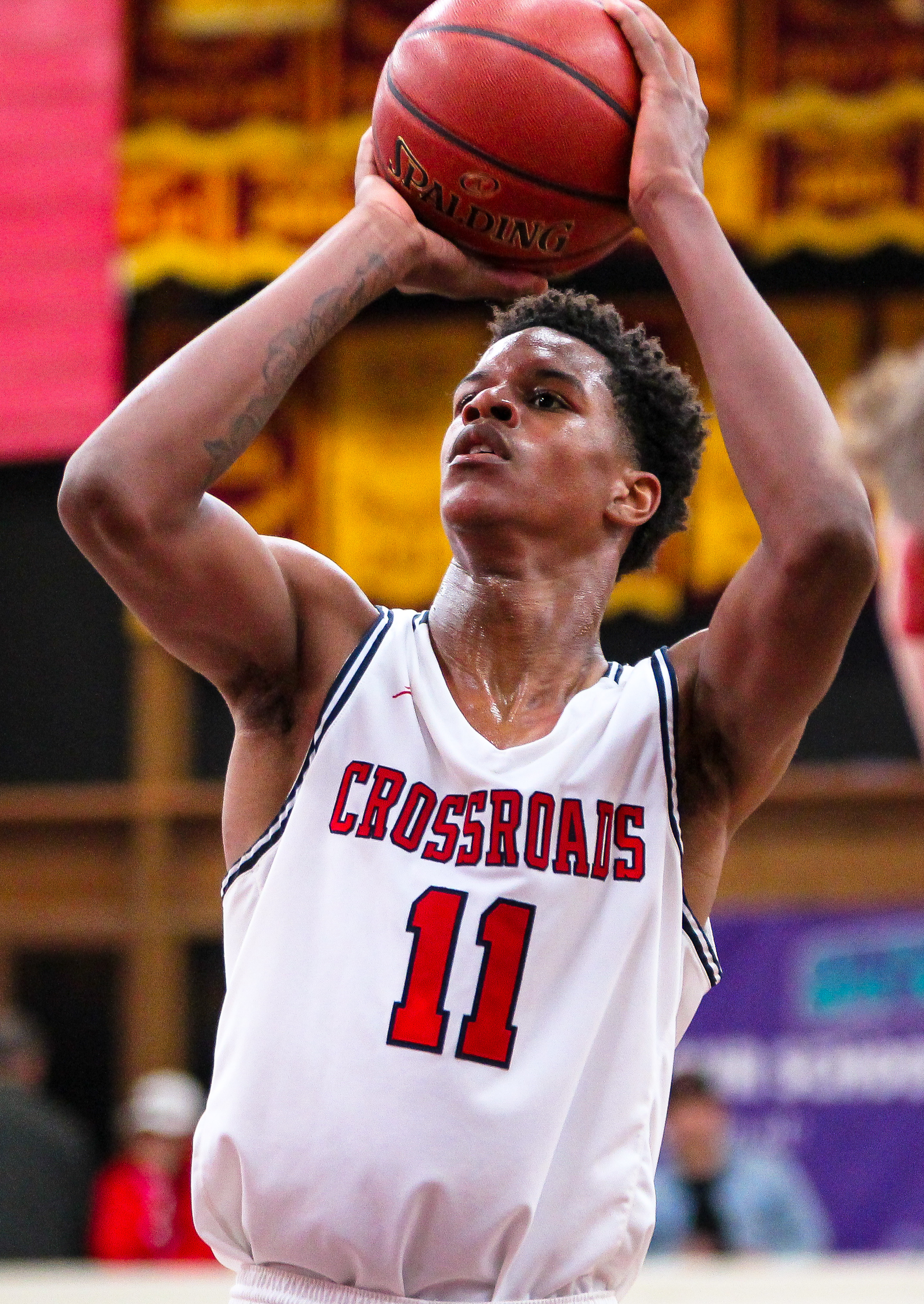
O'Neal with Crossroads School in 2017

In April 2017, O'Neal committed to play college basketball for Arizona. On February 24, 2018, he decommitted from Arizona immediately following allegations by ESPN that FBI wiretaps had intercepted phone conversations between Arizona coach Sean Miller and an agent discussing paying $100,000 to ensure star player Deandre Ayton signed with Arizona. Because he signed a nonbinding financial aid agreement with Arizona instead of a formal letter of intent, he did not require a release from Arizona to seek out a new school. O'Neal verbally committed to UCLA on February 27, but he did not sign a National Letter of Intent during the signing period that ended on May 16. He signed with the Bruins in August.

College recruiting
Name	Hometown	School	Height	Weight	Commit date
Shareef O'Neal; PF	Los Angeles, CA	Crossroads School (CA)	6 ft 9.5 in (2.07 m)	210 lb (95 kg)	Feb 27, 2018
Shareef O'Neal; PF	Recruit ratings: Rivals: 247Sports: ESPN: (89)				
Overall recruit ranking: Rivals: 40 247Sports: 52 ESPN: 32
Note: In many cases, Scout, Rivals, 247Sports, On3, and ESPN may conflict in their listings of height and weight.; In these cases, the average was taken. ESPN grades are on a 100-point scale.; Sources: "UCLA 2018 Basketball Commitments". Rivals.; "2018 UCLA Bruins Recruiting Class". ESPN.; "2018 Team Ranking". Rivals.

== College career ==
=== UCLA (2018–2020) ===
During practices over the summer, O'Neal began dealing with health issues, and was given a heart monitor by doctors to wear. On September 28, 2018, UCLA announced that he would miss the 2018–19 season but remain enrolled at the school as a medical redshirt. He was diagnosed with a heart condition by the UCLA medical staff, and underwent surgery in December. He played in the Drew League over the summer, and later in the Bruins' exhibition game. He wore a monitoring device during practice for post-surgery research on his heart but did not wear it during games.

In April 2019, UCLA hired Mick Cronin as their head coach to replace the fired Steve Alford. O'Neal made his UCLA debut in the 2019–20 season opener, playing six minutes without scoring against Long Beach State. On December 14, 2019, he had his best game of the season with eight points and a career-high 11 rebounds in a loss against Notre Dame. In a win against California on January 19, 2020, Cronin elected not to play O'Neal for the fifth time during the season. On January 22, O'Neal announced that he was leaving UCLA. He averaged 2.2 points and 2.9 rebounds in 10.2 minutes per game as a reserve for the Bruins, who were 9–9 at the time.

=== LSU (2020–2022) ===
On February 14, 2020, O'Neal announced that he was transferring to Louisiana State University, where his father played college basketball. O'Neal suffered a foot injury that kept him from the Tigers' first few conference games of the 2020–21 season, and was limited to 10 games played overall for the season. He missed the first 12 games of 2021–22 while recovering from his foot injury. He played in 14 games, averaging 2.9 points and 2.1 rebounds while playing an average of 9.4 minutes per game. After the season, he entered the transfer portal.

On June 6, 2022, O'Neal declared for the NBA draft after he was mistakenly placed on the list of early entrants who had withdrawn from the draft.

== Professional career ==
=== NBA G League Ignite (2022–2023) ===
After going undrafted in the 2022 NBA draft, O'Neal joined the Los Angeles Lakers in the 2022 NBA Summer League. On September 28, 2022, he signed with the NBA G League Ignite as a veteran player since he was draft eligible in the 2022 NBA draft. O'Neal was named to the G League's inaugural Next Up Game for the 2022–23 season.

On October 18, 2024, O'Neal signed with the Sacramento Kings, but was waived the next day. On October 27, he joined the Stockton Kings, but was then waived on November 7.

== Career statistics ==
Legend
GP	Games played	GS	Games started	MPG	Minutes per game
FG%	Field goal percentage	3P%	3-point field goal percentage	FT%	Free throw percentage
RPG	Rebounds per game	APG	Assists per game	SPG	Steals per game
BPG	Blocks per game	PPG	Points per game	**Bold**	Career high

=== College ===
Year	Team	GP	GS	MPG	FG%	3P%	FT%	RPG	APG	SPG	BPG	PPG
2018–19	UCLA	Medical Redshirt										
2019–20	UCLA	13	0	10.2	.321	**.333**	.474	2.9	**.2**	.3	.2	2.2
2020–21	LSU	10	0	**14.5**	.375	.182	**.500**	**4.4**	.0	**.5**	**.5**	2.8
2021–22	LSU	**14**	0	9.2	**.500**	.143	.467	2.1	.1	.1	.4	**2.9**
Career		37	0	11.0	.405	.208	.480	3.0	.1	.3	.4	2.6
