= Moses Brown (basketball) =

American basketball player (born 1999)

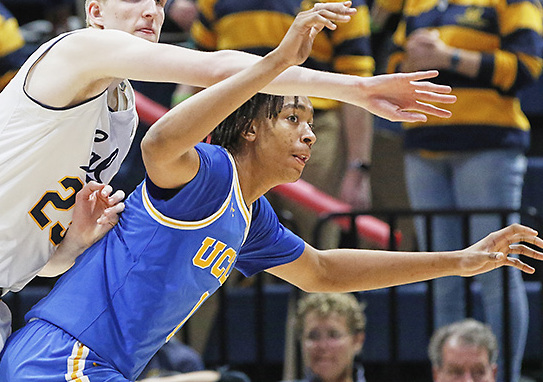
- Brown (right) with UCLA in 2019

No. 34 – Guangzhou Loong Lions
- Position: Center
- League: CBA

Personal information
- Born: October 13, 1999 (age 27) New York City, New York, U.S.
- Listed height: 7 ft 2 in (2.18 m)
- Listed weight: 258 lb (117 kg)

Career information
- High school: Archbishop Molloy (New York City, New York)
- College: UCLA (2018–2019)
- NBA draft: 2019: undrafted
- Playing career: 2019–present

Career history
- 2019–2020: Portland Trail Blazers
- 2019–2020: →Texas Legends
- 2020–2021: Oklahoma City Thunder
- 2021: →Oklahoma City Blue
- 2021–2022: Dallas Mavericks
- 2021–2022: →Texas Legends
- 2022: Cleveland Cavaliers
- 2022–2023: Los Angeles Clippers
- 2023: →Ontario Clippers
- 2023: Westchester Knicks
- 2023: Brooklyn Nets
- 2023–2024: Portland Trail Blazers
- 2023–2024: →Rip City Remix
- 2024–2025: Westchester Knicks
- 2024: Indiana Pacers
- 2025: Dallas Mavericks
- 2025–2026: Grand Rapids Gold
- 2026: Criollos de Caguas
- 2026–present: Guangzhou Loong Lions

Career highlights
- All-NBA G League First Team (2021); All-NBA G League Second Team (2025); 2x NBA G League All-Defensive Team (2021, 2025); BSN Defensive Player of the Year (2026); BSN rebounding leader (2026); BSN blocks leader (2026); Pac-12 All-Freshman Team (2019); McDonald's All-American (2018)
- Stats at NBA.com
- Stats at Basketball Reference

Moses Shirief-Lamar Brown (born October 13, 1999) is an American professional basketball player for the Guangzhou Loong Lions of the Chinese Basketball Association (CBA). A 7-foot-2-inch (2.18 m) center, Brown was named a McDonald's All-American as a high school senior in 2018, and in his only collegiate year playing for the UCLA Bruins, he was voted to the all-freshman team in the Pac-12 Conference. After going undrafted in the 2019 NBA draft, Brown spent his rookie season on a two-way contract with the Portland Trail Blazers.

He has also played for the Oklahoma City Thunder, Cleveland Cavaliers, Los Angeles Clippers, Brooklyn Nets, Indiana Pacers, and Dallas Mavericks.

== Early life ==
Brown was born in New York City to Malcolm Brown and Wanda Williams. His father Malcolm was a 6-foot-7-inch (2.01 m) center in junior college. Brown attended Archbishop Molloy High School in Queens, arriving with limited fanfare as a 6-foot-8-inch (2.03 m) freshman. He was promoted to varsity in his second year, and flourished after growing 6 inches (15 cm) and 100 pounds (45 kg). In his junior year, he led Molloy to the Catholic High School Athletic Association (CHSAA) finals, where the Stanners lost 64–62 in an upset by Cardinal Hayes.

As a senior, Brown and junior guard Cole Anthony, son of former NBA first-round draft pick Greg Anthony, formed one of the top duos in all of high school basketball, as well as in Molloy's history. They led the school to the CHSAA's semifinals. Brown was voted the league's most valuable player (MVP). He was named a McDonald's All-American, becoming the school's first player to garner the honor since Kenny Anderson in 1989. Brown earned MVP honors in the Ballislife All-American Game.

== College career ==
Brown chose to play for UCLA over Kentucky, Maryland and Florida State. Rated a five-star prospect, he was the top newcomer in the Bruins recruiting class for 2018–19 that ranked in the top-10 nationally and also included Shareef O'Neal, son of Hall of Famer Shaquille O'Neal. Brown provided the Bruins with a replacement at center for the graduated Thomas Welsh. Although he stood 7-foot-1-inch (2.16 m), there was concern that Brown was underweight at 235 pounds (107 kg). UCLA coach Steve Alford believed that he might still be growing and had "his best basketball ahead of him."

Brown was inconsistent as a freshman, dominating some games while being a nonfactor in others. In the season opener, he scored 19 points on 9-of-10 shooting, including five slam dunks, and had 17 rebounds in a 96–71 win over Purdue Fort Wayne. He was the first UCLA player to have 19 points and 17 rebounds in his college debut since Lew Alcindor, known later as Kareem Abdul-Jabbar. (Note: Alcindor had 56 points and 21 rebounds as a sophomore against USC on December 3, 1966. At the time, freshman were ineligible to play varsity.) On November 16, 2018, Brown had 23 points and 14 rebounds in a 95–58 win over Saint Francis to become the first UCLA freshman to record a double-double in his first three games. He nearly had a triple-double with eight blocks in 29 minutes, having left the game for good with around six minutes remaining. After facing smaller post players from small-program schools, Brown struggled offensively against Nick Ward of No. 11 Michigan State with only five points, 10 rebounds and three blocks in an 87–67 loss to the Spartans in the Las Vegas Invitational. In the consolation game, UCLA dropped its second straight contest to a top-15 team, losing to No. 7 North Carolina as Brown played just eight minutes before fouling out. On December 2, he had 12 points, 10 rebounds, and three blocks in an 82–58 win over Loyola Marymount. It was his first double-double since the third game of the season, and it came in his first matchup against a fellow 7-footer, the Lions' 7-foot-3-inch (2.21 m) Mattias Markusson. On January 26, 2019, Brown snapped out of a two-week slump with 11 points, 15 rebounds and two blocks to help the Bruins end a three-game losing streak in a 90–69 win over Arizona. He missed the regular season finale against Utah due to an unspecified violation of the school's student-athlete code of conduct.

Brown finished the season averaging 9.7 points and a team-leading 8.3 rebounds, and ranked fourth in the Pac-12 Conference with 1.9 blocks per game. He was named to the Pac-12 All-Freshman Team and was an honorable mention for the conference's all-defensive team. After the season, he declared for the NBA draft.

== Professional career ==
=== Portland Trail Blazers / Texas Legends (2019–2020) ===
Brown went undrafted in the 2019 NBA draft. He joined the Houston Rockets for the 2019 NBA Summer League, playing briefly in one game.

On September 9, 2019, Brown signed a training camp contract with the Portland Trail Blazers. He played in all five preseason games, averaging 5.2 points, 2.2 rebounds and 1.0 blocks in 6.9 minutes. On October 18, the Trail Blazers converted his deal into a two-way contract. On October 27, they assigned him to the Texas Legends of the NBA G League. He was transferred back to Portland on November 9 amid multiple injuries to their frontcourt, including centers Pau Gasol and Jusuf Nurkić. Brown was sent to the G League on January 26, 2020. On February 29, Brown posted a career-high 25 points and 10 rebounds for Texas in a win over the Northern Arizona Suns. He appeared in nine total games for Portland, while playing in 30 for Texas and averaging 14.4 points on a team-high 64.1 field goal percentage in 19.4 minutes with team-highs of 7.7 rebounds and 1.3 blocks per game.

=== Oklahoma City Thunder / Blue (2020–2021) ===
On December 9, 2020, Brown signed a two-way contract with the Oklahoma City Thunder. He played in the G League with the Oklahoma City Blue. For the week ending February 23, 2021, he was voted the G League Player of the Week after leading the Blue to a 5–0 record while averaging 19.8 points, 15.0 rebounds, 2.3 blocks and 1.3 steals per game. He was named to the All-NBA G League First Team after season averages of 18.5 points, 13.9 rebounds and 1.9 blocks in 26.4 minutes per game. He was also placed on the NBA G League All-Defensive Team.

On March 14, Brown made his first career start for the Thunder, replacing a resting Al Horford in a game against the Memphis Grizzlies. In his second consecutive start on March 16 against the Chicago Bulls, he had 20 points and 16 rebounds for his first career double-double, which he already notched by halftime with 14 points and 10 rebounds. It was his fourth straight game setting a career high in points, which set a Thunder team record. He also had five blocks to become just the second player in team history to record 20+ points, 15+ rebounds and 5+ blocks in a game. On March 27, Oklahoma City announced that Horford would sit out the rest of the season as the team prioritized developing its younger players. That evening, Brown had career-highs of 21 points and 23 rebounds in a loss to the Boston Celtics. The rebounds tied a team record set by Steven Adams in 2018, and his 19 rebounds by halftime set a team record for rebounds in a half. Brown had the second-fastest double-double in Thunder history (8 minutes, 11 seconds). The following day, the Thunder announced that they had signed Brown to a multi-year, standard NBA contract. He had been averaging 12.4 points, 12.3 rebounds and 1.6 blocks in 27.7 minutes per game since returning from the G League. In the season finale against the Los Angeles Clippers, he had career-highs of 24 points and seven blocks, while also adding 18 rebounds. He ended the season with averages of 8.6 points and 8.9 rebounds.

=== Dallas Mavericks / Return to Legends (2021–2022) ===
On June 18, 2021, Brown was traded to the Boston Celtics along with Al Horford and a 2025 second round pick in exchange for Kemba Walker, the 16th pick of the 2021 NBA draft, and a 2025 second-rounder. On July 31, 2021, Brown was traded to the Dallas Mavericks in exchange for Josh Richardson. Dallas guaranteed his contract, but he did not develop into the player they expected. On February 10, 2022, he was waived by the Mavericks, freeing up a roster spot for them to land the players acquired in a trade that sent Kristaps Porziņģis to the Washington Wizards.

=== Cleveland Cavaliers (2022) ===
On March 10, 2022, the Cleveland Cavaliers announced that they had signed Brown to a 10-day contract, following an injury sustained by Jarrett Allen. He played in four games before re-signing with the Cavaliers on a second 10-day contract on March 21. On March 31, he signed a two-way contract with the Cavaliers and on April 10, they converted it into a standard contract.

=== Los Angeles / Ontario Clippers (2022–2023) ===
In July 2022, Brown signed a training camp contract with the Los Angeles Clippers, which was later converted to a two-way contract with their Ontario G League affiliate. On February 17, 2023, he was waived by the Clippers. He had been active for 50 NBA games, the limit for a two-way player, and the Clippers would have needed to sign him to an end-of-season contract to retain him. Brown appeared in 34 games for the Clippers and made one start, averaging 4.6 points and 4.1 rebounds while making 63.5% of his field goals.

=== Westchester Knicks (2023) ===
On March 8, 2023, Brown signed a two-way contract with the New York Knicks. He was waived four days later on March 12, having only played in one game for their G League affiliate, the Westchester Knicks.

=== Brooklyn Nets (2023) ===
On March 17, 2023, Brown was signed to a 10-day contract by the Brooklyn Nets. On March 28, he was re-signed to a second 10-day contract.

=== Return to Portland / Rip City Remix (2023–2024) ===
Brown joined the Toronto Raptors for the 2023 NBA Summer League. On August 22, 2023, Brown signed again with the Portland Trail Blazers.

=== Return to Westchester (2024) ===
Brown joined the Los Angeles Lakers for the 2024 NBA Summer League. On October 9, 2024, Brown signed with the New York Knicks, but was waived the next day. On October 28, he joined the Westchester Knicks.

=== Indiana Pacers (2024) ===
On November 20, 2024, Brown signed with the Indiana Pacers, but was waived on December 9.

=== Third stint with Westchester (2024–2025) ===
On December 15, 2024, Brown returned to the Westchester Knicks for a third stint.

=== Return to Dallas (2025) ===
On February 20, 2025, Brown signed a 10-day contract with the Dallas Mavericks. He appeared in four of the Mavericks' last five games, and he started the last two while averaging 19.0 points, 10.0 rebounds, 1.5 steals and 1.0 blocks in 26.5 minutes in the most recent pair of contests.

=== Fourth stint with Westchester (2025) ===
On March 2, 2025, following the expiration of his contract with the Mavericks, Brown returned to Westchester. On April 3, Brown broke the G League record for the most rebounds in a playoff game, logging 26 rebounds and 27 points against the Maine Celtics.

=== Grand Rapids Gold (2025–2026) ===
Brown joined the Houston Rockets for the 2025 NBA Summer League. On September 12, 2025, Brown agreed to an Exhibit 10 contract with the Denver Nuggets, according to sources from HoopsHype. He was waived by the Nuggets prior to the start of the regular season on October 18.

=== Criollos de Caguas (2026) ===
On March 18, 2026, Brown signed with the Criollos de Caguas of the Baloncesto Superior Nacional. On March 31, Brown made his debut against the Cangrejeros de Santurce where he had 19 points, 10 rebounds, and six blocks, winning 90–86. On April 13, he recorded a season–high 23 points, 16 rebounds, and three blocks in a 105–92 victory over the Mets de Guaynabo.

Brown won the 2026 Defensive Player of the Year award; alongside MVP Travis Trice and Sixth Man of the Year Christian Lopez, they became the first trio of teammates in league history to win all three major individual awards in the same season.

== Career statistics ==
Legend
GP	Games played	GS	Games started	MPG	Minutes per game
FG%	Field goal percentage	3P%	3-point field goal percentage	FT%	Free throw percentage
RPG	Rebounds per game	APG	Assists per game	SPG	Steals per game
BPG	Blocks per game	PPG	Points per game	**Bold**	Career high

=== NBA ===
Year	Team	GP	GS	MPG	FG%	3P%	FT%	RPG	APG	SPG	BPG	PPG
2019–20	Portland	9	0	3.6	.400	—	.375	1.6	.1	.1	.1	1.2
2020–21	Oklahoma City	**43**	**32**	**21.4**	.545	—	.619	**8.9**	.2	.7	**1.1**	8.6
2021–22	Dallas	26	1	6.5	.540	—	.628	2.3	.0	.1	.3	3.1
2021–22	Cleveland	14	5	12.5	.638	—	.552	5.3	.0	.3	.5	6.4
2022–23	L.A. Clippers	34	1	8.5	.635	—	.458	4.1	.1	.1	.4	4.6
2022–23	Brooklyn	2	0	3.2	—	—	—	.0	.0	.5	.0	.0
2023–24	Portland	22	5	9.1	.508	—	.290	3.9	.3	.2	.3	3.4
2024–25	Indiana	9	0	5.1	.650	—	.600	1.4	.0	.2	.1	3.2
2024–25	Dallas	4	2	18.2	**.724**	—	**.833**	7.8	**.5**	**1.0**	.8	**11.8**
Career		163	46	11.7	.574	—	.544	4.9	.2	.3	.5	5.3

=== College ===
Year	Team	GP	GS	MPG	FG%	3P%	FT%	RPG	APG	SPG	BPG	PPG
2018–19	UCLA	32	31	23.4	.607	—	.352	8.3	.3	.6	1.9	9.7
