= Huntington Prep School =

Coordinates: 38°25′9″N 82°26′9″W

Huntington Expression Prep School

Location
- 600 13th St; Huntington, West Virginia; United States

Information
- Type: Private, Basketball-focused, college preparatory school
- Founded: 2009
- Founder: Rob Fulford
- Colors: Navy, Yellow, and Light Blue
- Nickname: Irish
- Team name: Huntington Prep Irish
- Affiliation: Huntington High School

Huntington Prep or Huntington Expression Prep is a basketball-focused college preparatory school located in Huntington, West Virginia. Huntington Prep was originally unrelated to the public Huntington High School located in the same city, though now Huntington Prep players go to school at Huntington High after Huntington Prep's host relationship with St. Joseph Central Catholic High School ended in 2020.

== School ==
Huntington Prep was originally housed within St. Joseph Central Catholic High School, a religious school, but in 2020 ended that relationship. The students were regular St. Joseph's students and had to abide by the rules and regulations of the high school. After becoming an accepted part of the school, Huntington Prep became Huntington St. Joseph Prep (even wearing the St. Joe emblem on the uniforms). Since 2021, Huntington Prep became part of Cabell County Schools after they moved host schools to Huntington High School.

== Basketball program ==
Huntington Prep is a highly ranked basketball program and features some of the world's top high school-level players.

The team practices at the Marshall University Rec Center and resides in Huntington, West Virginia, with "home" games formerly played at the now demolished Veterans Memorial Fieldhouse, then the St. Joseph High School gym. They now play at Huntington High School, with some home games scheduled at Marshall University's Cam Henderson Center.

Huntington Prep's first player to be drafted in the NBA was former Louisville Cardinal and national champion Gorgui Dieng in 2013, and was later selected 21st overall by the Utah Jazz. Later that year in 2013, Andrew Wiggins was the number one pick in the 2014 NBA draft after playing college basketball for the University of Kansas.

== Notable alumni ==
- Gorgui Dieng (2010), basketball player who played for ten seasons in the NBA for four teams
- Sim Bhullar (2012), basketball player who played for the Sacramento Kings, first player of Indian descent to play in the NBA
- Javontae Hawkins (2012 - transferred), basketball player who plays professionally in the Israeli Basketball Premier League
- Stefan Jankovic (2012), basketball player who played professionally in the P. League+ in Taiwan.
- Moses Kingsley (2013), basketball player who played professionally in the Greek Basket League
- Xavier Rathan-Mayes (2013), basketball player who played for the Memphis Grizzlies
- Andrew Wiggins (2013), basketball player for the Golden State Warriors, NBA All-Star
- Josh Perkins (2014), basketball player who plays professionally in Mexico
- Thomas Bryant (2015), basketball player for the Cleveland Cavaliers
- Miles Bridges (2016), basketball player for the Phoenix Suns
- Onuralp Bitim (2017), basketball player who played for the Chicago Bulls
- Chris Smith (2017), basketball player who plays professionally in Israel
- Keldon Johnson (2018 - transferred), basketball player for the San Antonio Spurs
- Jaemyn Brakefield (2020), basketball player for the Ole Miss Rebels
- Jonathan Kuminga (2021 - transferred), basketball player for the Golden State Warriors
- Joshua Primo (2021 - transferred), basketball player who played for the San Antonio Spurs and Los Angeles Clippers
- JT Thor (2021 - transferred), basketball player for the Cleveland Cavaliers
- Cruz Davis (2022), basketball player for the Texas Tech Red Raiders
- Trentyn Flowers (2024 - transferred), basketball player for the Los Angeles Clippers
- Darryn Peterson (2025 - transferred), basketball player for the Utah Jazz.

== See also ==
- Huntington High School
- St. Joseph Central Catholic High School
