= Garfield High School (Seattle) =

Public high school in Seattle, Washington

Coordinates: 47°36′18″N 122°18′6″W

James A. Garfield High School
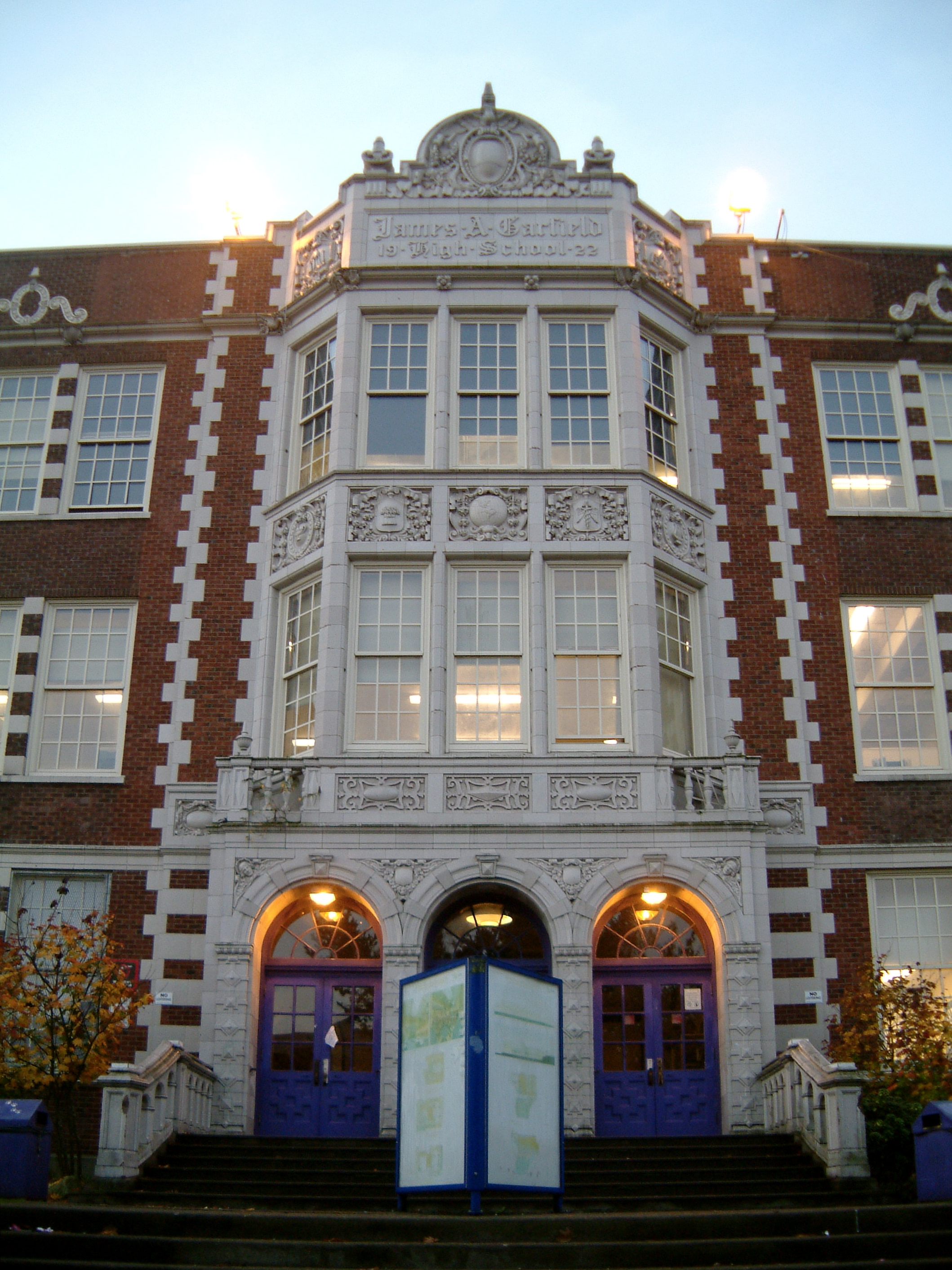
- 400 23rd Avenue; Seattle, Washington, U.S. United States

Information
- Type: Public
- Established: 1920
- Principal: George Breland (interim)
- Teaching staff: 68.30 (FTE)
- Grades: 9-12
- Enrollment: 1,641 (2023–24)
- Student to teacher ratio: 24.03
- Colors: Purple & White
- Mascot: Bulldog
- Newspaper: The Messenger
- Website: Garfield High School

James A. Garfield High School is a public high school in the Seattle Public Schools district of Seattle, Washington. It is named after James A. Garfield, the 20th President of the United States. The school is located at 400 23rd Avenue between E. Alder and E. Jefferson Streets in the Central District section of Seattle.

Garfield is a high school designated to serve students identified by the district as academically highly gifted, so the school offers many college-level classes, ranging from calculus-based physics to Advanced Placement (AP) studio art.

== History ==
=== 20th century ===
James A. Garfield High School was founded in 1920 as East High School at its current location. The first graduating class consisted of 282 students who transferred from Broadway High School. In three years, the school's enrollment forced the 12-room building to be scrapped for the Jacobean-style building designed by Floyd Naramore. In 1929, the city commissioned the architect to design an addition for the school as enrollment peaked at 2,300 students.

Garfield High School has long played a key role in its neighborhood, the Central District. As the Central District has changed, so has the school's population. In its early decades, the school was noted for its Jewish, Japanese and Italian populations. After World War II, the neighborhood became predominantly African-American and by 1961, 51 percent of Garfield students were black, compared to only 5.3 percent of the general Seattle school district population.

In the late 1960s and 1970s, Garfield was at the center of the school district's attempts to avoid desegregation busing through various plans, including turning it into a "magnet school". This began the focus on music and science that persist to the present day. The school introduced an APP Program in 1979, and due to the success of this program, an alternative program, IBx, was opened for APP students at Ingraham International High School in North Seattle to help relieve pressure on an overcrowded Garfield.

Martin Luther King Jr., Jesse Jackson, and Stokely Carmichael are among notable people who have spoken at the school.

=== 21st century ===
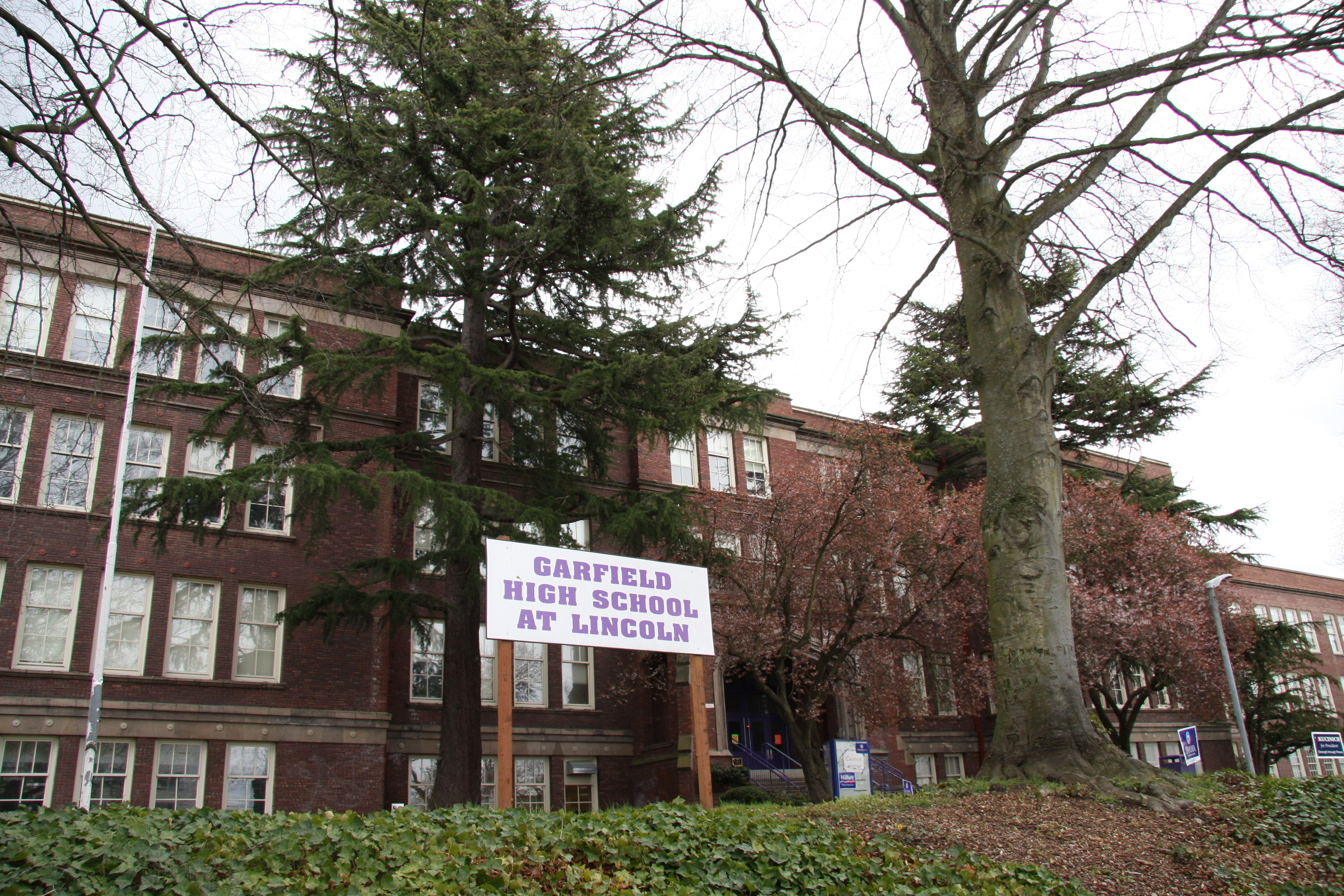
Garfield High School, located on the grounds of the former Lincoln High School in Wallingford, Washington

The buildings have lasted for more than eight decades, but they were partially demolished in a sweeping redesign of the school that began in June 2006. The remodel was mostly completed by the fall of 2008, making the class of 2009 the only class to attend classes in both the old and new buildings. There was a movement to hold off the remodeling to preserve the building's history, including a city initiative to preserve the Quincy Jones auditorium as a historic site, thereby blocking the remodeling. The new design has a state-of-the-art performing arts center. After its renovation, Garfield had become the second most expensive high school in the state, after Stadium High School, with Stadium High at $106 million and Garfield at $105 million.

The school reopened in time for 2008 classes on September 3. Faculty and students vacated their temporary quarters at Lincoln High School at the end of the 2007–2008 school year.

In March 2006, then U.S. Senator Barack Obama spoke at the school on innovation in education.

==== Terracotta work ====
Garfield High School's architecture makes extensive use of terracotta. Among the many terracotta details worked into the building are emblems of botany, the trades, arts and crafts, industry, intelligence, and the sciences.

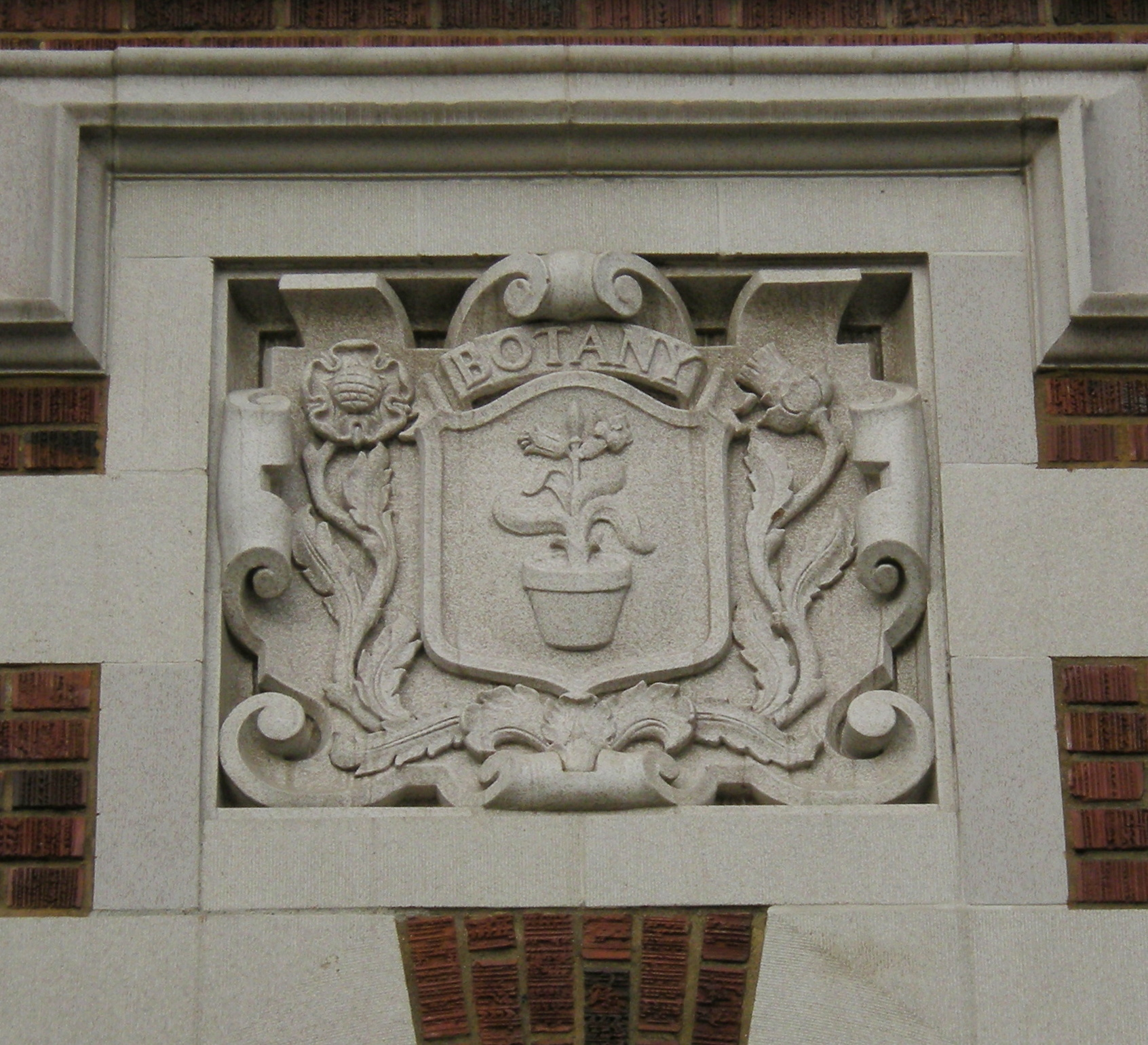
"Botany" (south face)

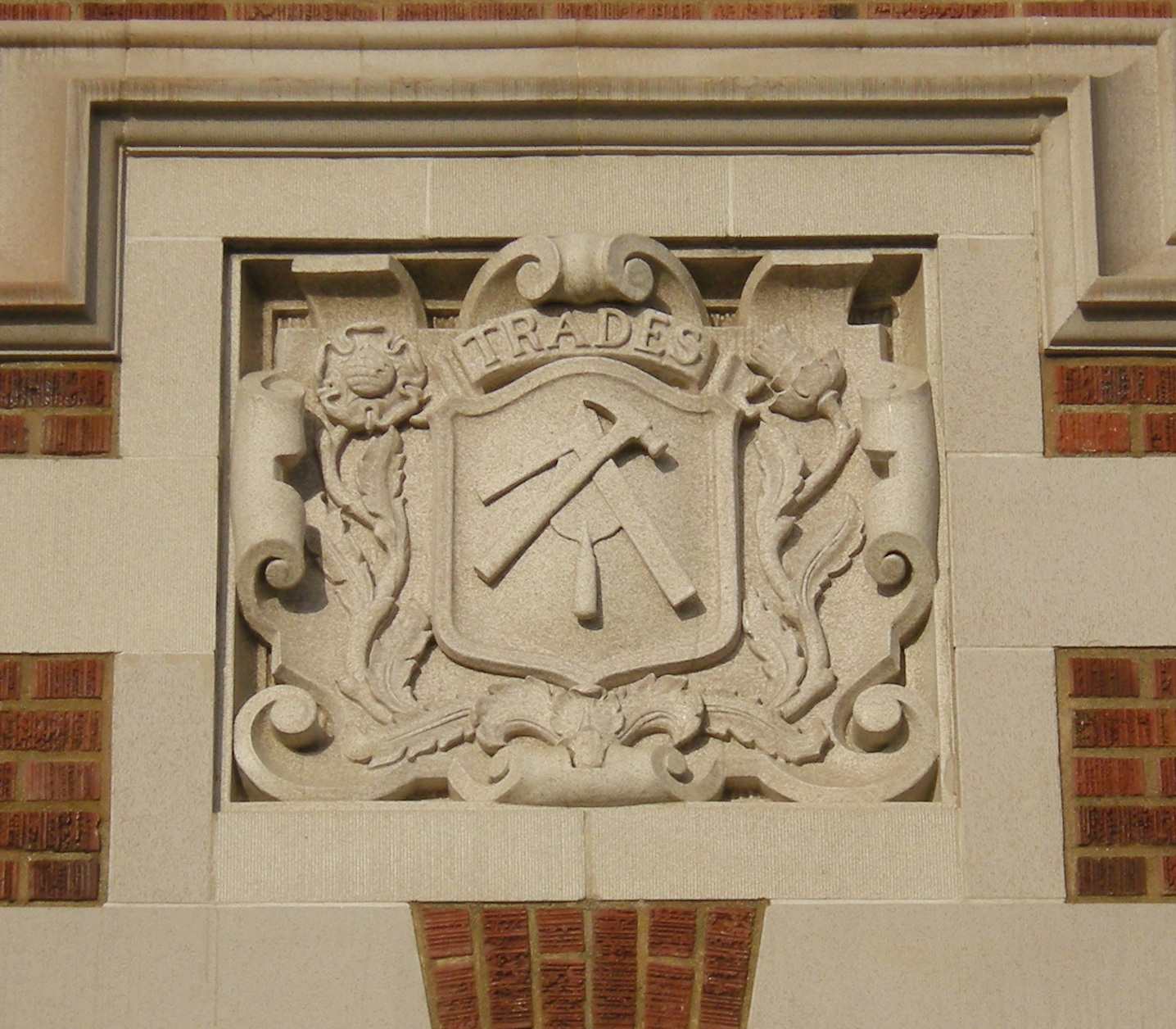
"Trades" (south face)

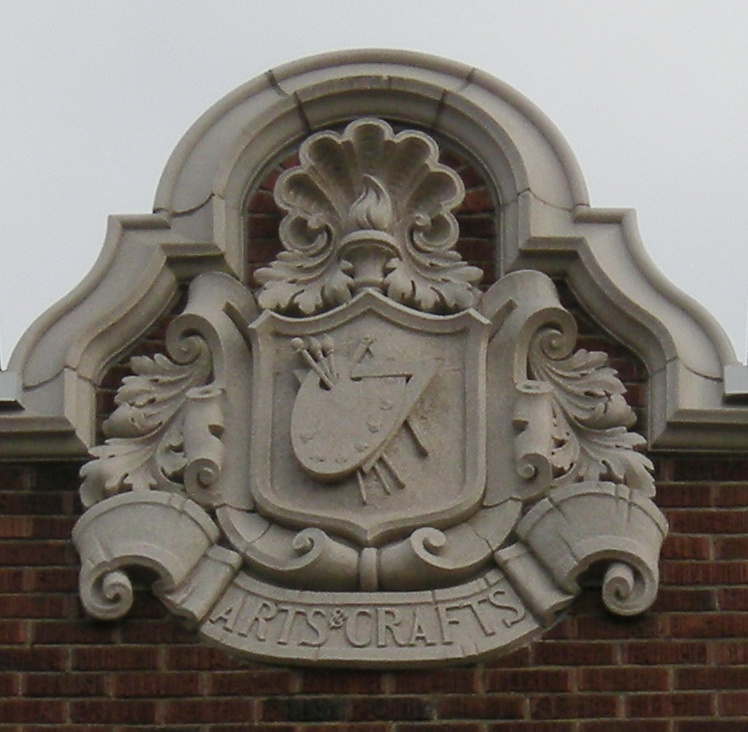
"Arts & Crafts" (west face)

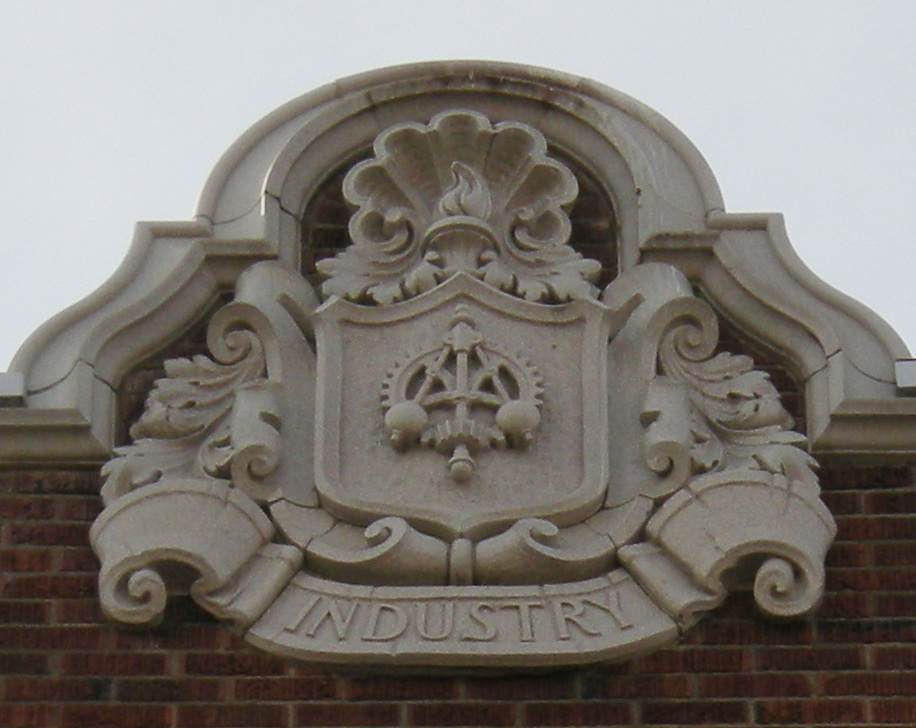
"Industry" (east face)

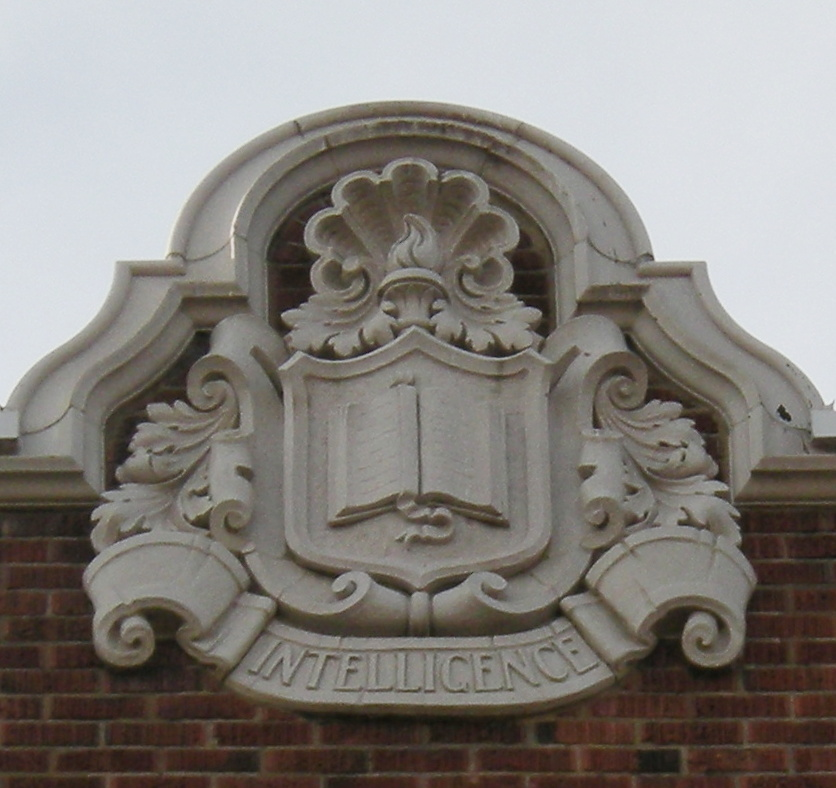
"Intelligence" (east face)

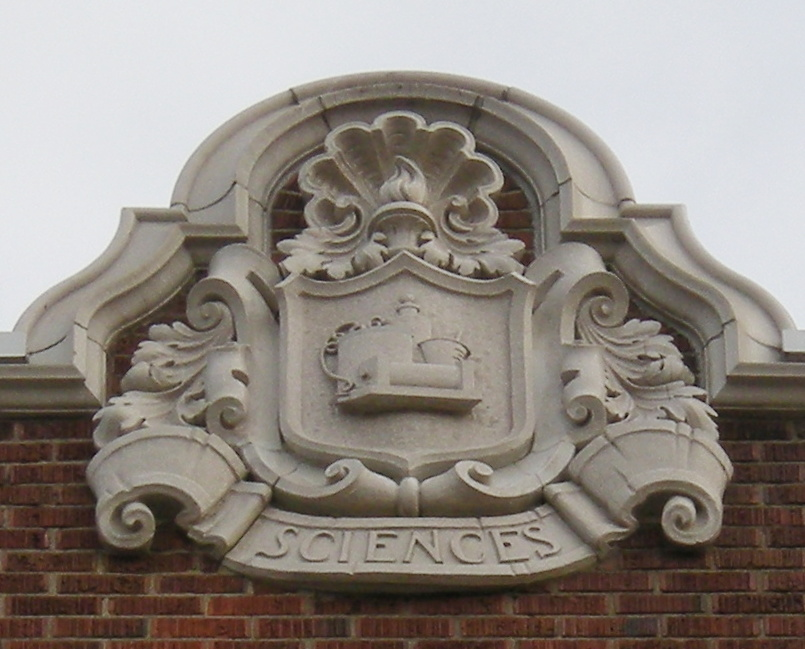
"Sciences" (west face)

==== Incidents ====
- In 2012, during a school field trip, one of the school's students allegedly raped another student. The school's mishandling of the ensuing investigation resulted in a federal investigation of the school district for Title IX sexual violence violations.
- In June 2024, junior student Amarr Murphy-Paine was shot and killed outside the school after attempting to break up a fight between two other students.

== Academics ==
Of the approximately 400 students who graduated in 2011, 70 percent planned to attend four-year colleges, and 20 percent planned to attend two-year colleges. Garfield has over 200 students in IEP (Individualized Learning) and ELL (English Language Learners) programs, along with 415 APP (Accelerated Progress Program) students. The school currently offers 21 Advanced Placement courses and 10 honors courses. In 2012, the mean reading, math and writing SAT scores for Garfield students were 575, 578 and 569, respectively. Languages offered are Spanish, French, and Japanese.

Garfield was one of 14 schools in King County, Washington, in 2007 to receive the "School of Distinction" award from the office of superintendent of public instruction for making the most progress over six years in reading and writing on the WASL. The school won a silver medal of distinction from U.S. News & World Report in 2008 and 2009 for being among the top-performing high schools in terms of college readiness, and continues to be highly rated.

Each year there are many valedictorians, most of whom go on to top universities. Over time, the school has faced criticism that its AP and honors programs excluded students of color, leading to the 2017 implementation of "Honors for All," in which all students are placed in honors level language arts and social studies courses. During the 2006–2007 school year Garfield offered more than 120 different classes across nine departments, including an extensive selection of advanced classes. Garfield students can take classes from local colleges through a program called Running Start. Some students attend on-campus courses at the University of Washington.

=== Testing controversy ===
In January 2013, the entire teaching body of Garfield High School refused to administer the standardized Measures of Academic Progress, or MAP, which is administered system-wide, three times per year. The teachers called the tests useless and a waste of instructional time. After their protest became public, teachers at local schools nearby such as Ballard High School and Chief Sealth International High School joined the movement. The American Federation of Teachers has endorsed the school's boycott of the tests.

== Athletics ==
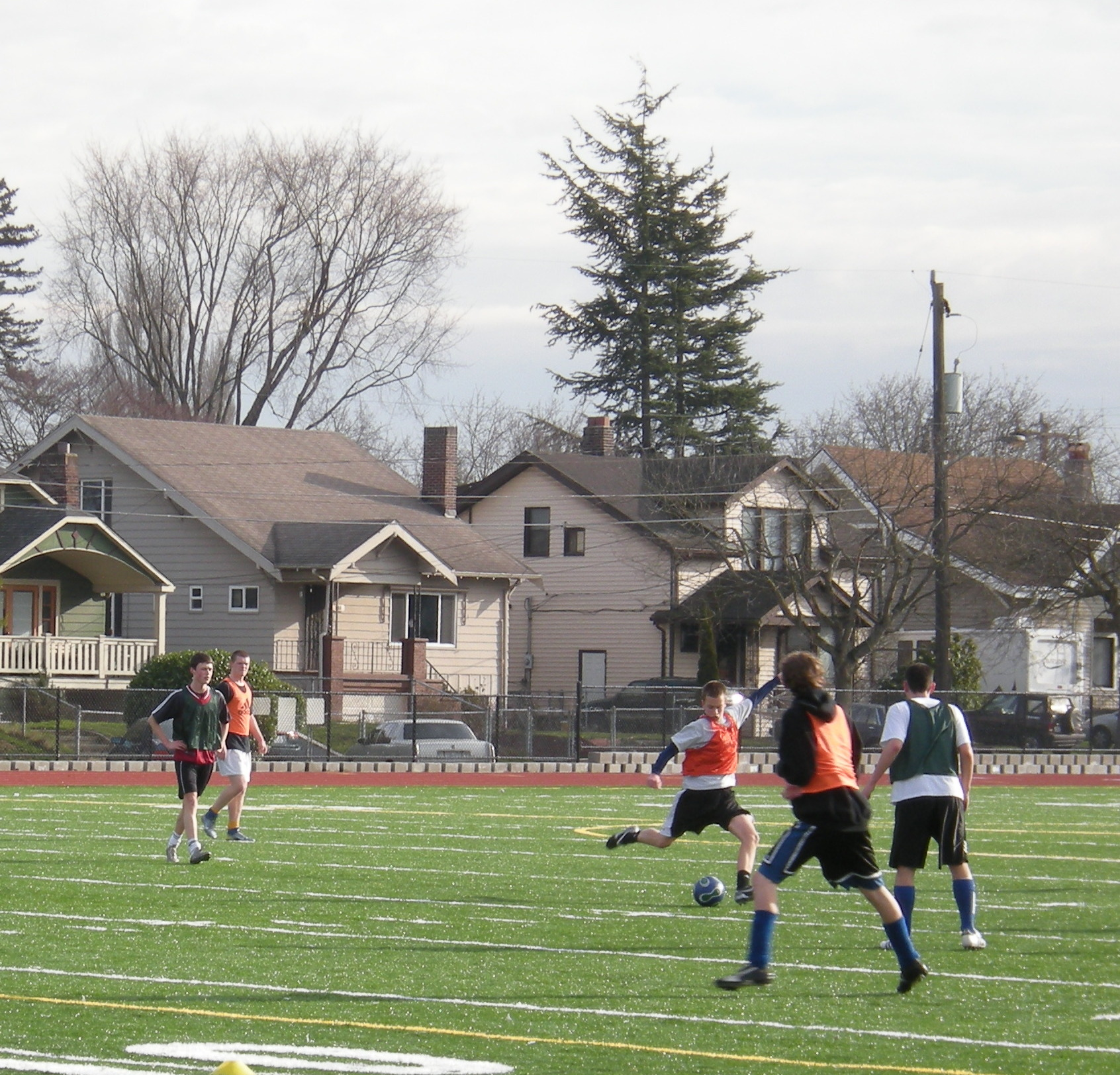
Garfield soccer players practicing on a cold January Saturday

Garfield athletics have been strong historically. Athletic successes for the 1950s included four city football championships, two tennis titles, two baseball championships, and a state AA tournament trophy in basketball. The boys basketball team has won the most Washington state championships in state history.

Garfield basketball teams have won many regional and state titles. The boys basketball team has won the state championship 16 times and was the runner-up eight times since 1949. The team has notable alumni, including Brandon Roy (GHS c/o 2002), Tony Wroten (GHS c/o 2011), and University of Washington alumnus Will Conroy. The girls team boasts alumna Joyce Walker (GHS c/o 1980), who is best known as the third woman to join the Harlem Globetrotters. Both the girls and boys teams were state champions in 1980, 1987, 2020 and 2023. The girls team also won state championships in 2005, 2022 and 2024. The win in 2024 was the fourth consecutive state championship for the girls (as no champion was crowned during the 2021 pandemic year).

In 2001, the boys swimming and diving team won the state championship. In 2007, the girls swimming and diving team won the state championship.

Garfield won state titles in boys and girls track in 1987 and 2017. The boys cross country team won the Metro League championship in 2016.

The football team made national headlines when they knelt during the U.S. national anthem to protest an allegedly racist verse continued within and police brutality in the United States. Their protest continued for the entirety of the 2016 season. Players on the team stated that they had received death threats and had their car's tires slashed due to the protests.

The fastpitch softball team in 2019 swept the postseason, winning the Metro League championship, Sea-King District championship, and WIAA 3A State Championship. The team defeated Yelm 10–6 to become the first Seattle school to take the state title. The fast pitch team also placed 4th in state in 2024 and 2nd in state in 2025, with a nail biting 11-inning semi-finale game.

== Programs, clubs, and activities ==
=== Drama ===
In 2005, Garfield's performance of Cabaret won the Outstanding Program and Poster Design award and Special Honors in Educational Impact and Student Achievement from the 5th Avenue Theatre. Subsequent musicals have been unable to enter the 5th Avenue Awards due to scheduling. One of the main draws of Garfield's drama program is its large student-led Drama Club, an important element that is missing from many other local area schools. The Garfield Drama Club produces collections of short one-act plays, all of which are directed and produced by current students. The department also performs three teacher-directed shows per year: an Autumn Play, a Children's Show for local elementary schools, and a Spring Musical. A notable element of Garfield's drama program is that student leadership is present in all areas of theater. Student stage managers often help the director lead the production, while students run the costuming, hair and makeup, lighting, sound and set design programs. Musical direction is run by Garfield's choir teacher, who is sometimes assisted by a student assistant musical director.

=== Newspaper ===
The Messenger is Garfield's monthly student-run newspaper. The Messenger has earned awards from the Journalism Education Association and the National Scholastic Press Association, placing in Best of Show in the JEA/NSPA Spring National High School Journalism Conventions and winning its most prestigious honor, the Pacemaker Award, in 1997 and 2006. A column from the paper was reprinted by All About Jazz in 2004.

In 2006 and 2007, staff reporters won the NSPA's Brasler Prize.

=== Robotics ===
Garfield has two FIRST Tech Challenge robotics teams: team 4042, Nonstandard Deviation and team 12788, Ultraviolet. Team 4042 was founded in 2009, and received the Rockwell Collins Innovate award at the 2018 West-Super Regional Championship and Washington State Championship, ultimately attending the Houston FIRST Championship in April 2018.

=== Policy debate ===
Garfield is one of two schools in Seattle Public Schools with an active policy debate program. One of Garfield's teams beat Ingraham in the finals of the 2019 season's culminating tournament to become state champions.

== Music ==
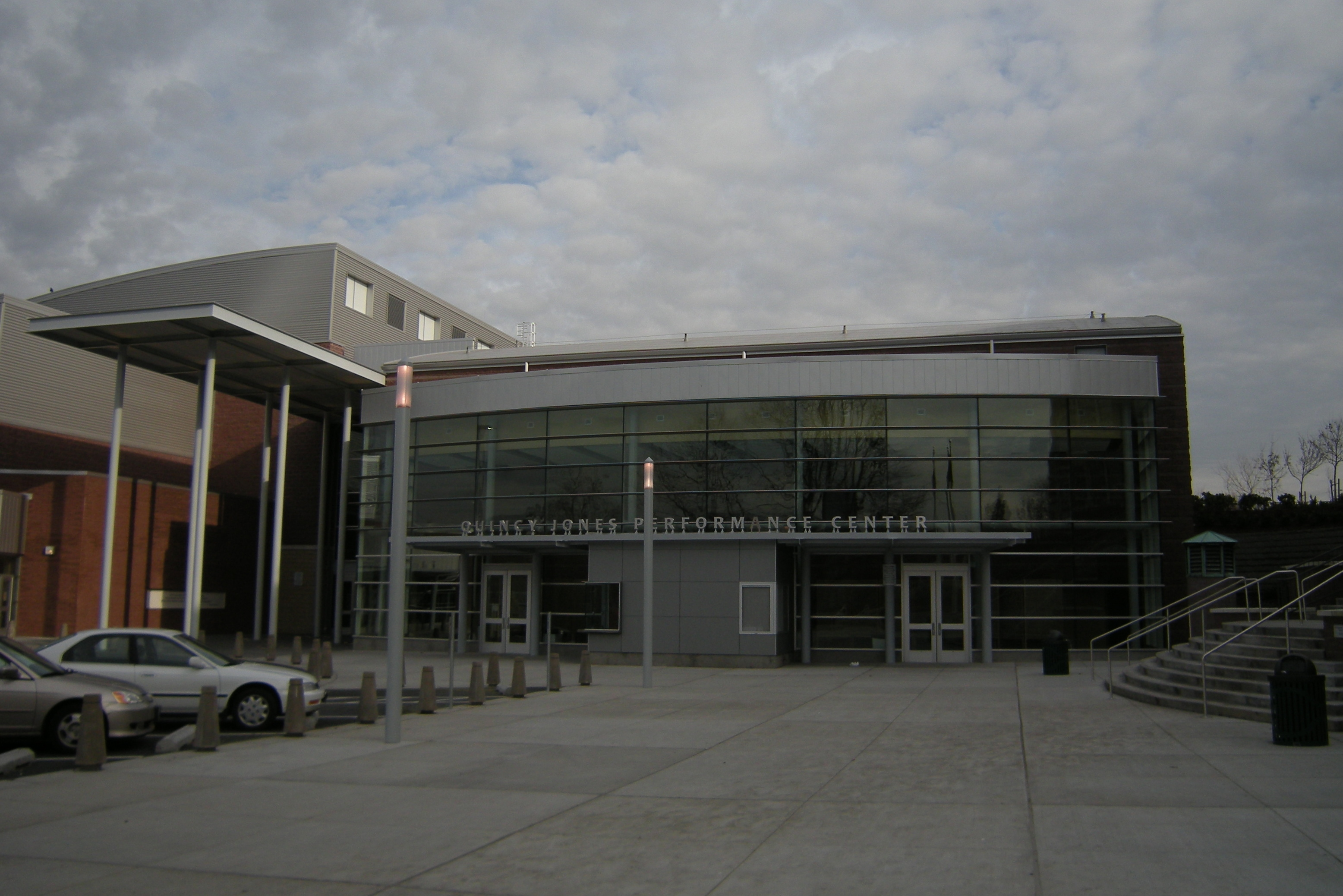
The Quincy Jones Performance Center at the high school

The music program at Garfield High School has won numerous awards. Several notable musicians attended the school, including Jimi Hendrix, Lil Tracy, Quincy Jones, Macklemore, and Ernestine Anderson.

=== Vocal department ===
The choirs at Garfield include a Treble Choir, Concert Choir and a Vocal Jazz group. In 2009, the vocal jazz ensemble received a special commendation for its performance at Lionel Hampton. In 2024, they took home a trophy, winning the Sweepstakes competition.

=== Orchestra ===
The orchestra program includes a symphony orchestra, a concert orchestra, and a chamber music program. Every year, many students from the orchestra play in the Seattle Youth Symphony Orchestras, often in principal positions. Garfield students also play in the Seattle Conservatory of Music Starling Scholar Chamber Orchestra, and many community ensembles. Garfield orchestra members have had their original compositions debuted by the Seattle Symphony and SYSO.

In 1995, Garfield guest conductor Gerard Schwarz, music director of the Seattle Symphony, said, "I don’t recall hearing a high school orchestra perform anywhere in this country on such a high level." Garfield has won numerous first-place awards in festivals around the world, including the Best Orchestra for Downbeat Magazine in both 1999 and 2007, and the National Orchestra Cup in 2011. The Garfield Symphony Orchestra has also toured and performed in Japan, Europe, Boston, Chicago, Los Angeles, and Carnegie Hall and Alice Tully Hall in New York.

=== Jazz Band ===
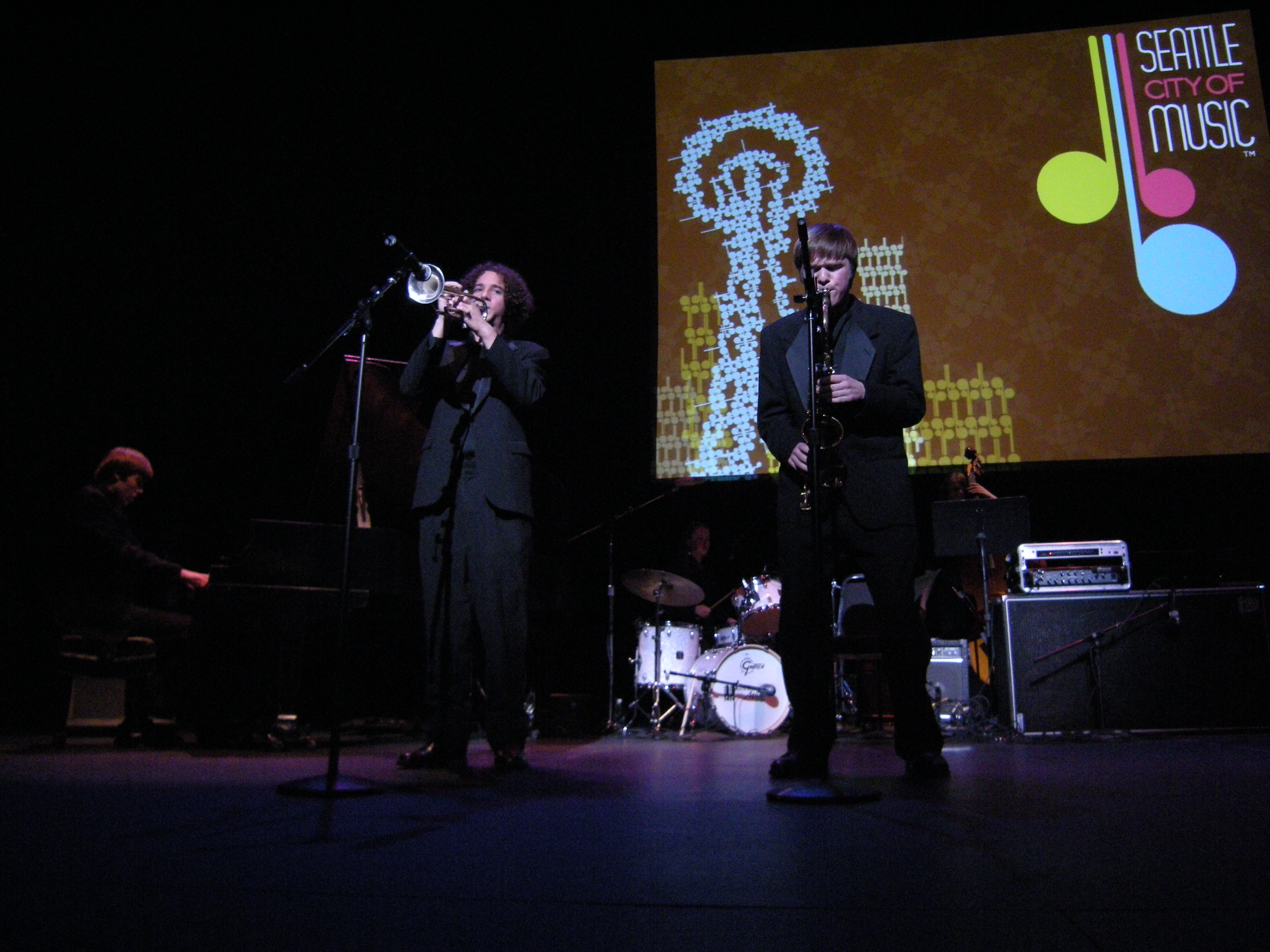
Garfield High School jazz quintet at Paramount Theatre in Seattle in 2008

Garfield's jazz program has won state, national and international awards and accolades in big band, combo and individual categories. Jazz Ensemble I has toured Europe numerous times, visiting the Netherlands, France, Switzerland, Germany, Belgium, Austria, Italy, and playing at venues including the Montreux and North Sea Jazz Festivals. It has also attended the International Association of Jazz Educators' conference, as well as the Essentially Ellington Competition in New York City. It is the only band to win the first-place trophy in consecutive years (2003–04 and 2009–10) and the only band to have been invited to Essentially Ellington for ten consecutive years. Overall showings at Essentially Ellington have included 1999 (honorable mention), 2000 (honorable mention), 2002 (2nd place), 2003 (1st place), 2004 (1st place), 2006 (3rd place), 2008 (2nd place), 2009 (1st place), 2010 (1st place). The band was a finalist 2013–16, 2019–20, and 2022–24. Its consistent placement in national competitions and long history of national recognition indicate its status as one of the best high school jazz bands in the country.

Among the many other awards are seven sweepstakes wins since 2000 at the Clark College Jazz Festival in Vancouver, Washington, three sweepstakes wins (including two by Jazz Band II) at the Bellevue High School jazz festival in Bellevue, Washington, six sweepstakes awards at the Lionel Hampton Jazz Festival in Moscow, Idaho, and others wins at the Reno and Mount Hood jazz festivals.

== School Shooting ==
A 17-year-old student was shot and killed in front of the school on June 6, 2024, prompting increased security measures.

== Notable alumni ==
- Ernestine Anderson, jazz and blues singer
- Debbie Armstrong, alpine ski racer and Olympic gold medalist
- David Baker, biochemist and 2024 Nobel Prize in Chemistry laureate
- Fred Bassetti, architect
- Jack Benaroya, real-estate mogul and philanthropist
- Derrick Brown, DJ, record producer and songwriter known as Vitamin D
- Terrell Brown Jr., basketball player for the Greensboro Swarm
- Ishmael Butler, former College Basketball Player (UMASS) and Grammy award-winning musician with Digable Planets and Shabazz Palaces
- Linda Lee Cadwell, author and widow of martial arts master and actor Bruce Lee
- Irwin Caplan, creator of the cartoon Famous Last Words
- Deandre Coleman, NFL player for the Buffalo Bills
- Will Conroy, NBA and NBADL player
- Peter DePoe, drummer, Redbone
- Michael B. Druxman, screenwriter, playwright, biographer, film director
- Emma Dumont, actress
- Tari Eason, NBA player
- Gisele Fox, high fashion model
- Frank E. Garretson, Brigadier general, U.S. Marine Corps
- Bruce Harrell, mayor of Seattle
- Tre'Shaun Harrison, NFL wide receiver for the Tennessee Titans
- Jeff Heath, former MLB player (Cleveland Indians, Washington Senators, St. Louis Browns, Boston Braves)
- Richard Hedreen, hotelier
- Jimi Hendrix, rock musician (attended but did not graduate)
- Steven Hill, actor (attended as Solomon "Sol" Krakovsky)
- Michael Hobbes, journalist and podcast host
- Bill Hosokawa, author and journalist
- B. J. Johnson, swimmer
- Lyndell Jones, former NFL cornerback
- Quincy Jones, music producer
- Shirley Kaufman, poet
- Aaron Kovar, professional footballer for the Los Angeles FC
- Aki Kurose, activist; completed high school in Minidoka Internment Camp
- Leah LaBelle, singer
- Dave Lewis, rock musician
- Peter Scott Lewis, composer
- Miko Lim, fashion photographer
- Macklemore (Ben Haggerty), Seattle hip hop artist
- Mary McCarthy, novelist and critic
- Ari Melber, journalist, chief legal correspondent for MSNBC
- William K. Nakamura, World War II Medal of Honor recipient
- Billy North, former MLB player (Chicago Cubs, Oakland Athletics, Los Angeles Dodgers, San Francisco Giants)
- Jaylen Nowell, NBA Player
- Frank Okada, painter
- Kassa Overall, jazz and hip-hop artist
- Marjorie Pitter King, first African-American woman to serve in the Washington State Legislature
- Robert Prince, planner of successful Raid at Cabanatuan that freed 500+ WWII prisoners
- Henry Prusoff (1912–1943), tennis player
- Irvine Robbins, co-founder of the Baskin-Robbins ice cream parlor chain
- Brandon Roy, former NBA Rookie of the Year and All-Star for the Portland Trail Blazers and Minnesota Timberwolves
- Omari Salisbury, journalist, videographer, and founder of Converge Media
- Yasser Seirawan, chess grandmaster
- Lynn Shelton, film director and writer
- Roger Shimomura, sansei artist
- Tre Simmons, professional basketball player and coach
- Doug Smart, college basketball player
- Isaiah Stanback, NFL player
- Jaylin Stewart, college basketball player
- Lil Tracy, American rapper, singer, and songwriter
- Joyce Walker, third woman to join the Harlem Globetrotters
- Lindy West, feminist and journalist
- Eric Wilkins, former professional player, Cleveland Indians
- Tony Wroten, NBA player
- Minoru Yamasaki, architect of the former World Trade Center
