= Metro League (Seattle) =

High school athletics conference

The Metro League is a high school athletics conference in Seattle, Washington, part of the Washington Interscholastic Activities Association (WIAA). Its 18 members are in SeaKing District II, which includes Seattle and east King County.

== History ==
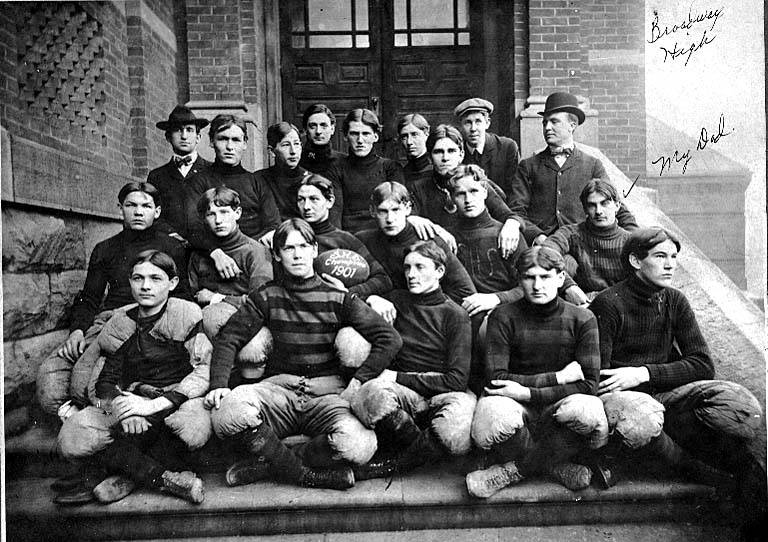
1901 Broadway football team

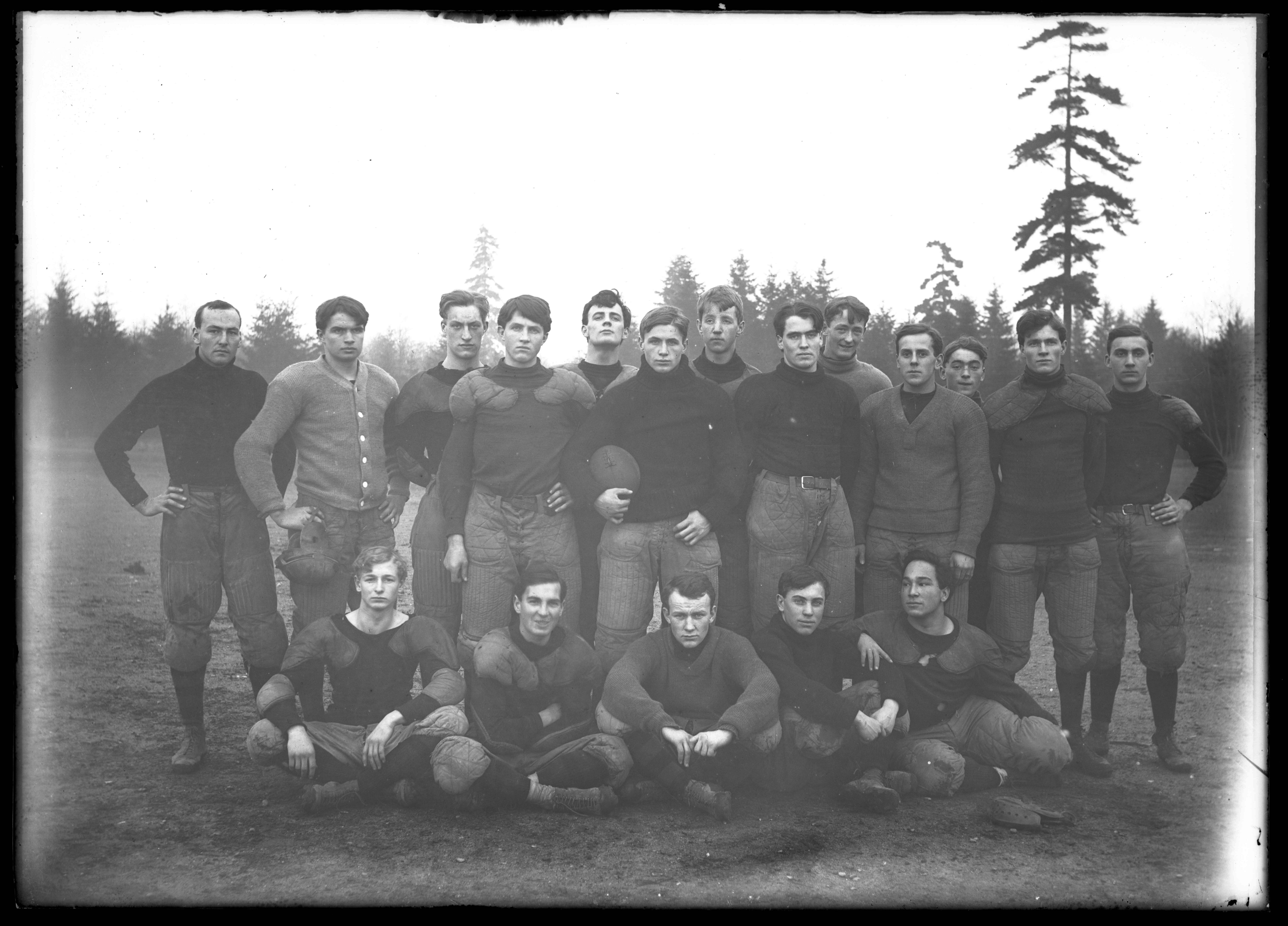
1908 Lincoln football team

High school athletics in Seattle dates back to the end of the 19th century. The Seattle Times published a news article in 1897 documenting the formation of a football team for Seattle High School, later renamed Broadway High School

The Metro League was founded as the athletic conference for Seattle Public Schools in 1912 and called the City League. The five founding schools were Ballard, Broadway, Franklin, Lincoln, and West Seattle. As the city grew more public high schools opened and joined the City League. These early additions include Garfield in 1920, Roosevelt in 1922, and Cleveland in 1927. No new members would join the league for the next 30-years. In 1946 Broadway high school would leave the league after Seattle Public Schools closed the school. The next addition to the league came in 1957 when Chief Sealth opened. Two years later Ingraham would open in 1959.

Metro League schools were prohibited from competing in the early state meet competitions by Seattle Public Schools administrators. The first WIAA state meet in boys basketball was in 1923 but it wasn't until 1945 that the Metro League allowed its schools to compete. Lincoln defeated Bellingham High School 50-38 to win the state championship that year. The first state meet in boys track and field took place in 1924 but it wasn't until 1959 that Metro League schools were allowed to compete.

In 1960 the league changed names and became known as the Metro League. The same year Edmonds High School and Shoreline High School both joined the league. This was the first-time schools not in the Seattle Public School district joined the league. Other schools from outside Seattle to join during this time were Mountlake Terrace High School and Shorecrest High School which joined in 1961 and 1963 respectively. New Seattle Public Schools to join during this time were Rainier Beach in 1960 and Nathan Hale in 1963. Edmonds and Mountlake Terrace, both of the Edmonds School District, left the Metro League in 1965 to join the Wesco League.

The mid 1970s to the early 1980s saw a lot of change to the Metro League. The most impactful change was the addition of private schools to the league. Private schools in Seattle had fielded athletic teams for decades but were previously in different athletic leagues than the public schools. This changed in the 1970's as Bishop Blanchet, Holy Names, Lakeside, O'Dea, and Seattle Prep all joined the Metro League. During this time Shorewood High School of the Shoreline School District would open in 1975 and also join the league. Four years later in 1979 all three Shoreline high schools, (Shorecrest, Shoreline, and Shorewood), would leave the league and join the Wesco League. Two years later in 1981 both Lincoln and Queen Anne high schools would leave the league after Seattle Public Schools closed both schools due to declining enrollment.

Further additions to the Metro League include the private school Eastside Catholic in 1989 and Bainbridge Island in 2001. Bainbridge Island would later leave the league in 2020. Lincoln would rejoin the Metro League in 2019 after Seattle Public Schools reopened the school. In the 2024-2025 school year, Seattle Academy of Arts and Sciences (SAAS) joined the Metro League becoming the first new school to join the league since 2001.

The mid 1990's saw classification changes affect the Metro League. At the end of the 1994-95 school year, Franklin, Garfield, and Roosevelt left Class AA to form a three-team Class AAA Metro League. The football teams for all three schools played in the Olympic League of Kitsap and Clallam counties. Starting in the 1997-98 school year, Franklin, Garfield, and Roosevelt all left the Metro League to join the KingCo 4A Conference. In the 2002-03 school year Ballard would also leave the Metro League and join the KingCo 4A Conference. In the 2008-09 school year Franklin would move back to the Metro League after dropping from 4A to 3A. Ballard, Franklin, and Garfield would all return to the Metro League in the 2014-15 school year when all three schools dropped down from the 4A to 3A classification.

The Metro League football champion was awarded the Leon Brigham Trophy, originally donated by Royal Brougham.

== Current members ==
Membership as of the 2024–25 school year

School	Location	Founded	Joined	Type	Division	2024-25 Enrollment	Mascot	Colors
Ballard	Seattle, WA	1903	1912	Public	3A	1,705	Beavers	
Bishop Blanchet	Seattle, WA	1954	1975	Private	3A	930	Bears	
Chief Sealth	Seattle, WA	1957	1957	Public	2A	1,186	Seahawks	
Cleveland	Seattle, WA	1927	1927	Public	2A	877	Eagles	
Eastside Catholic	Sammamish, WA	1980	1989	Private	3A	602	Crusaders	
Franklin	Seattle, WA	1912	1912	Public	3A	1,281	Quakers	
Garfield	Seattle, WA	1920	1920	Public	3A	1,509	Bulldogs	
Holy Names†	Seattle, WA	1880	1975	Private	3A	572	Cougars	
Ingraham	Seattle, WA	1959	1959	Public	3A	1,397	Rams	
Lakeside	Seattle, WA	1919	1977	Private	3A	587	Lions	
Lincoln*	Seattle, WA	1907	1912	Public	4A	1,780	Lynx	
Nathan Hale	Seattle, WA	1963	1963	Public	2A	1,059	Raiders	
O'Dea‡	Seattle, WA	1923	1977	Private	3A	480	Fighting Irish	
Rainier Beach	Seattle, WA	1960	1960	Public	3A	854	Vikings	
Roosevelt	Seattle, WA	1922	1922	Public	3A	1,561	Rough Riders	
Seattle Academy	Seattle, WA	1983	2024	Private	3A	845	Cardinals	
Seattle Prep	Seattle, WA	1891	1975	Private	3A	800	Panthers	
West Seattle	Seattle, WA	1902	1912	Public	3A	1,487	Wildcats	

* Lincoln High School closed in 1981 due to declining enrollment but reopened in the fall of 2019.

† All girls school ‡ All boys school

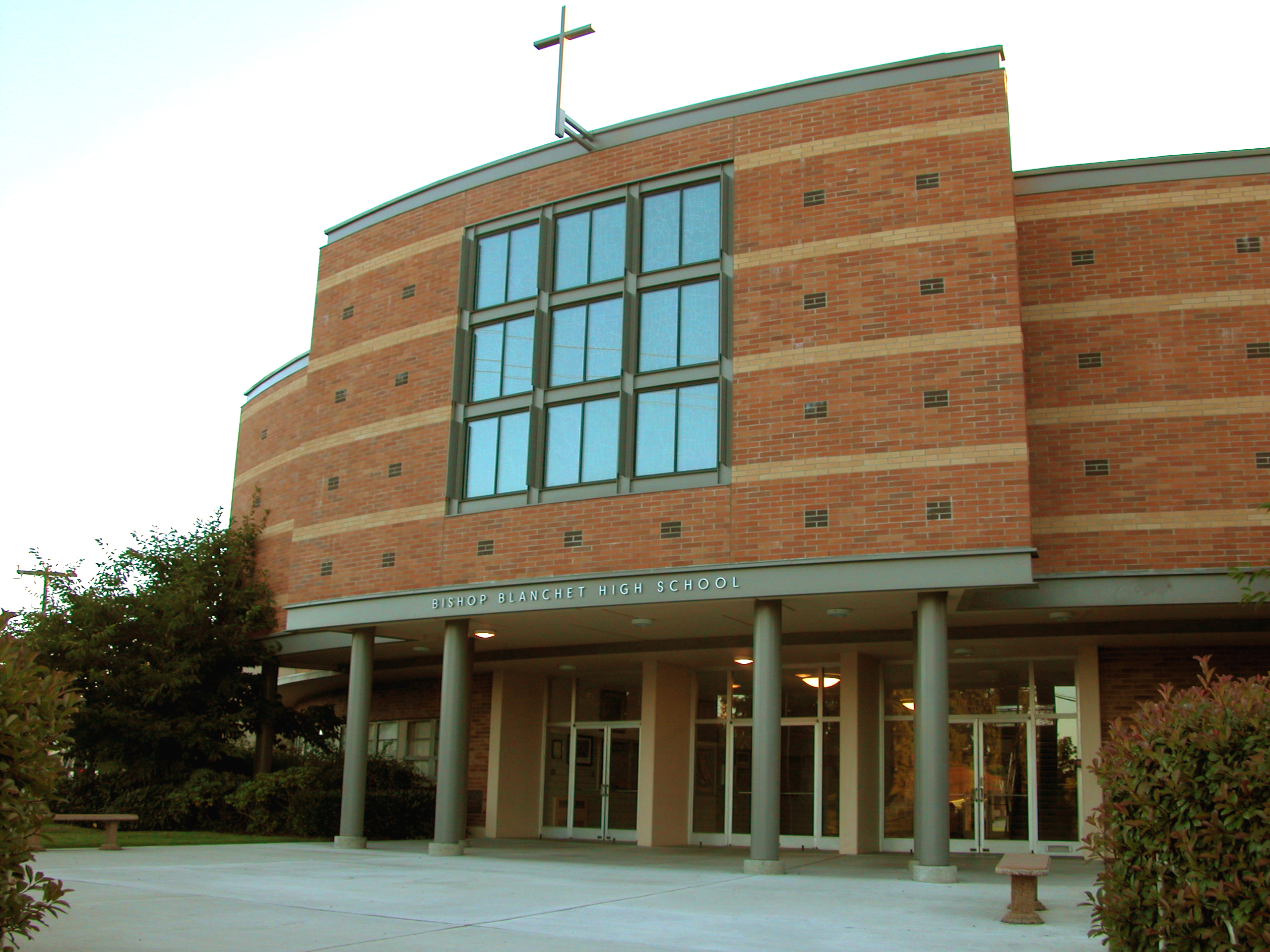
Blanchet High School

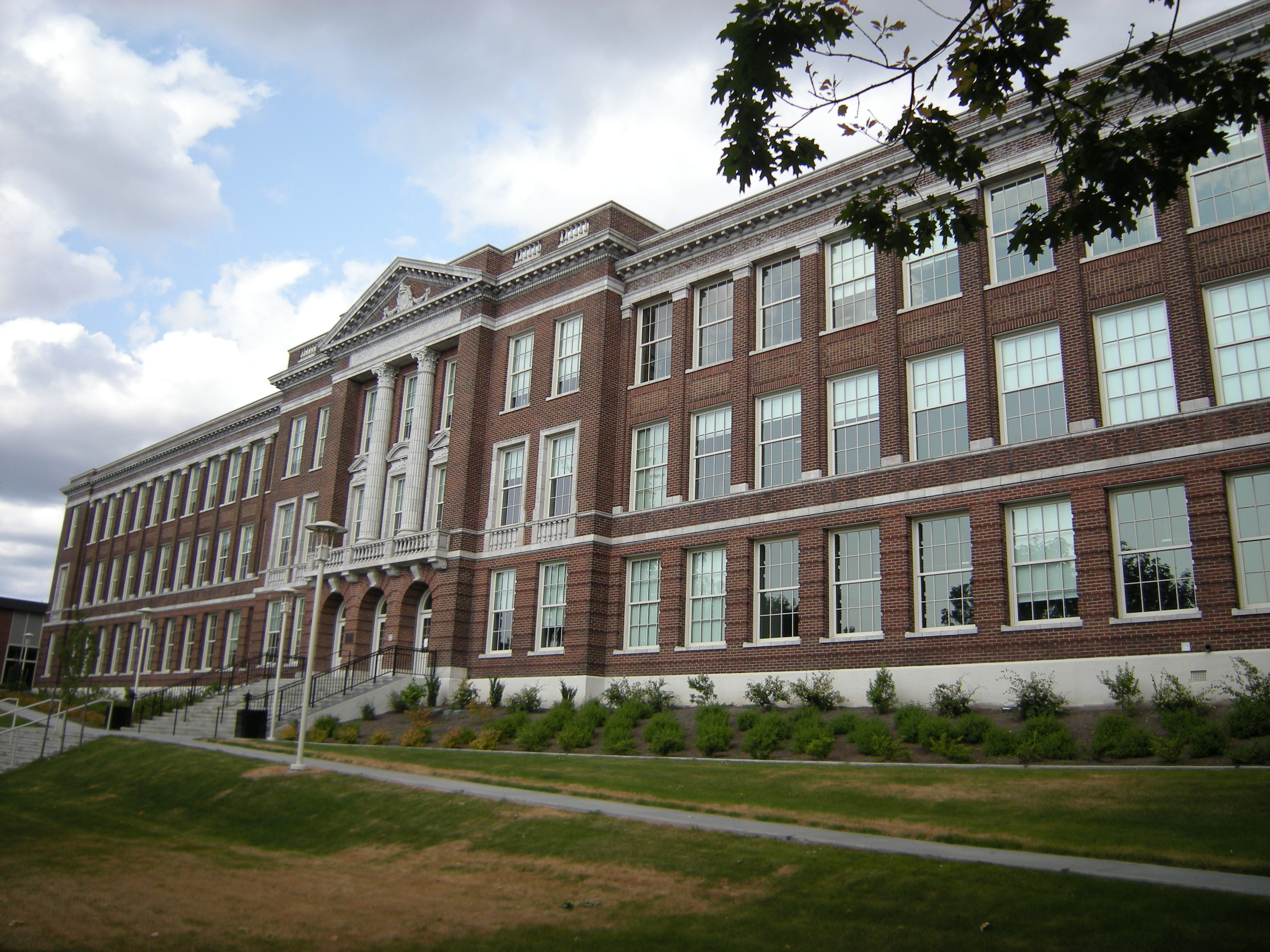
Cleveland High School

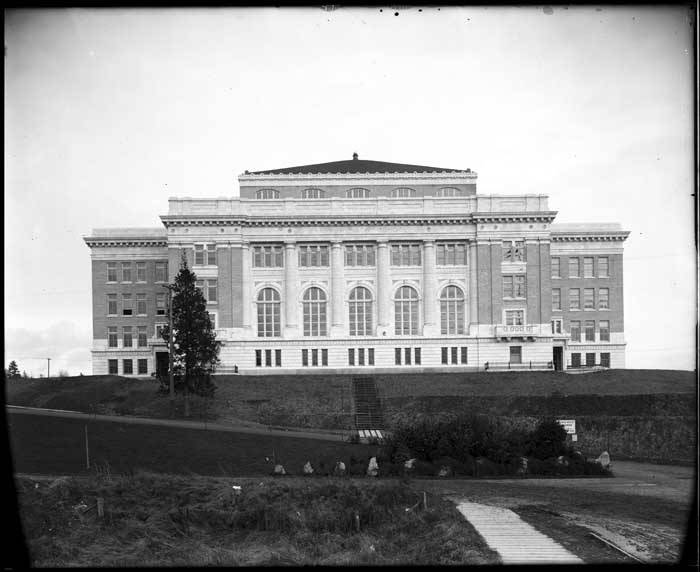
Franklin High School

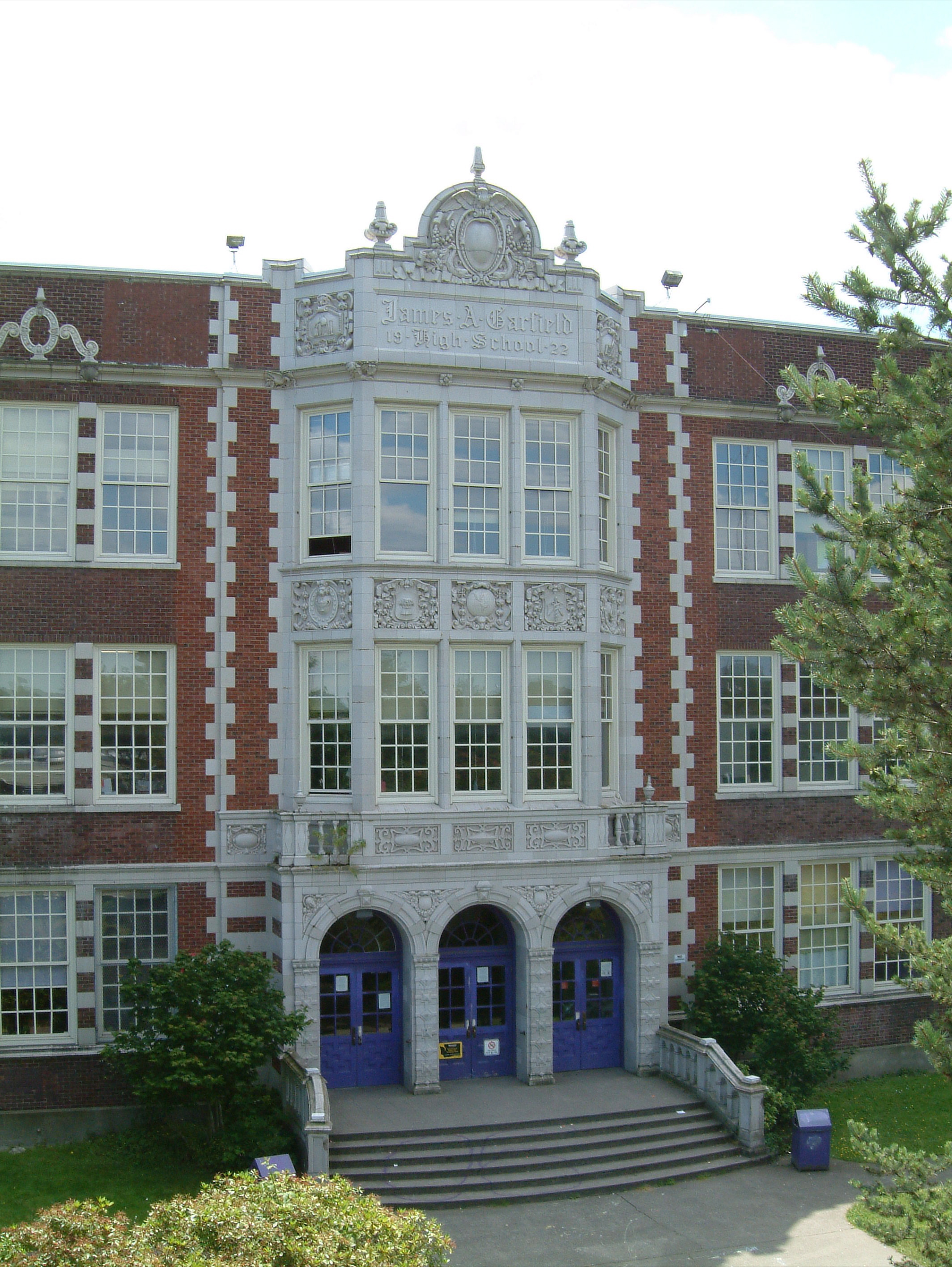
Garfield High School

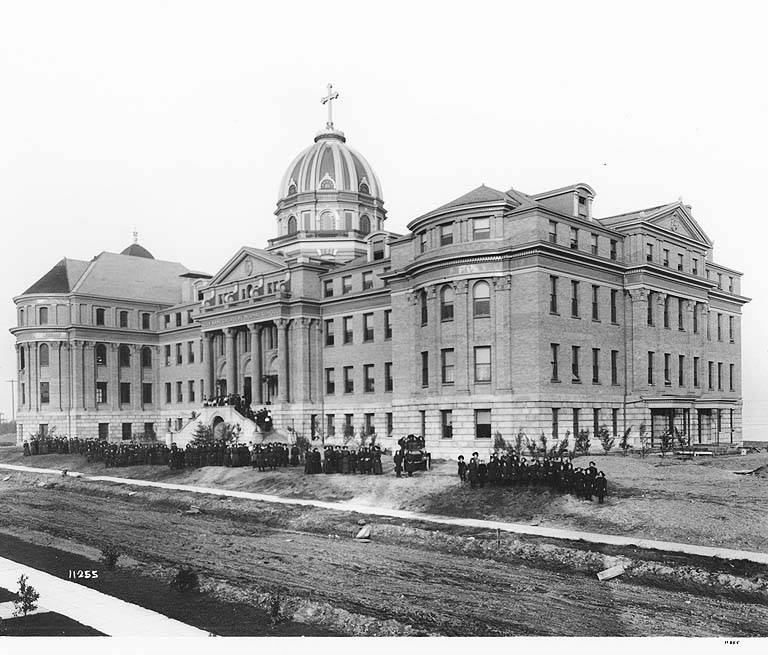
Holy Names Academy
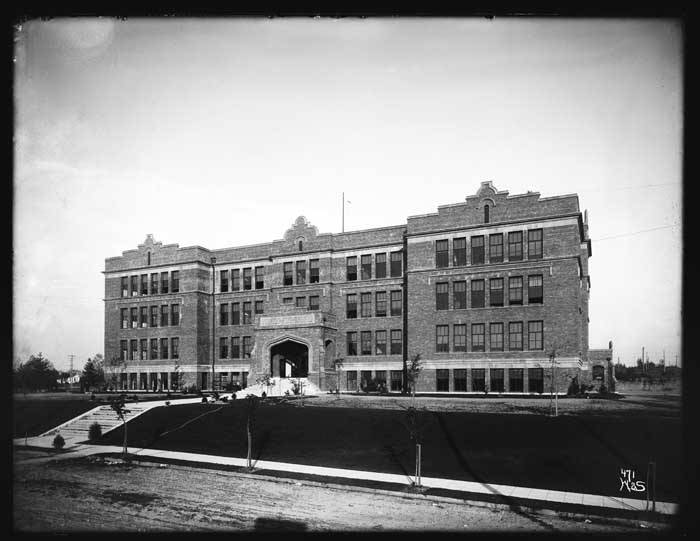
Lincoln High School

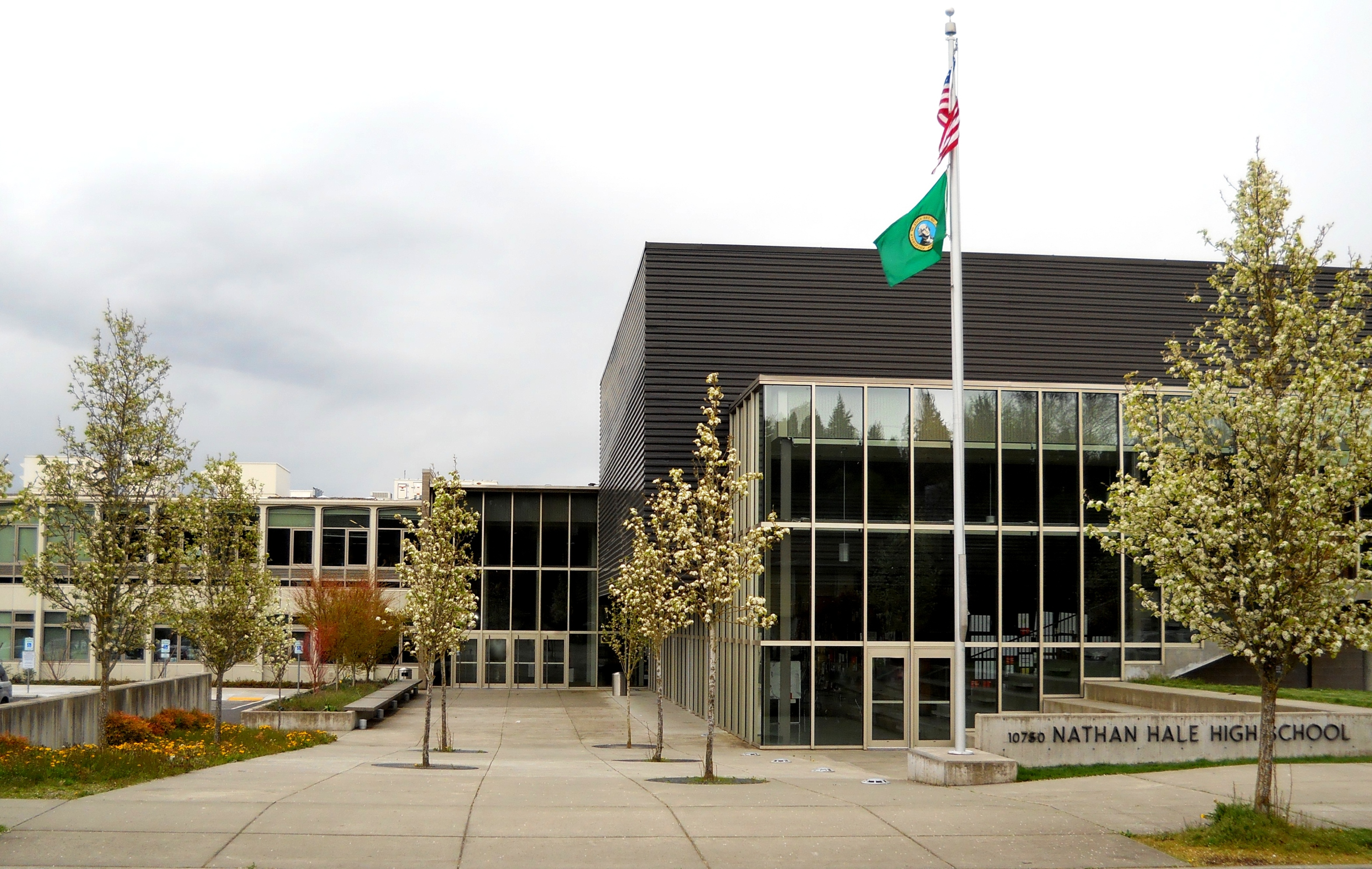
Nathan Hale High School

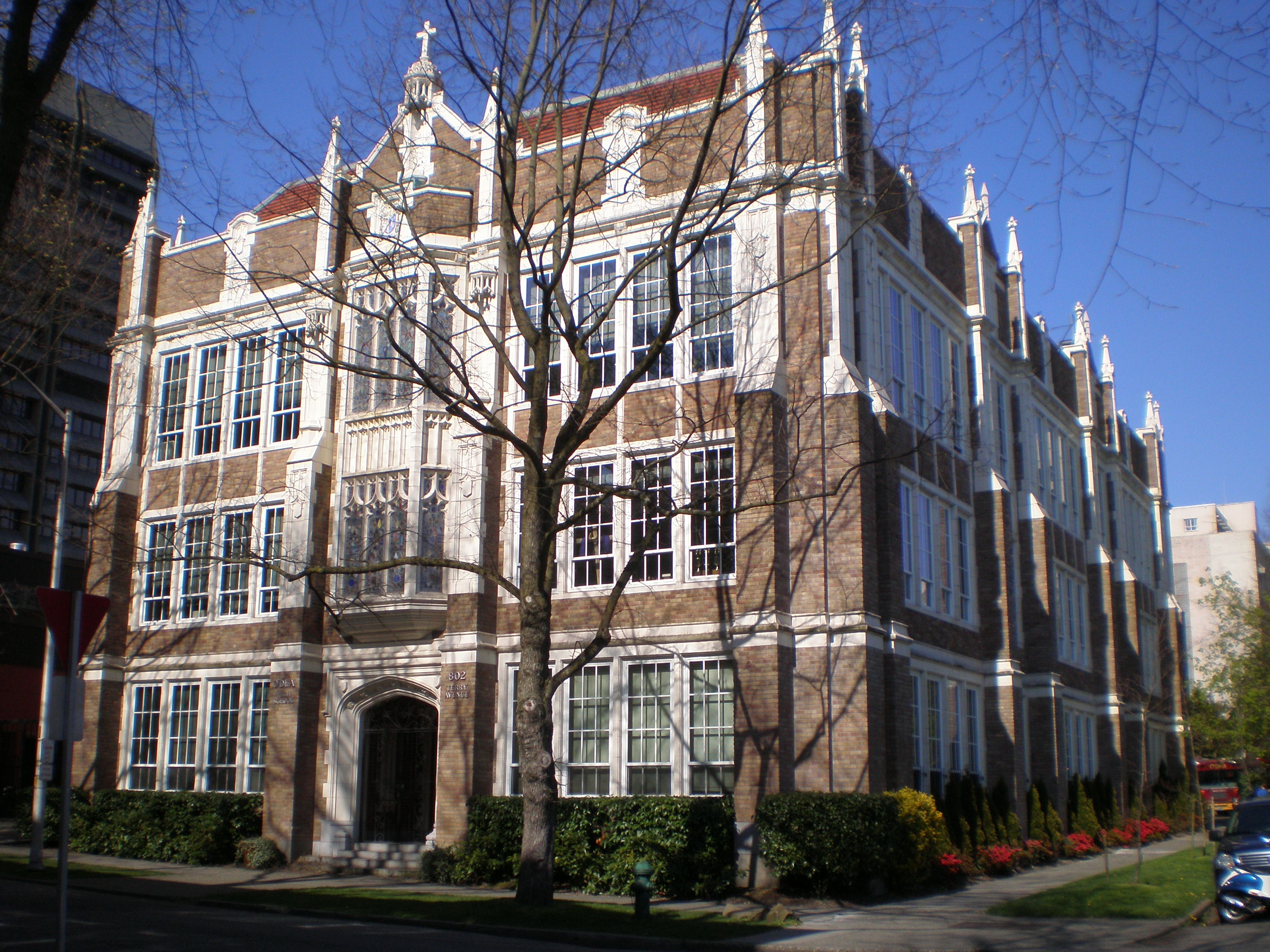
O'Dea High School

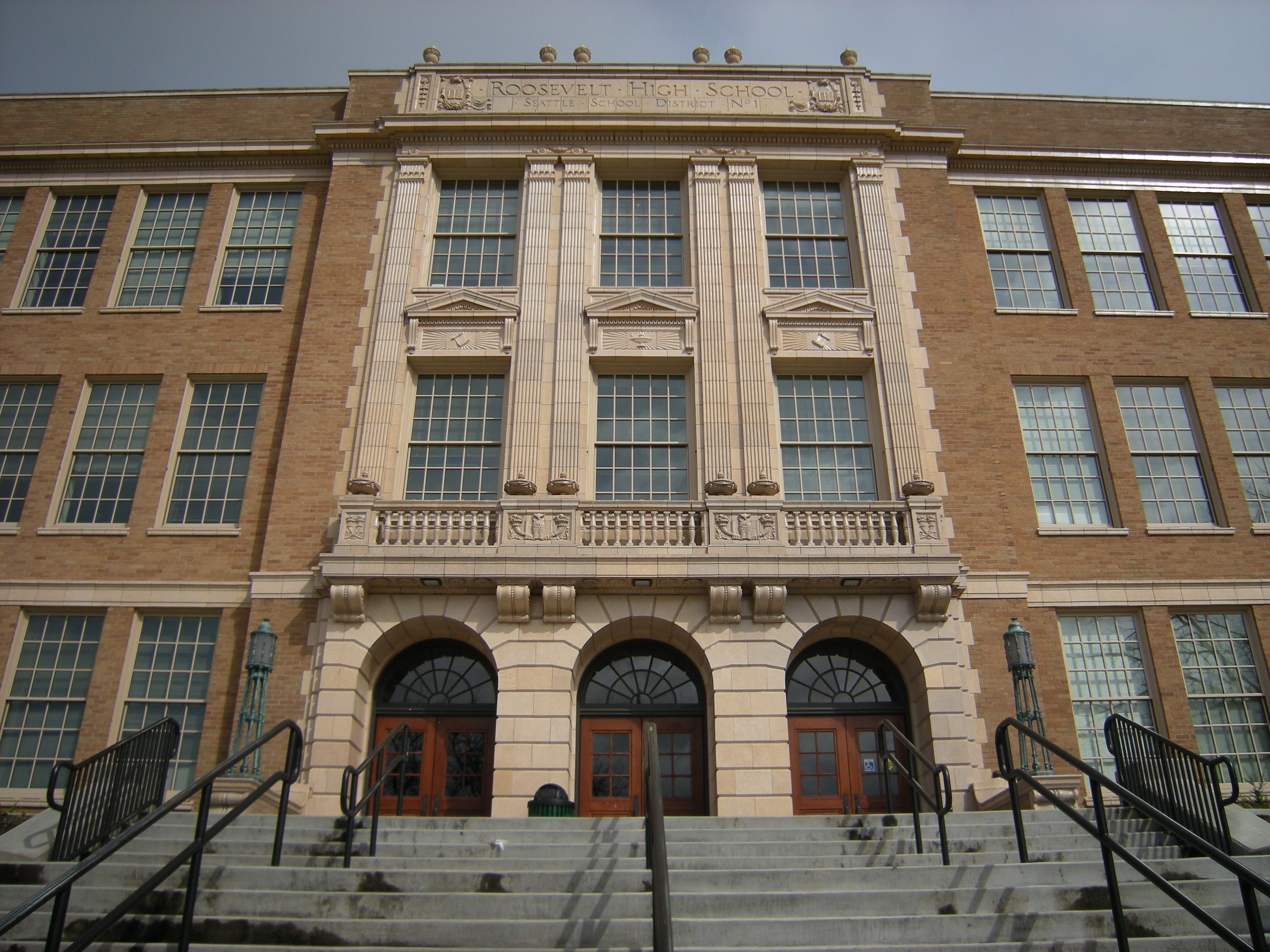
Roosevelt High School

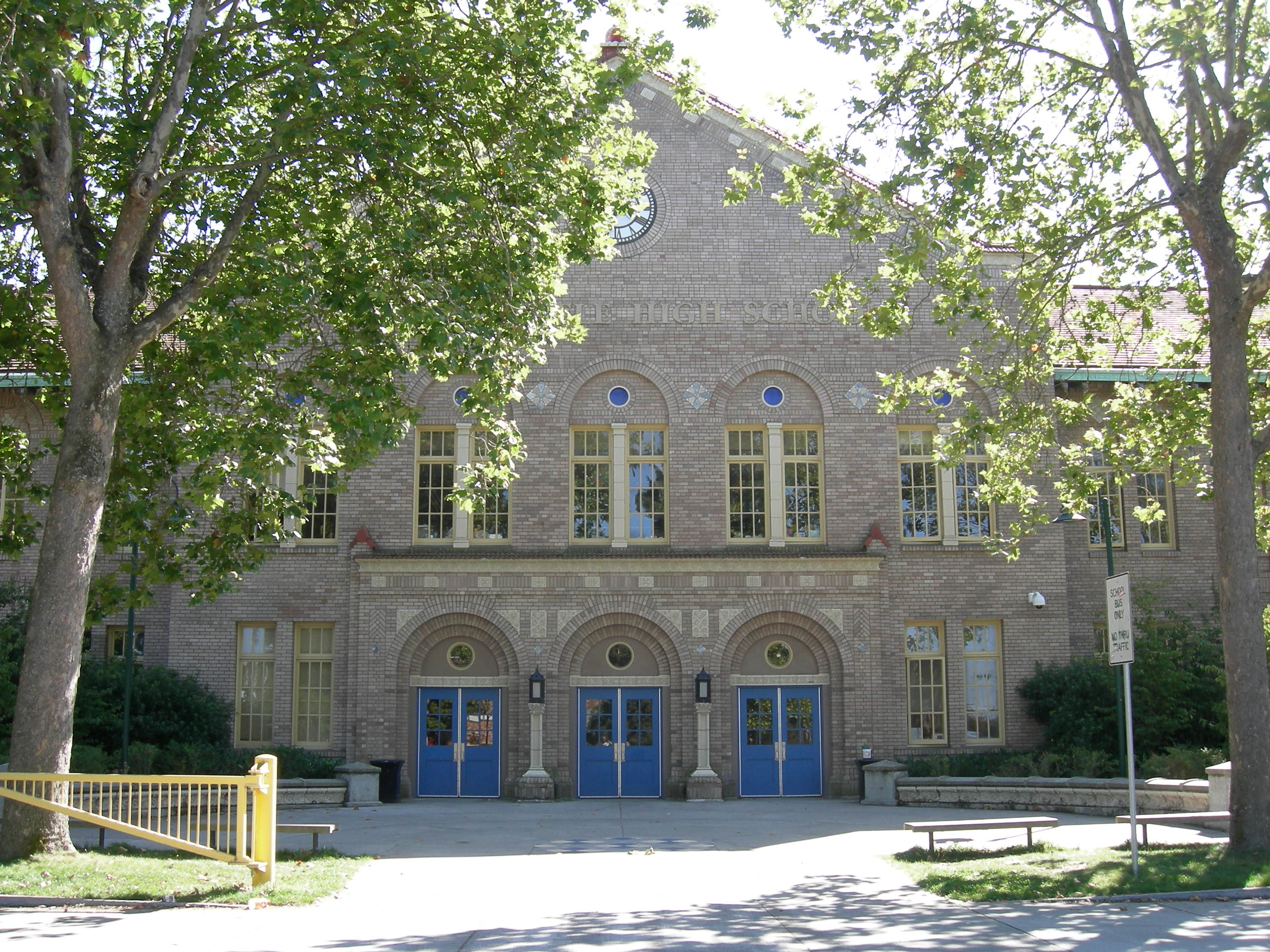
West Seattle High School

== Former members ==
School	Location	Founded	Joined	Left	Type	Mascot	Colors
Bainbridge	Bainbridge Island, WA	1928	2001	2020	Public	Spartans	
Broadway	Seattle, WA	1902	1912	1946	Public	Tigers	
Edmonds	Edmonds, WA	1909	1960	1965	Public	Tigers	
Mountlake Terrace	Mountlake Terrace, WA	1960	1961	1965	Public	Hawks	
Queen Anne	Seattle, WA	1909	1912	1981	Public	Grizzlies	
Shorecrest	Shoreline, WA	1961	1963	1979	Public	Highlanders	
Shoreline	Shoreline, WA	1955	1960	1979	Public	Spartans	
Shorewood	Shoreline, WA	1975	1975	1979	Public	Thunderbirds	

=== Membership timeline ===
Public School Private School

== Sports ==
The following are WIAA sanctioned sports that the Metro League offers.

Boys sports

- Baseball
- Basketball
- Cross Country
- Football
- Golf
- Soccer
- Swim\Dive
- Tennis
- Track and Field
- Wrestling

Girls sports

- Basketball
- Bowling
- Cross Country
- Fastpitch Softball
- Flag Football
- Golf
- Gymnastics
- Slowpitch Softball
- Soccer
- Swim\Dive
- Tennis
- Track and Field
- Volleyball
- Wrestling

In addition to the WIAA sanctioned sports many Metro League schools have multiple club sports such as crew, lacrosse, and ultimate frisbee.

== State championships ==
The Metro League has produced many state championship teams throughout its history. Boys basketball has been the most successful with the metro league winning over 50 state titles since the league was allowed to participate in the state tournament in 1945.

The following list of state championship teams includes all current members. Titles won by former members are included as well but only for the years when the school was a member of the Metro League. Schools that are italicized are current members but were not when the state title was won.

=== Boys' team state championships ===
Baseball

Year	School	Class
2024	West Seattle	3A
2023	Lincoln	3A
2014	O'Dea	3A
2010	O'Dea	3A
2009	O'Dea	3A
2005	O'Dea	3A
1996	Blanchet	3A
1975	Shorecrest	3A

Basketball

Year	School	Class
2025	Rainier Beach	3A
2024	Eastside Catholic	3A
2023	Garfield	3A
2020	Garfield	3A
2019	O'Dea	3A
2018	Garfield	3A
2017	Nathan Hale	3A
2016	Rainier Beach	3A
2015	Garfield	3A
2014	Garfield	4A
2014	Rainier Beach	3A
2013	Rainier Beach	3A
2012	Rainier Beach	3A
2009	Franklin	3A
2008	Rainier Beach	3A
2007	O'Dea	3A
2006	Franklin	4A
2006	Seattle Prep	3A
2005	O'Dea	3A
2004	O'Dea	3A
2003	Franklin	4A
2003	Rainier Beach	3A
2002	Rainier Beach	3A
2000	Seattle Prep	3A
1998	Garfield	4A
1998	Rainier Beach	3A
1997	O'Dea	3A
1995	Franklin	3A
1994	Franklin	3A
1993	O'Dea	3A
1991	Garfield	4A
1989	Chief Sealth	3A
1988	Rainier Beach	3A
1987	Garfield	4A
1986	Garfield	4A
1983	Garfield	4A
1982	Roosevelt	4A
1980	Garfield	4A
1978	Garfield	4A
1976	Cleveland	4A
1975	Cleveland	4A
1974	Garfield	4A
1973	Roosevelt	4A
1969	Ingraham	4A
1963	Blanchet	4A
1962	Garfield	4A
1961	Garfield	4A
1957	Lincoln	4A
1956	Lincoln	4A
1955	Garfield	4A
1954	Franklin	4A
1946	Roosevelt	4A
1945	Lincoln	4A

Cross Country

Year	School	Class
2023	Seattle Prep	3A
2022	Seattle Prep	3A
2021	Blanchet	3A
2004	Blanchet	3A
2002	Blanchet	3A
2001	Blanchet	3A
2000	Seattle Prep	3A
1999	Lakeside	3A
1992	Blanchet	3A
1991	Blanchet	3A
1986	Blanchet	4A
1984	Blanchet	4A
1983	Blanchet	4A
1980	Lakeside	3A
1972	Seattle Prep	2A
1967	Franklin	4A
1966	Nathan Hale	4A
1966	Seattle Prep	2A
1964	Franklin	4A

Football

Year	School	Class
2025	O'Dea	3A
2024	O'Dea	3A
2019	Eastside Catholic	3A
2018	Eastside Catholic	3A
2017	O'Dea	3A
2015	Eastside Catholic	3A
2014	Eastside Catholic	3A
1995	O'Dea	3A
1994	O'Dea	3A
1991	O'Dea	3A
1988	Ingraham	4A
1974	Blanchet	4A

Golf

Year	School	Class
2016	Roosevelt	3A
2015	Bainbridge	3A
2011	Seattle Prep	3A
2008	O'Dea	3A
2005	Bainbridge	3A
2002	Lakeside	3A
2000	Lakeside	3A
1995	Seattle Prep	3A
1986	Lakeside	3A
1972	Ingraham	4A
1964	Shoreline	4A
1963	Shoreline	4A

Gymnastics (Defunct Sport)

Year	School	Class
1971	West Seattle	4A
1970	Nathan Hale	4A

Soccer

Year	School	Class
2023	Lincoln	3A
2019	Lakeside	3A
2018	Garfield	3A
2017	Roosevelt	3A
2014	Lakeside	3A
2012	Bainbridge	3A
1990	O'Dea	3A
1985	Nathan Hale	3A
1980	Blanchet	4A
1978	Shorewood	4A
1976	Shorecrest	4A
1974	Blanchet	4A

Swimming

Year	School	Class
2024	Lakeside	3A
2019	Bainbridge	3A
2018	Bainbridge	3A
2013	Lakeside	3A
2012	Lakeside	3A
1996	Seattle Prep	3A

Tennis

Year	School	Class
2022	Lakeside	3A
2019	Lakeside	3A
2010	Seattle Prep	3A
2009	Seattle Prep	3A
2005	Lakeside	3A
2004	Lakeside	3A
2003	Lakeside	3A
2002	Seattle Prep	3A
2001	Seattle Prep	3A
1998	Seattle Prep	3A
1997	Seattle Prep	3A
1996	Seattle Prep	3A
1995	Seattle Prep	3A
1994	Lakeside	3A
1991	Seattle Prep	3A
1986	Lakeside	3A
1985	Lakeside	3A
1976	Lakeside	3A
1971	Lakeside	4A
1964	Seattle Prep	4A
1963	Seattle Prep	4A
1962	Seattle Prep	4A
1960	Seattle Prep	4A

Track & Field

Year	School	Class
2004	O'Dea	3A
2003	O'Dea	3A
1995	O'Dea	3A
1989	Garfield	4A
1988	Garfield	4A
1987	Rainier Beach	3A
1986	Garfield	4A
1986	Rainier Beach	3A
1985	Garfield	4A
1984	Garfield	4A
1980	Franklin	3A
1979	Garfield	4A
1967	Franklin	4A
1965	Ingraham	4A
1948	Lakeside	4A

=== Girls' team state championships ===
Basketball

Year	School	Class
2024	Garfield	3A
2023	Garfield	3A
2022	Garfield	3A
2020	Garfield	3A
2014	Cleveland	3A
2013	Cleveland	3A
2011	Holy Names	3A
2010	Cleveland	3A
2005	Roosevelt	4A
2004	Roosevelt	4A
2003	Lakeside	3A
2002	Seattle Prep	3A
1996	Blanchet	3A
1995	Blanchet	3A
1994	Lakeside	3A
1992	Lakeside	3A
1990	Lakeside	3A
1989	Lakeside	3A
1987	Garfield	4A
1980	Garfield	4A

Cross Country

Year	School	Class
2016	Holy Names	3A
2014	Holy Names	3A
1991	Lakeside	3A
1984	Eastside Catholic	4A
1982	Lakeside	3A
1975	Chief Sealth	4A
1973	Shoreline	4A

Golf

Year	School	Class
2010	Holy Names	3A
2009	Holy Names	3A
2001	Holy Names	3A

Gymnastics

Year	School	Class
2025	Ballard	3A
2019	Holy Names	3A
2018	Holy Names	3A
2017	Holy Names	3A
2005	Bainbridge	3A

Soccer

Year	School	Class
2024	Seattle Prep	3A
2023	Roosevelt	3A
2021	Lakeside	3A
2015	Seattle Prep	3A
2011	Seattle Prep	3A
2010	Seattle Prep	3A
2003	Lakeside	3A
2000	Lakeside	3A
1999	Holy Names	3A
1998	Lakeside	3A
1996	Lakeside	3A
1995	Lakeside	3A

Softball

Year	School	Class
2019	Garfield	3A
2009	Bainbridge	3A
1980	Blanchet	4A

Swimming & Diving

Year	School	Class
2016	Lakeside	3A
2015	Lakeside	3A
2014	Lakeside	3A

Tennis

Year	School	Class
2022	Lakeside	3A
2017	Holy Names	3A
2014	Garfield	4A
1998	Franklin	4A
1997	Seattle Prep	3A
1996	Seattle Prep	3A
1994	Lakeside	3A
1993	Seattle Prep	3A
1992	Lakeside	3A
1991	Lakeside	3A
1990	Lakeside	3A
1988	Lakeside	3A
1987	Lakeside	3A

Track & Field

Year	School	Class
2017	Garfield	3A
2011	Holy Names	3A
2009	Rainier Beach	3A
2005	Holy Names	3A
2004	Rainier Beach	3A
2001	Rainier Beach	3A
2000	Holy Names	3A
1999	Holy Names	3A
1998	Holy Names	3A
1997	Garfield	4A
1996	Lakeside	3A
1993	Garfield	3A
1992	Lakeside	3A
1991	Lakeside	3A
1989	Cleveland	3A
1988	Rainier Beach	3A
1987	Garfield	4A
1986	Rainier Beach	3A
1985	Garfield	4A
1985	Rainier Beach	3A
1984	Garfield	4A
1984	Rainier Beach	3A
1983	Garfield	4A
1982	Garfield	4A
1982	Rainier Beach	3A
1981	Garfield	4A
1974	West Seattle	4A
1972	Shoreline	4A
1971	Nathan Hale	4A

Volleyball

Year	School	Class
2022	Lakeside	3A
2016	Lakeside	3A
2010	Seattle Prep	3A
2009	Blanchet	3A
2006	Blanchet	3A
2004	Blanchet	3A
2003	Seattle Prep	3A
2002	Seattle Prep	3A
2001	Seattle Prep	3A
1991	Blanchet	3A
1978	Shorewood	3A
1975	West Seattle	4A
1974	Ingraham	4A
1973	Ingraham	4A

== Notable Metro League athletes ==
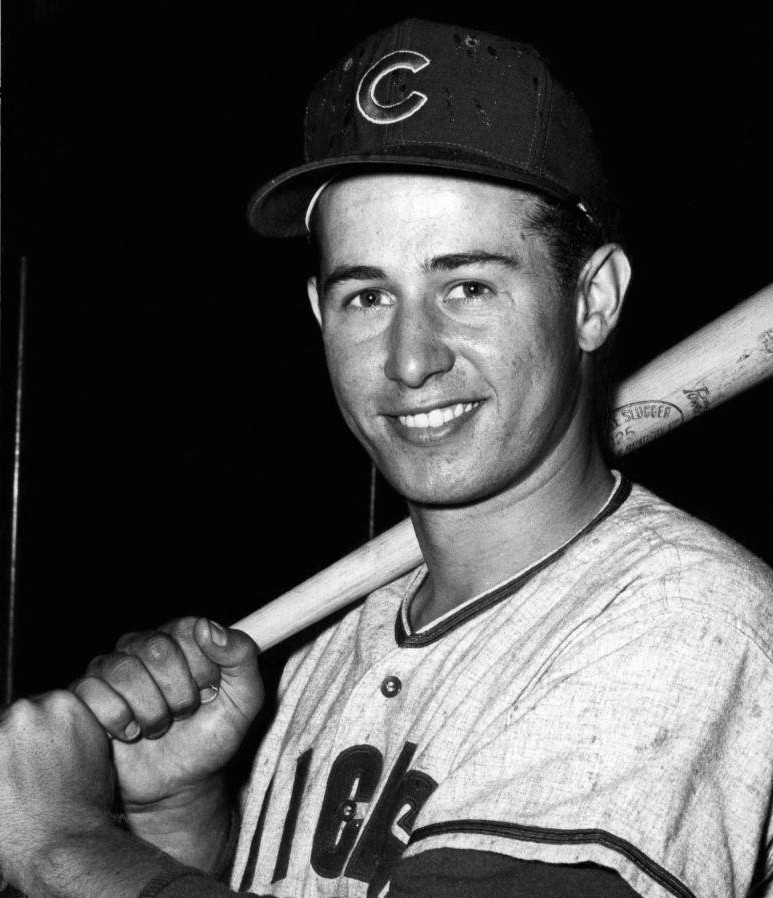
Ron Santo of Franklin.

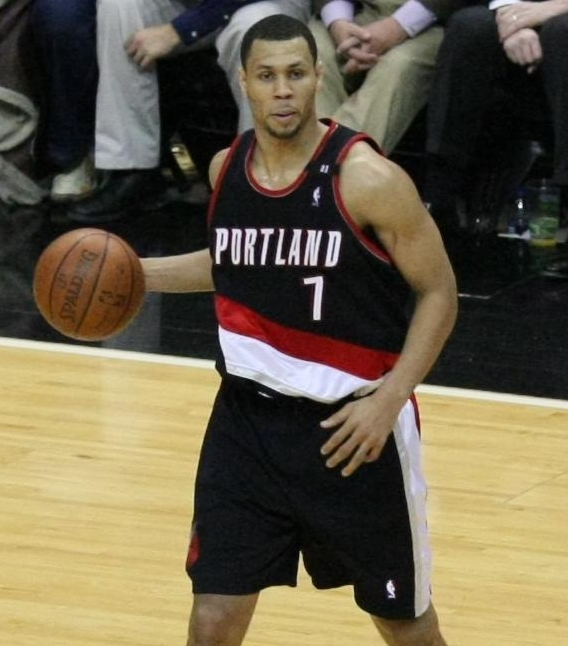
Brandon Roy a graduate of Garfield.

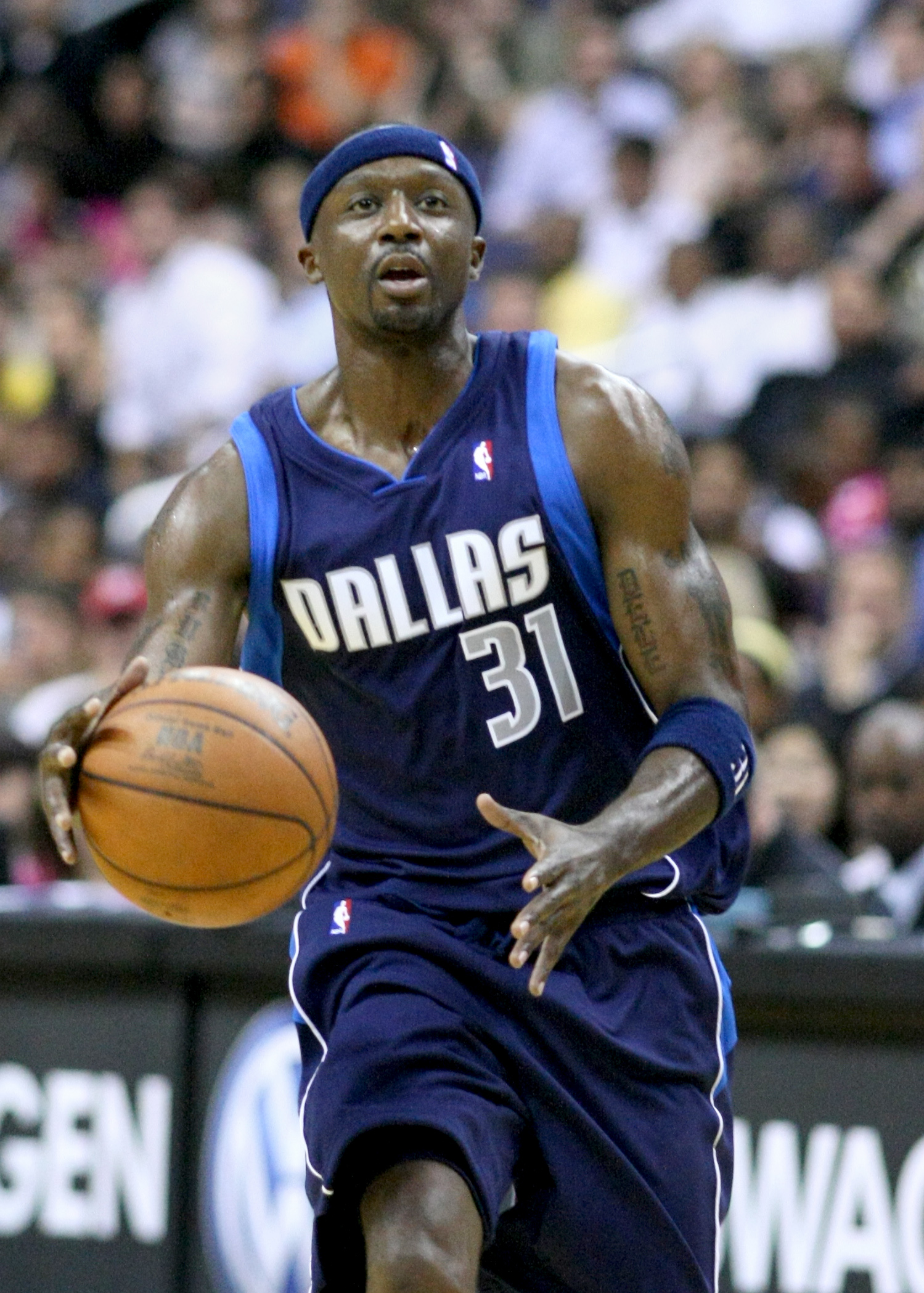
Jason Terry a graduate of Franklin.

Jason Terry a graduate of Franklin.

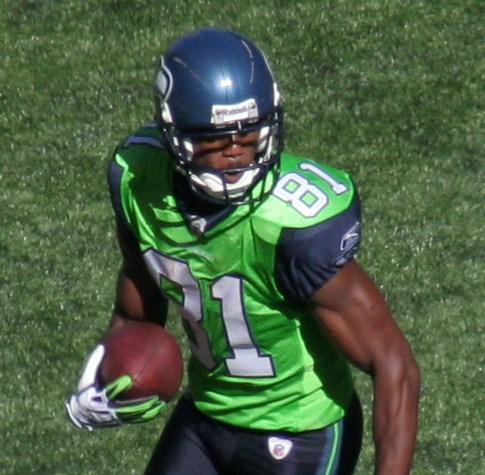
Nate Burleson of O'Dea.

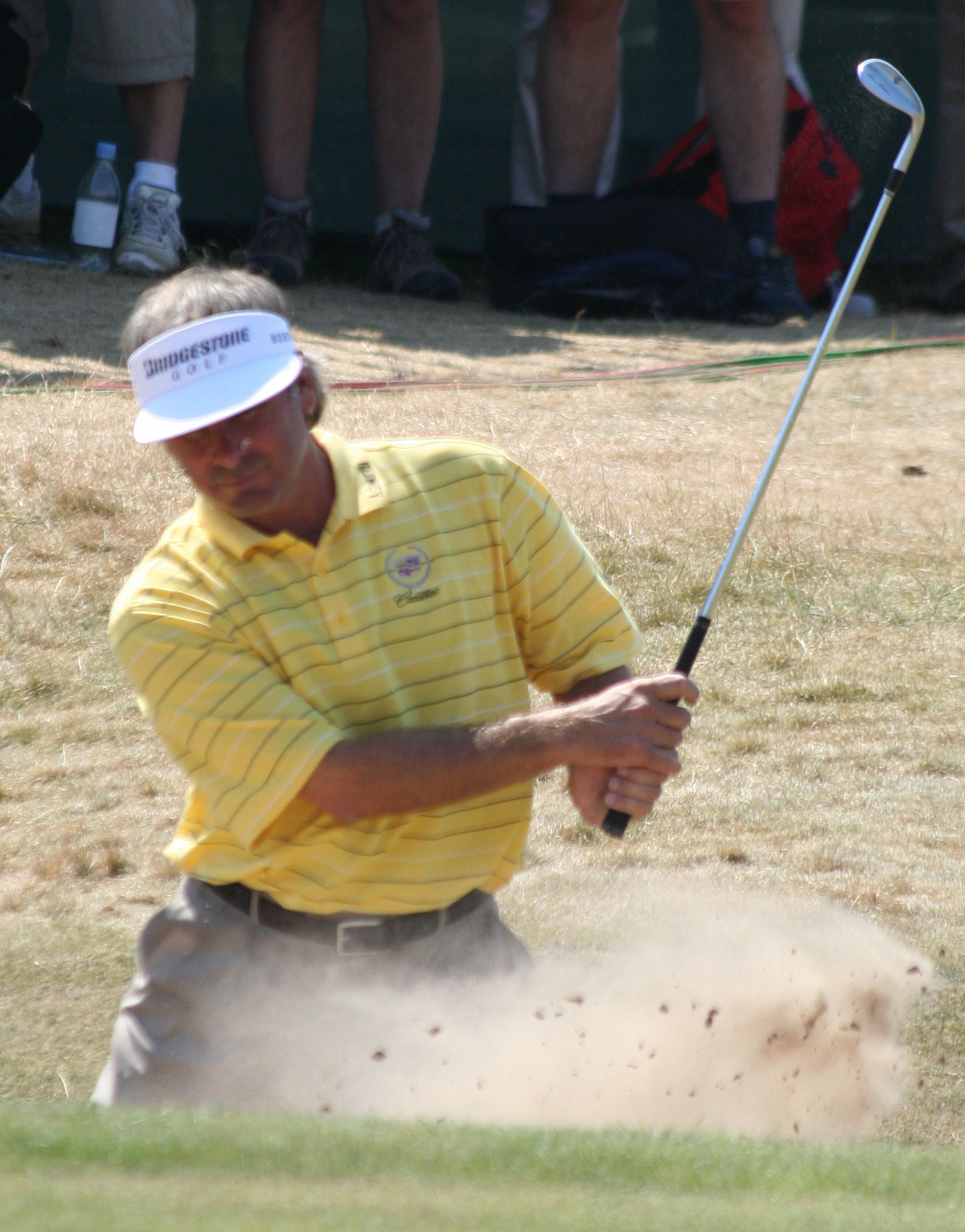
Fred Couples of O'Dea.

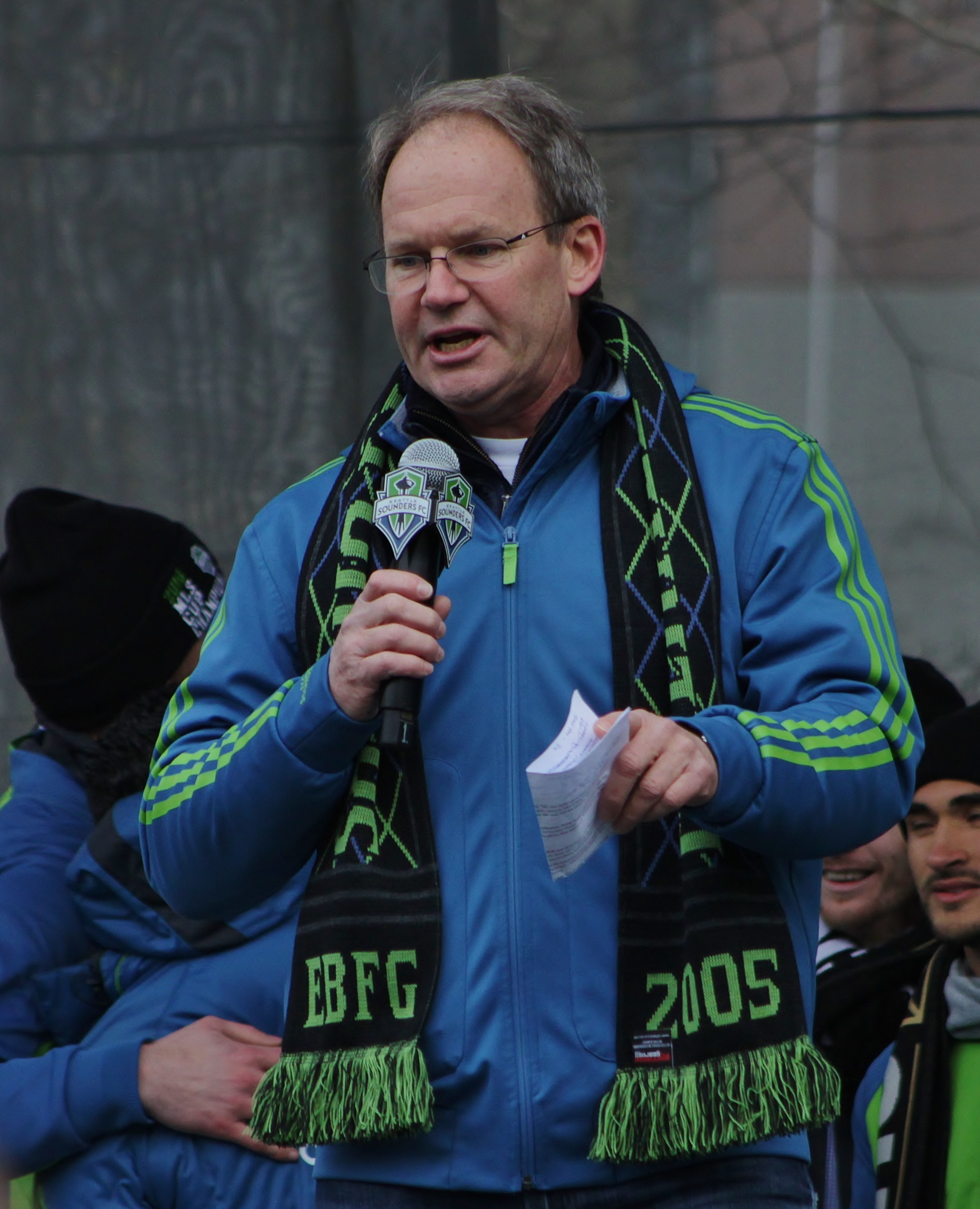
Brian Schmetzer of Nathan Hale.

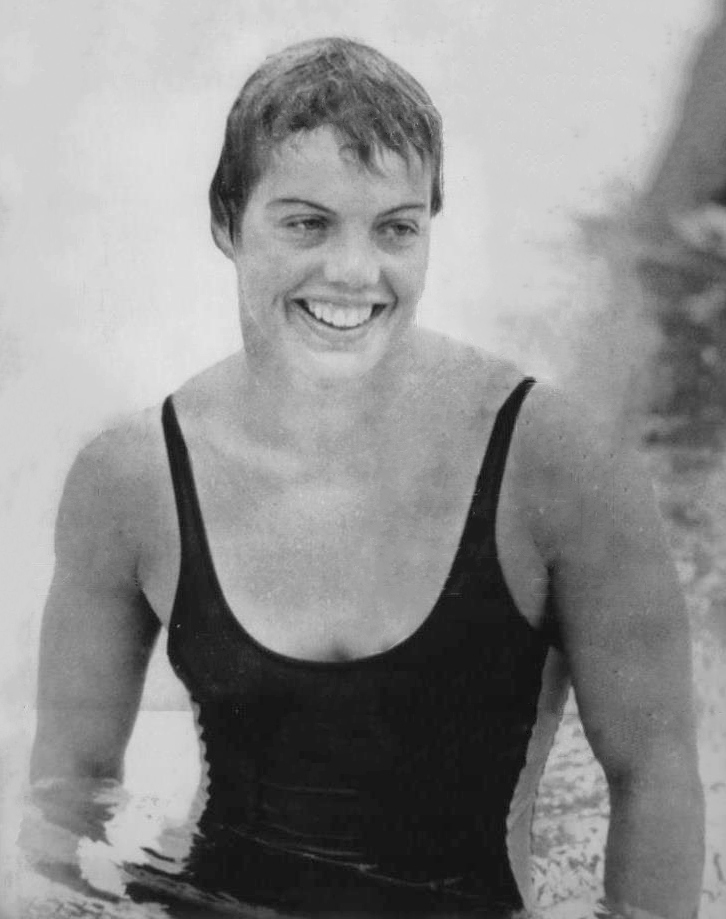
Lynn Colella, of Nathan Hale.

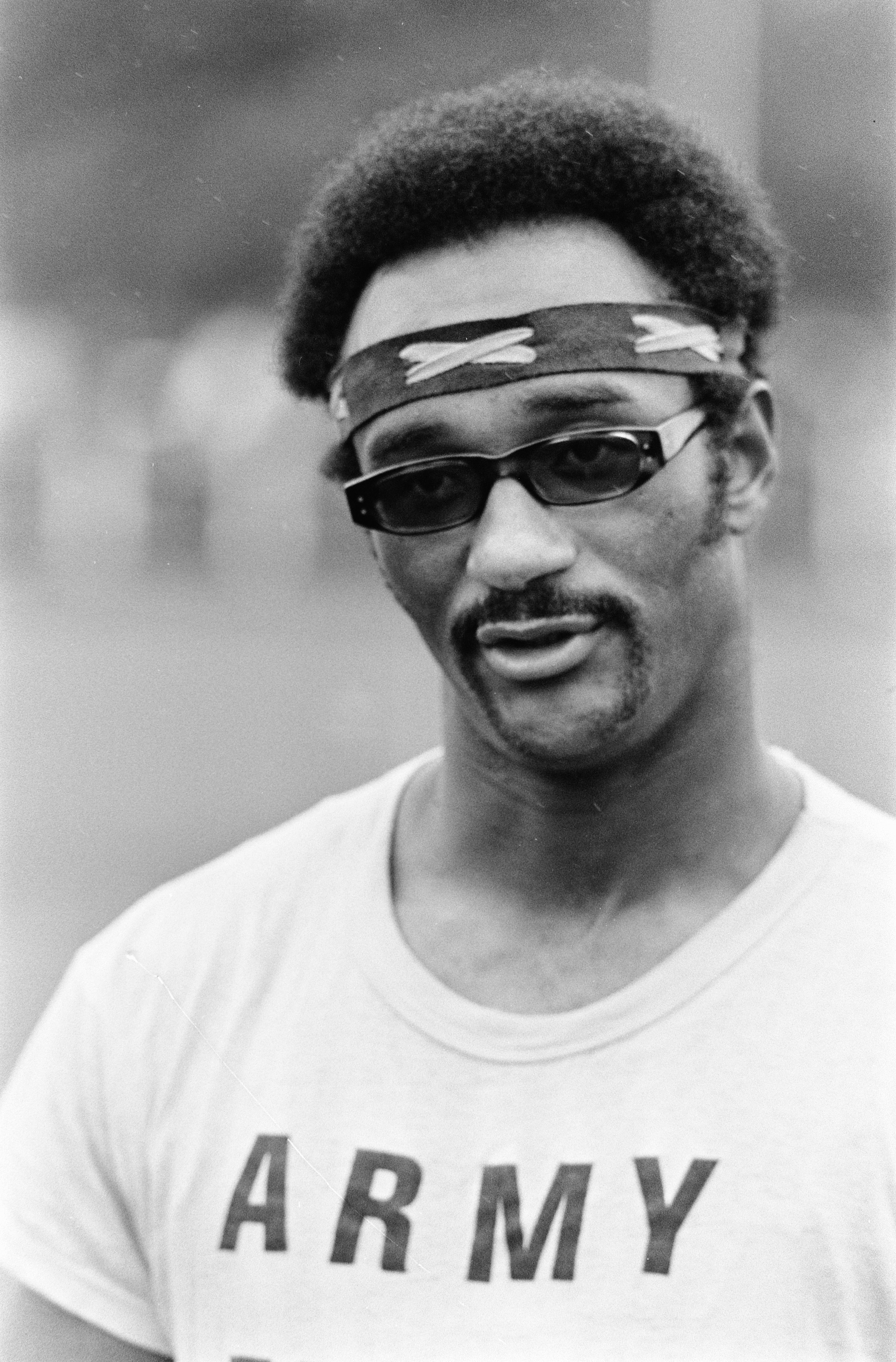
Charles Greene of O'Dea.

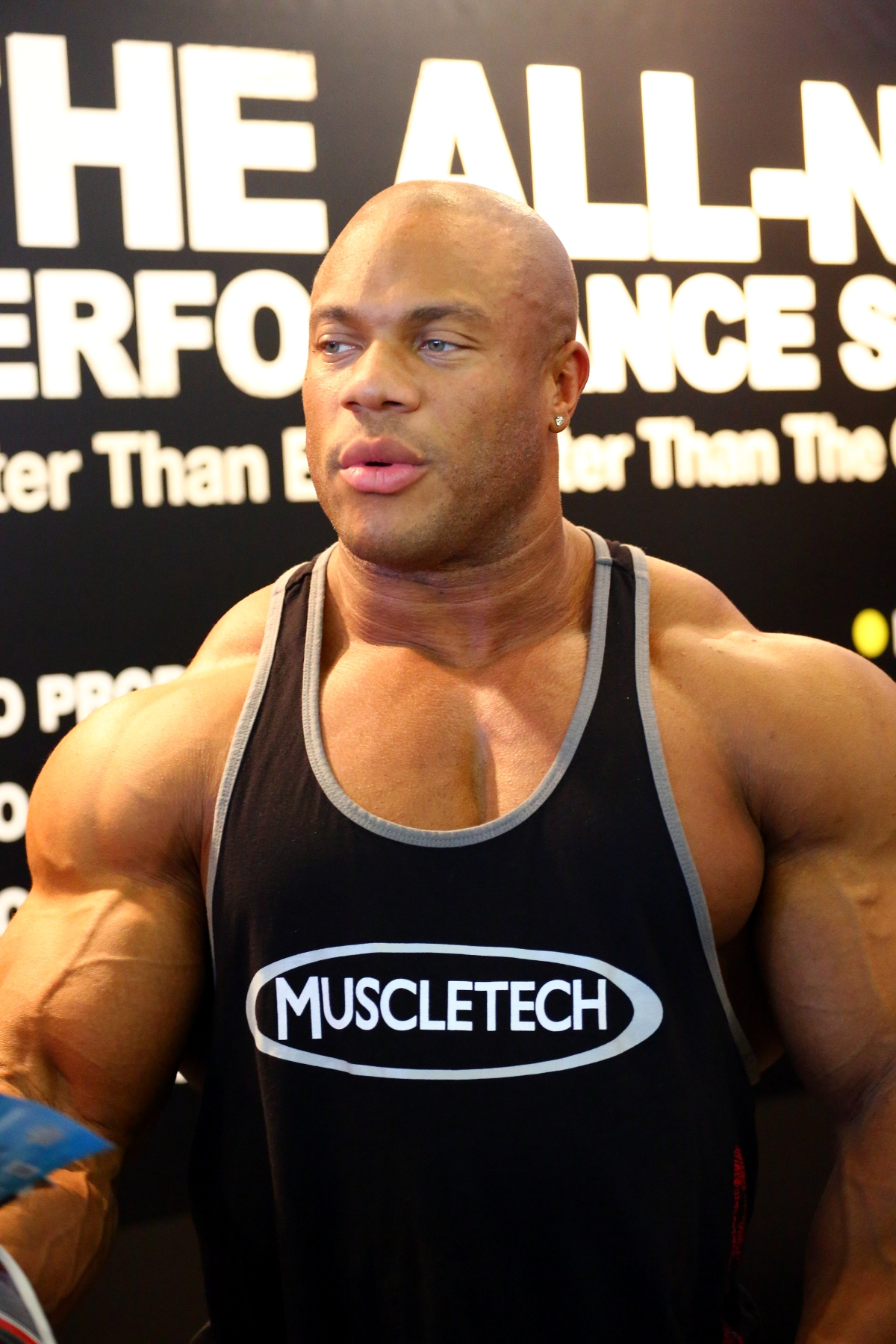
Phil Heath of Rainier Beach.

=== Baseball ===
- Ed Bahr (West Seattle)
- Matt Boyd (Eastside Catholic)
- Mike Budnick (Queen Anne)
- Corbin Carroll (Lakeside)
- Paul Dade (Nathan Hale)
- Rich Hand (Lincoln)
- Spencer Harris (Broadway)
- Jeff Heath (Garfield)
- John Hoffman (Franklin)
- Fred Hutchinson (Franklin)
- Chuck Jackson (Ingraham)
- Chet Johnson (Ballard)
- Earl Johnson (Ballard)
- Rondin Johnson (Chief Sealth)
- Keone Kela (Chief Sealth)
- Mike Kinnunen (Lincoln)
- Jake Lamb (Blanchet)
- Tom Lampkin (Blanchet)
- Bill Lasley (Lincoln)
- Charlie Mullen (Broadway)
- Billy North (Garfield)
- Ken Phelps (Ingraham)
- Bob Reynolds (Ingraham)
- Charlie Schmutz (Broadway)
- Pete Standridge (Lincoln)
- Ron Santo (Franklin)
- Joe Staton (Garfield)
- Mark Small (West Seattle)
- Sammy White (Lincoln)
- Eric Wilkins (Garfield)
- Dick Young (Lincoln)

=== Basketball ===
- Paolo Banchero (O'Dea)
- MarJon Beauchamp (Nathan Hale, Garfield, Rainier Beach)
- Bruno Boin (Franklin)
- Aaron Brooks (Franklin)
- Kevin Burleson (O'Dea)
- Doug Christie (Rainier Beach)
- Will Conroy (Garfield)
- Jamal Crawford (Rainier Beach)
- Gillian d'Hondt (Blanchet)
- Tara Davis (Rainier Beach)
- Tari Eason (Garfield)
- James Edwards (Roosevelt)
- Carl Ervin (Cleveland)
- C. J. Giles (Rainier Beach)
- Chuck Gilmur (Lincoln)
- Steven Gray (Bainbridge)
- Al Hairston (Garfield)
- Spencer Hawes (Seattle Prep)
- Bob Houbregs (Queen Anne)
- George Irvine (Ballard)
- Trent Johnson (Franklin)
- Sheila Lambert (Chief Sealth)
- Naomi Mulitauaopele (Chief Sealth)
- Dejounte Murray (Rainier Beach)
- Jaylen Nowell (Garfield)
- Jawann Oldham (Cleveland)
- Michael Porter Jr. (Nathan Hale)
- Jontay Porter (Nathan Hale)
- Kevin Porter Jr. (Rainier Beach)
- Clint Richardson (O'Dea)
- Nate Robinson (Rainier Beach)
- Brandon Roy (Garfield)
- Tre Simmons (Garfield)
- Peyton Siva (Franklin)
- Doug Smart (Garfield)
- Rhonda Smith (Franklin)
- Alvin Snow (Franklin)
- Jason Terry (Franklin)
- Matisse Thybulle (Eastside Catholic)
- Joyce Walker (Garfield)
- Martell Webster (Seattle Prep)
- Damon Williams (Ballard)
- Marcus Williams (Roosevelt)
- Terrence Williams (Rainier Beach)
- Lindsey Wilson (Roosevelt)
- Tom Workman (Blanchet)
- Tony Wroten (Garfield)

=== Football ===
- Anthony Allen (Garfield)
- Byron "By" Bailey (West Seattle)
- Mario Bailey (Franklin)
- Kay Bell (Lincoln)
- Bob Bellinger (Seattle Prep)
- Pat Brady (O'Dea)
- Hunter Bryant (Eastside Catholic)
- Nate Burleson (O'Dea)
- Leo Calland (Broadway)
- Chuck Carroll (Garfield)
- Jesse Chatman (Franklin)
- John Cherberg (Queen Anne)
- Deandre Coleman (Garfield)
- Josh Conerly Jr. (Rainier Beach)
- Bo Cornell (Roosevelt)
- Don Coryell (Lincoln)
- Corey Dillon (Nathan Hale/Franklin)
- Demetrius DuBose (O'Dea)
- Bryce Fisher (Seattle Prep)
- Lee Folkins (Roosevelt)
- Myles Gaskin (O'Dea)
- Reggie Grant (Chief Sealth)
- Fritz Greenlee (Franklin)
- Tom Greenlee (Franklin)
- Aaron Grymes (West Seattle)
- Halvor Hagen (Ballard)
- Homer Harris (Garfield)
- James Hasty (Franklin)
- Bruce Jarvis, (Franklin)
- Greg Lewis (Ingraham)
- Joe Lombardi (Seattle Prep)
- Taylor Mays (O'Dea)
- Terry Metcalf (Franklin)
- Hugh Millen (Roosevelt)
- Charley Mitchell (Garfield)
- Randy Montgomery (Cleveland)
- Mark Pattison (Roosevelt)
- Ryan Phillips (Franklin)
- Aaron Pierce (Franklin)
- Ray Pinney (Shorecrest)
- Trent Pollard (Rainier Beach)
- Rick Redman (Blanchet)
- Gee Scott Jr. (Eastside Catholic)
- Rick Sharp (Queen Anne)
- Sig Sigurdson (Ballard)
- Ed Simmons (Nathan Hale)
- Isaiah Stanback (Garfield)
- Joe Steele (Blanchet)
- Alameda Ta'amu (Rainier Beach)
- Brice Taylor (Franklin)
- JT Tuimoloau (Eastside Catholic)
- Tom Turnure (Roosevelt)
- Marc Wilson (Shorecrest)
- Tony Zackery (Franklin)

=== Golf ===
- Don Bies (Ballard)
- Fred Couples (O'Dea)
- Rick Fehr (Nathan Hale)
- Harry Givan (Lincoln)
- Ruth Jessen (Roosevelt)
- Karsten Solheim (Ballard)
- Bill Wright (Franklin)
- Kermit Zarley (West Seattle)

=== Martial arts ===
- Sandra Bacher (Franklin)
- Josh Barnett (Ballard)
- Kenny Ellis (Rainier Beach)
- David Jackson (Garfield)
- Maurice Smith (West Seattle)
- Queen Underwood (Garfield)
- Kenji Yamada (Franklin)

=== Rowing ===
- Chuck Alm (Roosevelt)
- John Biglow (Lakeside)
- Sherry Cassuto (Lakeside)
- Ky Ebright (Broadway)
- Paul Enquist (Ballard)
- Ted Garhart (Garfield)
- Lou Gellermann (Roosevelt)
- Jan Harville (Roosevelt)
- Phil Henry (Lakeside)
- Tamara Jenkins (Roosevelt)
- Betsy McCagg (Lakeside)
- Mary McCagg (Lakeside)
- Jordan Malloch (Nathan Hale)
- Katie Maloney (Rainier Beach)
- Lindsay Meyer (Holy Names)
- Allen Morgan (Queen Anne)
- Lianne Nelson (Lakeside)
- Shyril O'Steen (Garfield)
- Lia Pernell, (Garfield)
- Joe Rantz (Roosevelt)
- Roy Rubin (Roosevelt)
- Al Ulbrickson Jr. (Roosevelt)
- Al Ulbrickson Sr. (Franklin)
- Raymond Wright (Lakeside)
- Mike Yonker (Roosevelt)

=== Soccer ===
- Seyi Adekoya (Lakeside)
- Handwalla Bwana (Ballard)
- Jerry Cameron (Ballard)
- Ethan Dobbelaere (Roosevelt)
- Aaron Kovar (Garfield)
- Ellis McLoughlin (Blanchet)
- Brian Schmetzer (Nathan Hale)
- Wynne McIntosh (Roosevelt)
- DeAndre Yedlin (O'Dea)

=== Swimming ===
- Lynn Colella (Nathan Hale)
- Rick Colella (Nathan Hale)
- Ray Daughters (Queen Anne)
- B. J. Johnson (Garfield)
- Helene Madison (Lincoln)
- Jack Medica (Lincoln)
- Jillian Penner (Roosevelt)
- Emily Silver (Bainbridge)

=== Tennis ===
- Patricia Bostrom (Chief Sealth)
- Tom Gorman (Seattle Prep)
- Dick Knight (Shoreline)
- Henry Prusoff (Garfield)

=== Track and field ===
- Steve Anderson (Queen Anne)
- Duncan Atwood (Lakeside)
- Michael Berry (Rainier Beach)
- Ginnie Crawford (Rainier Beach)
- J. Ira Courtney (Broadway)
- Edwin Genung (Roosevelt)
- Charles Greene (O'Dea)
- Don Kardong (Seattle Prep)
- Herm Nelson (Seattle Prep)
- Rick Noji (Franklin)
- Gus Pope (Queen Anne)
- Bill Roe (Nathan Hale)
- Cheryl Taplin (Cleveland)

=== Other ===
- Debbie Armstrong (Garfield)
- Fred Beckey (West Seattle)
- Royal Brougham (Franklin)
- Dewey Soriano (Franklin)
- Ray Eckmann (Lincoln)
- William Farrell (O'Dea)
- Cheryl Glass (Nathan Hale)
- Allen Greene (O'Dea)
- Ila Ray Hadley (Roosevelt)
- Phil Heath (Rainier Beach)
- Rick Kaminski (Lincoln)
- Cynthia Kauffman (Franklin)
- Ronald Kauffman (Franklin)
- Leo Lassen (Lincoln)
- Darwin Meisnest (Lincoln)
- Kiel Reijnen (Bainbridge)
- Pete Schoening (Roosevelt)
- Bill Scott (Shoreline)
- Rachel Scott (Bainbridge)
- Dewey Soriano (Franklin)
- Masai Ujiri (Nathan Hale)
- Jim Whittaker (West Seattle)
- Lou Whittaker (West Seattle)
