= Ann T. O'Donnell =

American politician (1936–1965)

Member of the Washington House of Representatives
- In office 1959–1965
- Succeeded by: Marjorie Pitter King

Personal details
- Born: 1935
- Died: May 25, 1965 (aged 29–30)
- Party: Democratic

Ann T. O'Donnell (1936 – May 25, 1965) was an American politician who was a Democrat member of the Washington state House of Representatives from 1959 to 1965. She died in office.
