= Marjorie Pitter King =

American politician (1921–1996)

Member of the Washington House of Representatives from the 37th district
- In office September 2, 1965 – 1966
- Preceded by: Ann T. O'Donnell
- Succeeded by: David Sprague

Personal details
- Born: Marjorie Edwina Pitter; March 8, 1921 Seattle, Washington, US
- Died: January 28, 1996 (aged 74) Seattle, Washington, US
- Party: Democratic
- Occupation: Politician, accountant

Marjorie Edwina Pitter King (March 8, 1921 – January 28, 1996) was an American accountant, business owner, and politician who served in the Washington House of Representatives from 1965 through 1966. She was the first African American woman to serve in the Washington State Legislature. She was appointed to fill the unexpired term of Ann O’Donnell, who died in office. She lost a 1966 primary election and left office.

== Life and career ==
Born in Seattle in 1921 to Edward and Marjorie Pitter, she graduated from Garfield High School and studied accounting at the University of Washington and at Howard University but did not graduate. She founded and ran an accounting and tax preparation business in Seattle for 48 years until selling the business in 1995. She often helped people who could not pay for her services or who could not read or write English. Her Seattle Times obituary called her “one of the state’s earliest, most enduring African-American businesswomen.”

A lifelong activist in the state Democratic Party, Pitter King served as chair of the 37th District Democrats, president of the Metropolitan Democratic Central Committee, vice chair of the King County Democratic Party, and treasurer of the Washington State Federation of Democratic Women. She also served on the boards of the YMCA and the Seattle Urban League and on the State Women’s Civil Rights Committee. At the 1964 Democratic National Convention, she campaigned to seat the Mississippi Freedom Democratic Party.

Following the untimely death of Ann T. O'Donnell, a Democratic state representative from the 37th district, the King County Democrats Executive Board recommended Pitter King to serve out the remainder of O'Donnell's term. The county commissioners appointed her to the legislature effective September 2, 1965. She served through 1966, becoming the first Black woman to serve in the Washington State Legislature. She sought a full term but lost the Democratic primary election to David Sprague in 1966. She held no other elected office. Married with two sons, she died in Seattle in 1996.
