= Shoreline High School =

Coordinates: 47°45′53″N 122°19′43″W

- 18560 1st Ave NE; Shoreline, Washington 98155; United States

Information
- Type: Public
- Established: 1955
- Closed: 1986
- School district: Shoreline School District
- Enrollment: 1,900 at peak (1959)
- Colors: Blue and Gold
- Athletics conference: Metro League (1960-1979) Wesco (1979-1986)
- Mascot: Spartans

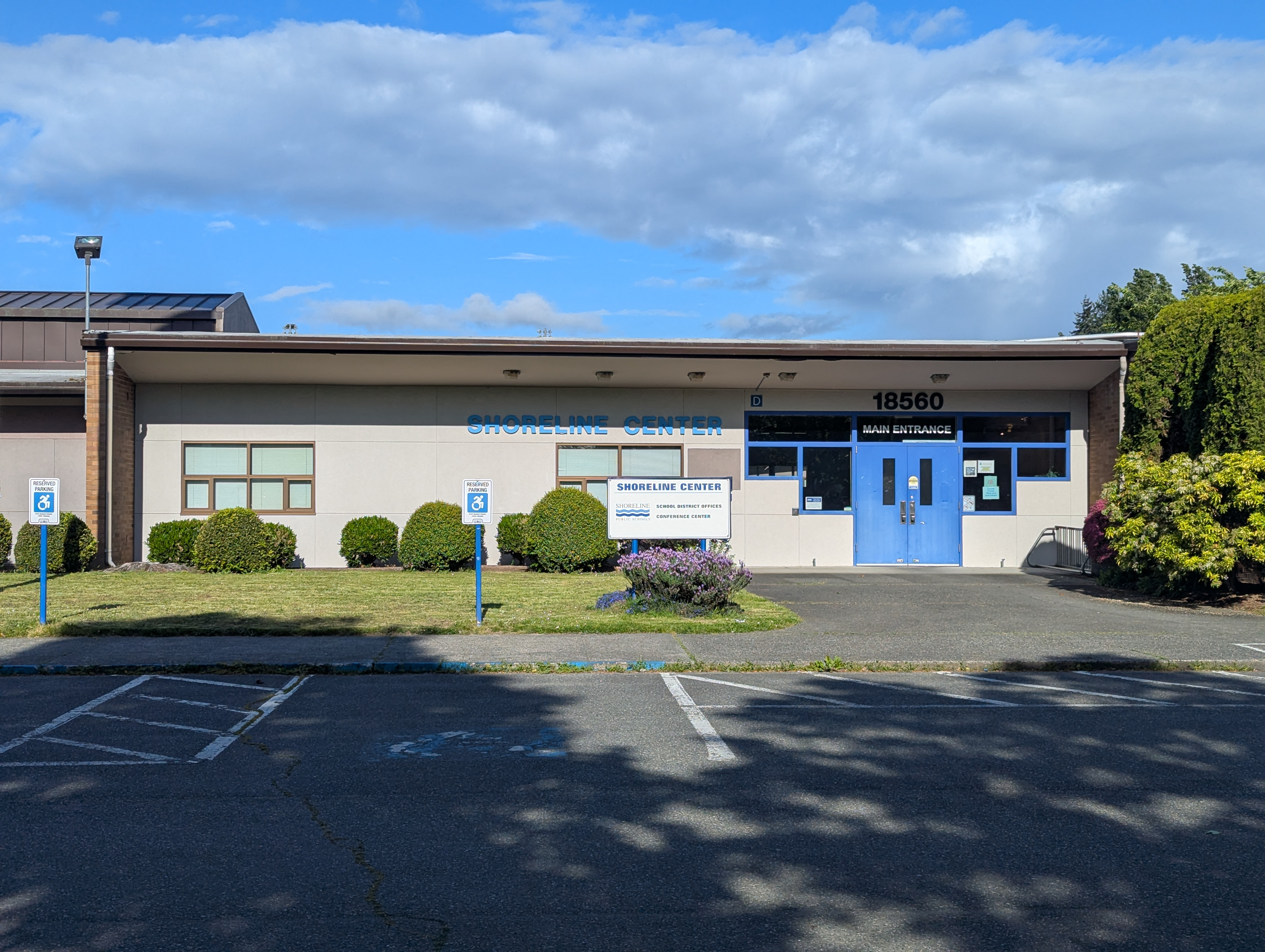
Shoreline High School

Shoreline High School was a public high school in Shoreline, Washington, United States, in the Shoreline School District. Shoreline opened in 1955 and closed in 1986.

== History ==
Prior to the opening of Shoreline High School, students in Shoreline were forced to attend high school in surrounding districts. Many were bused to Roosevelt and Lincoln High Schools in Seattle, with some attending Bothell High School. Shoreline High School opened its doors in September 1955. In the first year the school only had ninth and tenth grades. The 1956–57 school year saw the introduction of 11th grade with the 1957–58 school year completing the high school with the start of 12th grade.

In 1984 the Shoreline School Board voted to close the Shoreline High School at the end of the 1985–86 school year. The reasons for the closure were due to declining enrollments and monetary issues. Shoreline was the oldest of the three high schools in the district and thus the most expensive to modernize. Shoreline High School students who had not graduated by 1986 continued their schooling at one of the two remaining Shoreline high schools. Once closed the Shoreline High School building became used as the Shoreline School District administration offices.

== Notable alumni ==
- Mick Kelleher, former Major League Baseball player and coach
- Merrilee Rush, a rock-and-roll singer best known for her recording of the song "Angel of the Morning"
- Brian Sternberg, NCAA pole vaulting champion (1963; University of Washington) and two-time world record holder (16' 8" on Jun 7, 1963), who was left a quadriplegic after a trampoline accident just a few weeks after setting the world record. SHS Class of 1961.
- Philip M. Pallenberg, Alaska Superior Court judge (2007–2021). Career as an attorney also included being in private practice, being a public defender and serving as a part-time U.S. Magistrate judge. Graduated from Shoreline in 1976 at the age 14. B.S. Chemistry from University of Washington (1980). University of Washington School of Law (1983).
