= Gisele Fox =

American fashion model

- Born: 2001 (age 24–25); Seattle, Washington, U.S.
- Modeling information
- Hair color: Red
- Eye color: Brown
- Agency: Elite Model Management (Paris); Monster Management (Milan); Select Model Management (London); SMG (Seattle); Bravo Models (Tokyo)

Gisele Fox (born 2001) is an American fashion model.

== Career ==
Fox started modeling in her native Seattle, Washington, after having lived in Italy for four and a half years. Her looks have been described as "gamine" and "elfin"; she has been compared to the supermodel Karen Elson. She has modeled for Miu Miu, Valentino, Marni, Marc Jacobs, Fendi, Dior, Margiela, Lanvin, Givenchy, Hermès, Jil Sander, Calvin Klein and Prada (which she closed). She has appeared in advertisements for Prada, Versace, Marc Jacobs, Coach New York, Michael Kors, and McQ, Fox has been on the cover of Interview as well as Vogue Thailand.

Fox is known for her pixie cut.
