= Deandre Coleman =

American football player (born 1991)

No. 62, 98
- Position: Defensive tackle

Personal information
- Born: January 27, 1991 (age 35); Seattle, Washington, U.S.
- Listed height: 6 ft 5 in (1.96 m)
- Listed weight: 314 lb (142 kg)

Career information
- High school: Garfield (Seattle)
- College: California
- NFL draft: 2014: undrafted

Career history
- Jacksonville Jaguars (2014)*; Miami Dolphins (2014–2015); Denver Broncos (2015)*; Miami Dolphins (2015); Buffalo Bills (2016–2017)
- * Offseason or practice squad member only

Career NFL statistics
- Total tackles: 14
- Stats at Pro Football Reference

Deandre Lamar Coleman (born January 27, 1991) is an American former professional football player who was a defensive tackle in the National Football League (NFL). He played college football for the California Golden Bears. He was signed as an undrafted free agent by the Jacksonville Jaguars following the 2014 NFL draft.

== Early life ==
Coleman attended Garfield High School. He made the roster of the high school varsity football team in his freshman year. He was selected to the Parade Magazine All-America team and was selected to the first-team all-state. He recorded 45 tackles and two forced fumbles in his Junior season in high school. In his Senior season, he recorded 46 tackles, two sacks, and a fumble recovery.

College recruiting
| Name | Hometown | School | Height | Weight | 40^{‡} | Commit date |
|---|---|---|---|---|---|---|
| Deandre Coleman; DT | Seattle, Washington | Garfield High School | 6 ft 4 in (1.93 m) | 295 lb (134 kg) | 5.2 | Oct 3, 2008 |
| Deandre Coleman; DT | Recruit ratings: Scout: Rivals: | | | | | |
Overall recruit ranking: Scout: 34 (DT) Rivals: 106 National, 11 (DT), 1 (Wash)
‡ Refers to 40-yard dash; Note: In many cases, Scout, Rivals, 247Sports, On3, and ESPN may conflict in their listings of height, weight and 40 time.; In these cases, the average was taken. ESPN grades are on a 100-point scale.; Sources: "California Football Commitments". Rivals.; "2009 California Football Recruiting Commits". Scout.; "Scout.com Team Recruiting Rankings". Scout.; "2009 Team Ranking". Rivals.com.

== College career ==
At the University of California, Berkeley, Coleman was selected to the second-team preseason All-Pac-12 prior to his senior season. On June 19, 2013, he was selected to the Athlon's Preseason All-Pac-12 team prior his senior season. On July 11, 2013, he was named to the College Sports Madness All-Pac-12 preseason team. On July 11, 2013, he was named on the Outland Trophy Watch List. On December 20, 2013, he also was selected to Phil Steele's All-Pac-12 team following his senior season.

== Professional career ==
=== Jacksonville Jaguars ===
Following the 2014 NFL draft, Coleman was signed by the Jacksonville Jaguars as an undrafted free agent. The Jaguars released Coleman on August 29, 2014. He was signed to the practice squad on August 30, 2014.

=== Miami Dolphins (first stint) ===
On September 23, 2014, the Miami Dolphins signed Coleman off the Jacksonville Jaguars' practice squad. On September 5, 2015, he was waived by the Dolphins. On the following day, Coleman was signed to the Dolphins' practice squad. On September 15, 2015, he was released by the Dolphins.

=== Denver Broncos ===
On September 22, 2015, the Denver Broncos signed Coleman to their practice squad. On November 4, 2015, he was released by the Broncos.

=== Miami Dolphins (second stint) ===
On November 18, 2015, Coleman was signed to the Dolphins' practice squad. On November 25, 2015, he was released from practice squad. On December 1, 2015, he was re-signed to the practice squad. On December 14, 2015, he was promoted to the active roster. On September 3, 2016, he was released by the Dolphins as part of final roster cuts.

=== Buffalo Bills ===
On September 7, 2016, Coleman was signed to the Bills' practice squad. He was promoted to the active roster on November 29, 2016.

On September 5, 2017, Coleman was released by the Bills, but was re-signed on September 20. He was released again on September 26, 2017. He was re-signed again on November 14, 2017. He was waived on December 26, 2017.
