= Cormac Ryan =

American basketball player (born 1998)

No. 30 – Milwaukee Bucks
- Position: Shooting guard
- League: NBA

Personal information
- Born: October 26, 1998 (age 28) New York City, New York, U.S.
- Listed height: 6 ft 5 in (1.96 m)
- Listed weight: 205 lb (93 kg)

Career information
- High school: Collegiate School (New York City, New York); Milton Academy (Milton, Massachusetts)
- College: Stanford (2018–2019); Notre Dame (2020–2023); North Carolina (2023–2024)
- NBA draft: 2024: undrafted
- Playing career: 2024–present

Career history
- 2024–2025: Oklahoma City Blue
- 2025–2026: Wisconsin Herd
- 2026–present: Milwaukee Bucks
- 2026–present: →Wisconsin Herd
- Stats at NBA.com
- Stats at Basketball Reference

Cormac Joseph Ryan (born October 26, 1998) is an American professional basketball player for the Milwaukee Bucks of the National Basketball Association (NBA), on a two-way contract with the Wisconsin Herd of the NBA G League. He played college basketball for the Stanford Cardinal, Notre Dame Fighting Irish, and North Carolina Tar Heels.

== Early life and high school ==
Ryan was born on October 26, 1998. Growing up, his hometown was Manhattan in New York, New York, where he first attended Collegiate School. Ryan played basketball as a freshman and sophomore at Collegiate School.

After his sophomore year, Ryan transferred to Milton Academy in Milton, Massachusetts, where he reclassified as a sophomore and would play basketball for the rest of his high school career. In his junior year, Ryan averaged 19.0 points, 6.5 rebounds, and 5.0 assists for Milton and helped lead them to the semifinals of the New England Preparatory School Athletic Council (NEPSAC) playoffs. Ryan's production increased his senior year, with him averaging 23.5 points, 7.0 rebounds, and 5.5 assists, which contributed to Milton finishing as the runner-up in the NEPSAC playoffs. In total, Ryan scored 1,423 points for Milton Academy, additionally being nominated to the All-NEPSAC team all three years at Milton, with him being nominated as player of the year for the NEPSAC in both his junior and senior years.

=== Recruiting ===
In high school, Ryan was rated as a four-star recruit. He was ranked No. 63 by ESPN, No. 64 by 247Sports Composite and No. 77 by Rivals. Additionally, Ryan was considered a top-three player from the state of New York. Ryan chose to sign with Stanford under coach Jerod Haase despite predictions that he would sign with Northwestern. Besides Northwestern, Ryan also received other offers from Florida, Indiana, Notre Dame, Villanova, and Michigan.

College recruiting
Name	Hometown	School	Height	Weight	Commit date
Cormac Ryan; SG	New York, NY	Milton Academy	6 ft 5 in (1.96 m)	175 lb (79 kg)	Jun 4, 2017
Cormac Ryan; SG	Recruit ratings: Scout: Rivals: 247Sports: ESPN: (85)				
Overall recruit ranking: Rivals: 77 247Sports: 64 ESPN: 63
Note: In many cases, Scout, Rivals, 247Sports, On3, and ESPN may conflict in their listings of height and weight.; In these cases, the average was taken. ESPN grades are on a 100-point scale.; Sources: "Stanford 2018 Basketball Commitments". Rivals.; "2018 Stanford Cardinal Recruiting Class". ESPN.; "2018 Team Ranking". Rivals.

== College career ==
=== Stanford ===
==== 2018–19 season ====
Ryan came into Stanford as the highest-rated recruit for the Cardinal. In his college debut, Ryan scored 16 points with 4 rebounds and 1 assist against Seattle. Ryan scored double-digit points against teams ranked in the top ten, scoring 14 points in a loss against No. 7 North Carolina and 12 points in an overtime loss against No. 2 Kansas. On January 6, Ryan scored 18 points against USC. Ryan scored a season-best 19 points in a win over UCLA on February 16. Overall, Ryan started 17 out of 24 games for Stanford and averaged 8.7 points, 3.5 rebounds, and 1.8 assists with ten games in which he scored double-digit points.

=== Notre Dame ===
==== 2019–20 season ====
Before the 2019–20 season, Ryan transferred to Notre Dame. Ryan redshirted in his first year at Notre Dame and thus did not play the entire season.

==== 2020–21 season ====
In his debut game for Notre Dame, Ryan was named a starter and scored 13 points with 1 rebound and 3 assists against No. 13 Michigan State. On January 30, Ryan tied his career-high with 19 points in a win over Pittsburgh. He set a new career-high in points on February 9, scoring 28 in Notre Dame's second win all-time at Duke. Ryan started 16 out of 25 games for Notre Dame and averaged 9.9 points, 4.4 rebounds, and 2.5 assists, with an increased twelve games with double-digit scoring.

==== 2021–22 season ====
Entering his redshirt junior year, Ryan was again named a starter before the beginning of the season. In the quarterfinal game of the ACC Tournament, he scored 20 points despite Notre Dame's elimination by eventual champion Virginia Tech. Ryan recorded a career-high 29 points against Alabama, upsetting them in the Round of 64 in the 2022 NCAA tournament. Overall, Ryan started 22 out of 35 games, averaging 9.2 points, 4.8 rebounds, and 1.9 assists, helping Notre Dame advance to the Round of 32 before losing to Texas Tech.

==== 2022–23 season ====
Ryan was named a starter before the season began his redshirt senior year. As a part of the ACC–Big Ten Challenge, Ryan scored 23 points to help Notre Dame win against No. 20 Michigan State. On December 7, Ryan scored 21 points in a win against Boston University. In the final win of the season and Ryan's career at Notre Dame, he scored 20 points against No. 25 Pittsburgh. Ryan started all 32 games of the season and averaged 12.3 points, 4.0 rebounds, and 2.5 assists.

=== North Carolina ===
==== 2023–24 season ====
Before the beginning of the 2023–24 season, Ryan transferred to North Carolina, using the extra year of eligibility granted by the NCAA because of the shortened 2020–21 season. In his debut game for North Carolina, Ryan recorded 13 points with 3 rebounds and 3 assists against Radford. As a part of the CBS Sports Classic, Ryan recorded 20 points in a loss to No. 14 Kentucky. On March 9, Ryan set a new career-high in points with 31 in a win against No. 9 Duke. Ryan started 34 out of his 36 games played and averaged 11.5 points, 2.8 rebounds, and 1.2 assists.

== Professional career ==
After going undrafted in the 2024 NBA draft, Ryan joined the Oklahoma City Thunder for the 2024 NBA Summer League and on September 27, 2024, he signed with the team. However, he was waived on October 18 and on October 25, he joined the Oklahoma City Blue.

Ryan joined the Milwaukee Bucks for the 2025 NBA Summer League, and was subsequently invited to the Bucks' training camp. On November 7, 2025, Ryan was named to the Wisconsin Herd's opening night roster. On February 26, 2026, Ryan signed a two-way contract with the Milwaukee Bucks, receiving the first in-season NBA contract of his career. On April 1, Ryan scored a then career-high 25 points during a 119–113 loss to the Houston Rockets. On April 10, Ryan put up a career-high 28 points in his first career start during a 125–108 win over the Brooklyn Nets.

== Personal life ==
Ryan is the son of Michael and Rosemary Ryan. Both Michael and one of Cormac Ryan's four brothers, Thomas, played basketball at Yale.

== Career statistics ==
Legend
GP	Games played	GS	Games started	MPG	Minutes per game
FG%	Field goal percentage	3P%	3-point field goal percentage	FT%	Free throw percentage
RPG	Rebounds per game	APG	Assists per game	SPG	Steals per game
BPG	Blocks per game	PPG	Points per game	**Bold**	Career high

=== NBA ===
Year	Team	GP	GS	MPG	FG%	3P%	FT%	RPG	APG	SPG	BPG	PPG
2025–26	Milwaukee	11	2	24.6	.520	.458	.923	2.5	1.7	1.0	.3	14.3
Career		11	2	24.6	.520	.458	.923	2.5	1.7	1.0	.3	14.3

=== College ===
Year	Team	GP	GS	MPG	FG%	3P%	FT%	RPG	APG	SPG	BPG	PPG
2018–19	Stanford	24	17	28.5	.333	.316	.737	3.5	1.9	1.0	.2	8.7
2019–20	Notre Dame	Redshirt										
2020–21	Notre Dame	25	16	29.4	.387	.344	.822	4.4	**2.5**	1.0	**.4**	9.9
2021–22	Notre Dame	35	22	30.0	**.454**	**.407**	.806	**4.8**	1.9	.9	.2	9.2
2022–23	Notre Dame	32	32	**34.0**	.409	.344	.827	4.0	**2.5**	1.3	**.4**	**12.3**
2023–24	North Carolina	**36**	**34**	30.3	.382	.354	**.874**	2.8	1.2	.7	**.4**	11.5
Career		152	121	30.6	.395	.352	.825	3.9	1.9	1.0	.3	10.4
