= 2018–19 Washington State Cougars men's basketball team =

American college basketball season

2018–19 Washington State Cougars men's basketball
- Conference: Pac-12 Conference
- Record: 11–21 (4–14 Pac-12)
- Head coach: Ernie Kent (5th season)
- Assistant coaches: Ed Haskins; Bennie Seltzer; Tim Marrion
- Home arena: Beasley Coliseum

2018–19 Pac-12 Conference men's basketball standings
	Conf.				Overall
Team	W		L	PCT	W		L	PCT
Washington	15	–	3	.833	27	–	9	.750
Arizona State	12	–	6	.667	23	–	11	.676
Utah	11	–	7	.611	17	–	14	.548
Oregon State	10	–	8	.556	18	–	13	.581
Colorado	10	–	8	.556	23	–	13	.639
Oregon †	10	–	8	.556	25	–	13	.658
UCLA	9	–	9	.500	17	–	16	.515
USC	8	–	10	.444	16	–	17	.485
Arizona	8	–	10	.444	17	–	15	.531
Stanford	8	–	10	.444	15	–	16	.484
Washington State	4	–	14	.222	11	–	21	.344
California	3	–	15	.167	8	–	23	.258
† Pac-12 Conference tournament winner

The 2018–19 Washington State Cougars men's basketball team represented Washington State University during the 2018–19 NCAA Division I men's basketball season. The team was led by fifth-year head coach Ernie Kent. The Cougars played their home games at the Beasley Coliseum in Pullman, Washington as members in the Pac-12 Conference. They finished the season 11–21, 4–14 in Pac-12 play to finish in 11th place. They lost in the first round of the Pac-12 tournament to Oregon.

At the conclusion of the season, Kent was fired.

== Previous season ==
The Cougars finished the 2017–18 season 12–19, 4–14 in Pac-12 play to finish in 11th place. They lost in the first round of the Pac-12 tournament to Oregon.

== Offseason ==
=== Departures ===
Name	Pos.	Height	Weight	Year	Hometown	Reason for departure
Drick Bernstine	F	6'8"	220	RS senior	Aurora, CO	Completed athletic eligibility
Steven Shpreyregin	G	6'1"	180	Senior	Seattle, WA	Graduated
K. J. Langston	G	6'4"	185	RS junior	Chicago, IL	Dismissed from team
Malachi Flynn	G	6'1"	170	Sophomore	Tacoma, WA	Transferred to San Diego State
Milan Acquaah	G	6'3"	185	RS freshman	Pasadena, CA	Transferred
Jamar Ergas	G	6'3"	182	Freshman	Toronto, ON	Transferred to South Plains College
T. J. Mickelson	G	6'1"	160	Freshman	Olympia, WA	Transferred to Lake Region State College
Kwinton Hinton	G	6'4"	215	Junior	Fairmount, GA	Left team

=== Incoming transfers ===
Name	Pos.	Height	Weight	Year	Hometown	Previous school
Isaiah Wade	F	6'8"	210	Junior	Minneapolis, MN	Iowa Western CC
Jervae Robinson	G	6'2"	180	Junior	Aurora, CO	Otero JC
Marvin Cannon	F	6'5"	160	Sophomore	Richmond, VA	Barton CC
Ahmed Ali	G	5'11"	165	Junior	Toronto, ON	Eastern Florida State College

=== 2018 recruiting class ===
College recruiting
Name	Hometown	School	Height	Weight	Commit date
C. J. Elleby; SF	Seattle, WA	Cleveland High School	6 ft 6 in (1.98 m)	180 lb (82 kg)	Sep 9, 2017
C. J. Elleby; SF	Recruit ratings: Scout: Rivals: 247Sports: ESPN:				
Aljaž Kunc; SF	Slovenia	Impact Academy	6 ft 8 in (2.03 m)	220 lb (100 kg)	Mar 23, 2018
Aljaž Kunc; SF	Recruit ratings: Scout: Rivals: 247Sports: ESPN:				
Overall recruit ranking:
Note: In many cases, Scout, Rivals, 247Sports, On3, and ESPN may conflict in their listings of height and weight.; In these cases, the average was taken. ESPN grades are on a 100-point scale.; Sources: "2018 Team Ranking". Rivals.

== Roster ==
2018–19 Washington State Cougars men's basketball team
Players
Coaches

Pos.	#	Name	Height	Weight	Year	Previous school	Hometown
F	0	Isaiah Wade	6 ft 7 in (2.01 m)	215 lb (98 kg)	Jr	Iowa Western CC	Minneapolis, MN
G	1	Jervae Robinson	6 ft 2 in (1.88 m)	185 lb (84 kg)	Jr	Otero JC	Aurora, CO
F	2	C. J. Elleby	6 ft 6 in (1.98 m)	185 lb (84 kg)	Fr	Cleveland HS	Seattle, WA
F	3	Robert Franks	6 ft 7 in (2.01 m)	240 lb (109 kg)	Sr	Evergreen HS	Vancouver, WA
G/F	4	Aljaz Kunc	6 ft 8 in (2.03 m)	198 lb (90 kg)	Fr	Impact Academy	Ljubljana, Slovenia
F	5	Marvin Cannon	6 ft 5 in (1.96 m)	170 lb (77 kg)	Jr	Barton CC	Richmond, VA
F	13	Jeff Pollard	6 ft 9 in (2.06 m)	240 lb (109 kg)	Jr	Impact Academy	Bountiful, UT
C	15	James Streeter (W)	6 ft 10 in (2.08 m)	270 lb (122 kg)	Jr	Lake Region State College	Coon Rapids, MN
G	23	Ahmed Ali	5 ft 11 in (1.8 m)	165 lb (75 kg)	Jr	Eastern Florida State College	Toronto, ON
G	24	Viont'e Daniels	6 ft 2 in (1.88 m)	175 lb (79 kg)	Sr	Federal Way HS	Federal Way, WA
F	25	Arinze Chidom	6 ft 9 in (2.06 m)	200 lb (91 kg)	RS So	Bishop O'Dowd HS	Oakland, CA
F	32	Davante Cooper	6 ft 11 in (2.11 m)	233 lb (106 kg)	Sr	Tyler Junior College	Atlanta, GA
G	35	Carter Skaggs	6 ft 5 in (1.96 m)	215 lb (98 kg)	Jr	Chipola College	Logansport, IN

Head coach

- Ernie Kent (Oregon)

Assistant coach(es)

- Ed Haskins (Eastern Washington)
- Bennie Seltzer (Washington State)
- Tim Marrion (Washington State)

Legend

- (C) Team captain
- (S) Suspended
- (I) Ineligible
- (W) Walk-on
- Injured
- Current redshirt

Roster

== Schedule and results ==
Date time, TV	Rank^{#}	Opponent^{#}	Result	Record	Site (attendance) city, state
Exhibition
November 4, 2018*; 2:00 pm		New Hope Christian	W 138–63		Beasley Coliseum; Pullman, WA
Non-conference regular season
November 11, 2018*; 4:00 pm, P12N		Nicholls	W 89–72	1–0	Beasley Coliseum (2,090); Pullman, WA
November 14, 2018*; 7:00 pm		at Seattle	L 69–78	1–1	Showare Center (1,977); Kent, WA
November 19, 2018*; 6:00 pm, P12N		Cal Poly	W 84–70	2–1	Beasley Coliseum (1,774); Pullman, WA
November 24, 2018*; 7:30 pm, P12N		Delaware State	W 80–52	3–1	Beasley Coliseum (1,203); Pullman, WA
November 27, 2018*; 8:00 pm, P12N		Cal State Northridge	W 103–94	4–1	Beasley Coliseum (1,909); Pullman, WA
December 1, 2018*; 6:00 pm		at New Mexico State	L 63–69	4–2	Pan American Center (4,880); Las Cruces, NM
December 5, 2018*; 6:00 pm, P12N		Idaho; Battle of the Palouse	W 90–70	5–2	Beasley Coliseum (2,748); Pullman, WA
December 9, 2018*; 4:00 pm, P12N		vs. Montana State; Kennewick Showcase	L 90–95	5–3	Toyota Center (1,807); Kennewick, WA
December 17, 2018*; 7:00 pm, P12N		Rider; Las Vegas Classic campus game	W 94–80	6–3	Beasley Coliseum (1,673); Pullman, WA
December 19, 2018*; 7:30 pm, P12N		SIU Edwardsville; Las Vegas Classic campus game	W 89–73	7–3	Beasley Coliseum (1,776); Pullman, WA
December 22, 2018*; 4:30 pm, FS1		vs. San Diego; Las Vegas Classic semifinals	L 75–82	7–4	Orleans Arena; Paradise, NV
December 23, 2018*; 7:00 pm, FS1		vs. New Mexico State; Las Vegas Classic 3rd place game	L 72–75	7–5	Orleans Arena; Paradise, NV
December 29, 2018*; 11:00 am, P12N		vs. Santa Clara; Spokane Showcase	L 71–79	7–6	Spokane Arena (2,723); Spokane, WA
Pac-12 regular season
January 5, 2019; 7:30 pm, P12N		at Washington; Rivalry	L 67–85	7–7 (0–1)	Alaska Airlines Arena (8,029); Seattle, WA
January 10, 2019; 6:00 pm, P12N		at Colorado	L 60–92	7–8 (0–2)	CU Events Center (6,184); Boulder, CO
January 12, 2019; 5:30 pm, P12N		at Utah	L 70–88	7–9 (0–3)	Jon M. Huntsman Center (11,358); Salt Lake City, UT
January 17, 2019; 7:00 pm, P12N		California	W 82–59	8–9 (1–3)	Beasley Coliseum (2,130); Pullman, WA
January 19, 2019; 12:00 pm, P12N		Stanford	L 66–78	8–10 (1–4)	Beasley Coliseum (2,364); Pullman, WA
January 24, 2019; 8:00 pm, P12N		at Oregon State	L 77–90	8–11 (1–5)	Gill Coliseum (5,100); Corvallis, OR
January 27, 2019; 5:00 pm, ESPNU		at Oregon	L 58–78	8–12 (1–6)	Matthew Knight Arena (8,929); Eugene, OR
January 30, 2019; 7:30 pm, P12N		UCLA	L 67–87	8–13 (1–7)	Beasley Coliseum (2,497); Pullman, WA
February 2, 2019; 4:00 pm, P12N		USC	L 84–93	8–14 (1–8)	Beasley Coliseum (2,559); Pullman, WA
February 7, 2019; 5:30 pm, P12N		at Arizona State	W 91–70	9–14 (2–8)	Wells Fargo Arena (9,517); Tempe, AZ
February 9, 2019; 4:30 pm, P12N		at Arizona	W 69–55	10–14 (3–8)	McKale Center (14,145); Tucson, AZ
February 16, 2019; 5:30 pm, ESPNU		Washington; Rivalry	L 70–72	10–15 (3–9)	Beasley Coliseum (4,233); Pullman, WA
February 20, 2019; 7:00 pm, P12N		Colorado	W 76–74	11–15 (4–9)	Beasley Coliseum (1,911); Pullman, WA
February 23, 2019; 5:00 pm, P12N		Utah	L 79–92	11–16 (4–10)	Beasley Coliseum (3,199); Pullman, WA
February 28, 2019; 6:00 pm, P12N		at Stanford	L 50–98	11–17 (4–11)	Maples Pavilion (3,139); Stanford, CA
March 2, 2019; 4:00 pm, P12N		at California	L 69–76	11–18 (4–12)	Haas Pavilion (7,406); Berkeley, CA
March 6, 2019; 8:00 pm, FS1		Oregon	L 61–72	11–19 (4–13)	Beasley Coliseum (2,065); Pullman, WA
March 9, 2019; 12:00 pm, P12N		Oregon State	L 77–85	11–20 (4–14)	Beasley Coliseum (2,549); Pullman, WA
Pac-12 Tournament
March 13, 2019; 8:30 pm, P12N	(11)	vs. (6) Oregon; First round	L 51–84	11–21	T-Mobile Arena (8,876); Paradise, NV
*Non-conference game. ^{#}Rankings from AP Poll. (#) Tournament seedings in parentheses. All times are in Pacific Time.
