= 2019 Pac-12 Conference men's basketball tournament =

- Classification: Division I
- Season: 2018–19
- Teams: 12
- Site: T-Mobile Arena; Paradise, Nevada
- Champions: Oregon Ducks (5th title)
- Winning coach: Dana Altman (3rd title)
- MVP: Payton Pritchard (Oregon)
- Attendance: 69,024
- Top scorer: Louis King (Oregon) (66 points)
- Television: Pac-12 Network; ESPN

2018–19 Pac-12 Conference men's basketball standings
	Conf.				Overall
Team	W		L	PCT	W		L	PCT
Washington	15	–	3	.833	27	–	9	.750
Arizona State	12	–	6	.667	23	–	11	.676
Utah	11	–	7	.611	17	–	14	.548
Oregon State	10	–	8	.556	18	–	13	.581
Colorado	10	–	8	.556	23	–	13	.639
Oregon †	10	–	8	.556	25	–	13	.658
UCLA	9	–	9	.500	17	–	16	.515
USC	8	–	10	.444	16	–	17	.485
Arizona	8	–	10	.444	17	–	15	.531
Stanford	8	–	10	.444	15	–	16	.484
Washington State	4	–	14	.222	11	–	21	.344
California	3	–	15	.167	8	–	23	.258
† Pac-12 Conference tournament winner

The 2019 Pac-12 Conference men's basketball tournament presented by New York Life was a postseason men's basketball tournament for the Pac-12 Conference played from March 13–16, 2019, at T-Mobile Arena on the Las Vegas Strip in Paradise, Nevada. No. 6 seed Oregon Ducks upset No. 1 seed Washington 68–48 in the championship, receiving the conference's automatic bid to the 2019 NCAA tournament. Payton Pritchard of Oregon was named the tournament's Most Outstanding Player.

== Seeds ==
All 12 Pac-12 schools were eligible to participate in the tournament. Teams were seeded by conference record, with a tiebreaker system used to seed teams with identical conference records. As a result, the top four teams receive a bye to the quarterfinals of the tournament.

Tie-breaking procedures for determining all tournament seeding was:

- For two-team tie

1. Results of head-to-head competition during the regular season.

2. Each team's record (won-lost percentage) vs. the team occupying the highest position in the final regular standings, and then continuing down through the standings until one team gains an advantage. When arriving at another group of tied teams while comparing records, use each team's record (won-lost percentage) against the collective tied teams as a group (prior to that group's own tie-breaking procedure), rather than the performance against individual tied teams.

3. Won-lost percentage against all Division I opponents.

4. Coin toss conducted by the Commissioner or designee.

- For multiple-team tie

1. Results (won-lost percentage) of collective head-to-head competition during the regular season among the tied teams.

2. If more than two teams are still tied, each of the tied team's record (won-lost percentage) vs. the team occupying the highest position in the final regular season standings, and then continuing down through the standings, eliminating teams with inferior records, until one team gains an advantage.

When arriving at another group of tied teams while comparing records, use each team's record (won-lost percentage) against the collective tied teams as a group (prior to that group's own tie-breaking procedure), rather than the performance against individual tied teams.

After one team has an advantage and is seeded, all remaining teams in the multiple-team tie-breaker will repeat the multiple-team tie-breaking procedure.

If at any point the multiple-team tie is reduced to two teams, the two-team tie-breaking procedure will be applied.

3. Won-lost percentage against all Division I opponents.

4. Coin toss conducted by the Commissioner or designee.

Seed	School	Conference	Overall	Tiebreaker
1	Washington†#	15–3	24–7	
2	Arizona State#	12–6	21–9	
3	Utah#	11–7	17–13	
4	Oregon State#	10–8	18–12	1–0 vs. Colorado, 2–0 vs. Oregon
5	Colorado	10–8	19–11	0–1 vs. Oregon State, 1–0 vs. Oregon
6	Oregon	10–8	19–12	0–2 vs. Oregon State, 0–1 vs. Colorado
7	UCLA	9–9	16–15	
8	USC	8–10	15–16	1–0 vs. Arizona, 1–1 vs. Stanford
9	Arizona	8–10	17–14	2–0 vs. Stanford, 0–1 vs. USC
10	Stanford	8–10	15–15	1–1 vs. USC, 0–2 vs. Arizona
11	Washington State	4–14	11–20	
12	California	3–15	8–22	
† – Pac-12 Conference regular season champions # – Received a first round bye in the conference tournament.

== Schedule ==
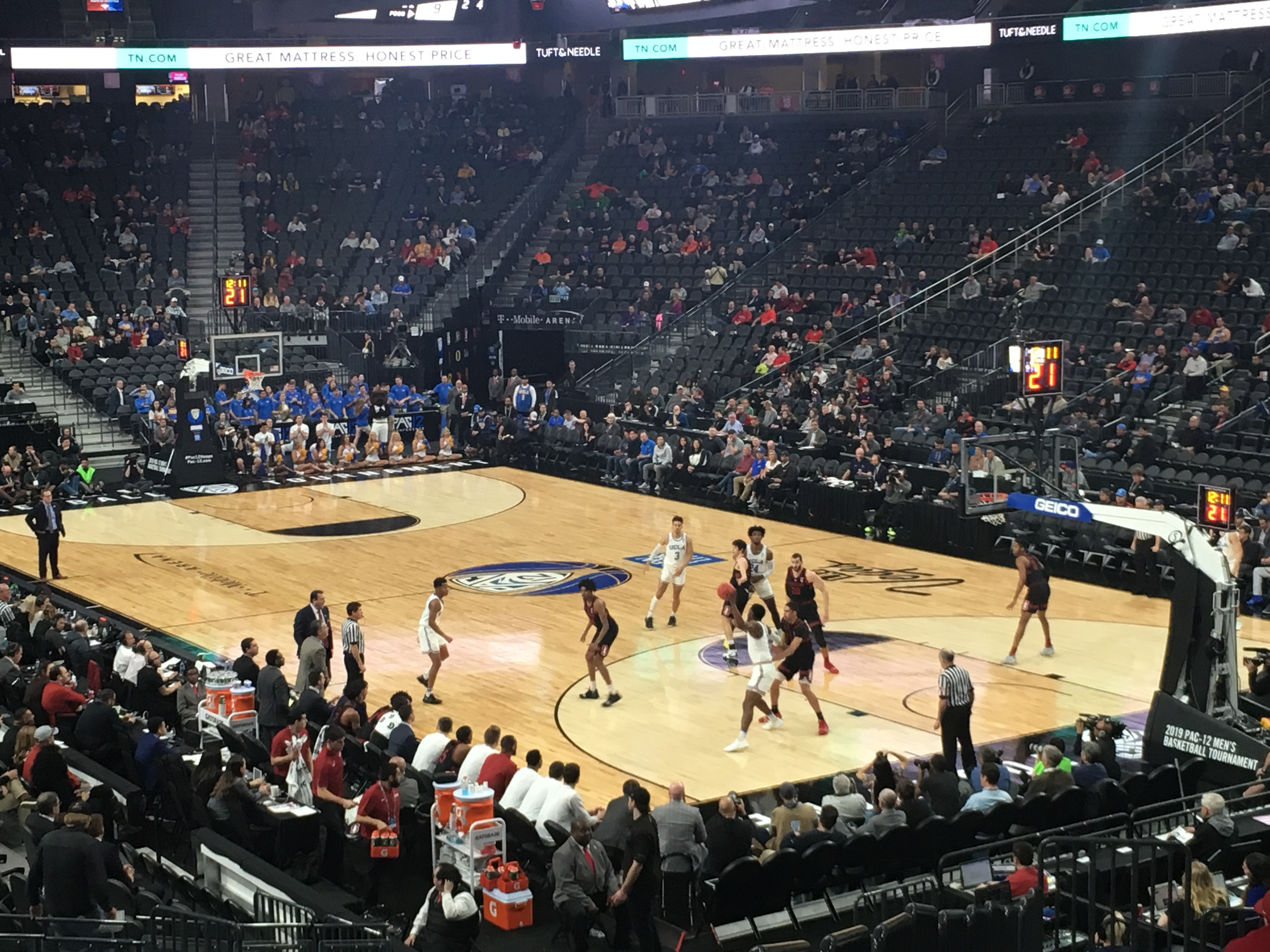
The UCLA Bruins played against the Stanford Cardinal in the first round of the tournament.

Game	Time	Matchup	Score	Television	Attendance
First round – Wednesday, March 13
1	12:00 pm	No. 8 USC vs. No. 9 Arizona	78−65	Pac-12 Network	9,748
2	2:30 pm	No. 5 Colorado vs. No. 12 California	56−51	Pac-12 Network	9,748
3	6:00 pm	No. 7 UCLA vs. No. 10 Stanford	79−72	Pac-12 Network	8,876
4	8:30 pm	No. 6 Oregon vs. No. 11 Washington State	84–51	Pac-12 Network	8,876
Quarterfinals – Thursday, March 14
5	12:00 pm	No. 1 Washington vs. No. 8 USC	78–75	Pac-12 Network	10,556
6	2:30 pm	No. 4 Oregon State vs. No. 5 Colorado	73–58	Pac-12 Network	10,556
7	6:00 pm	No. 2 Arizona State vs. No. 7 UCLA	83–72	Pac-12 Network	13,012
8	8:30 pm	No. 3 Utah vs. No. 6 Oregon	54–66	ESPN	13,012
Semifinals – Friday, March 15
9	6:00 pm	No. 1 Washington vs. No. 5 Colorado	66–61	Pac–12 Network	13,955
10	8:30 pm	No. 2 Arizona State vs. No. 6 Oregon	75−79^{OT}	ESPN	13,955
Championship – Saturday, March 16
11	7:30 pm	No. 1 Washington vs. No. 6 Oregon	48–68	ESPN	12,877
Game times in PT. Rankings denote tournament seed.

== Bracket ==
First round Wednesday, March 13
8	USC	78
9	Arizona	65
5	Colorado	56
12	California	51
7	UCLA	79
10	Stanford	72
6	Oregon	84
11	Washington State	51

Quarterfinals; Thursday, March 14
1	Washington	78
8	USC	75
4	Oregon State	58
5	Colorado	73
2	Arizona State	83
7	UCLA	72
3	Utah	54
6	Oregon	66

Semifinals; Friday, March 15
1	Washington	66
5	Colorado	61
2	Arizona State	75
6	Oregon	79*

Championship; Saturday, March 16
1	Washington	48
6	Oregon	68

* denotes overtime period

== Game statistics ==
=== First round ===
Pac-12 Network

March 13
12:00 pm PST

No. 8 USC 78, No. 9 Arizona 65
Scoring by half: 40−40, 38−25
Pts: Bennie Boatwright, 22; Rebs: Bennie Boatwright, 11; Asts: Bennie Boatwright, 4	Pts: Ryan Luther, 16; Rebs: Chase Jeter, 7 Asts: Justin Coleman, 3

T-Mobile Arena
Paradise, NV
Attendance: 9,748
Referees: Randy McCall, Mike Greenstein, Eric Curry

Pac-12 Network

March 13
2:30 pm PST

No. 5 Colorado 56, No. 12 California 51
Scoring by half: 28−22, 28−29
Pts: McKinley Wright IV, 18; Rebs: Tyler Bey, 11; Asts: McKinley Wright IV, 3	Pts: Matt Bradley, 17; Rebs: Matt Bradley, 5 Asts: Justice Sueing, 3

T-Mobile Arena
Paradise, NV
Attendance: 9,748
Referees: Chris Rastatter, Deldre Carr, Nate Harris

Pac-12 Network

March 13
6:00 pm PST

No. 7 UCLA 79, No. 10 Stanford 72
Scoring by half: 36−22, 43−50
Pts: Jaylen Hands, 22; Rebs: Jaylen Hands, 11; Asts: 2 Tied, 3	Pts: 2 Tied, 18; Rebs: Josh Sharma, 13; Asts: Bryce Wills, 4

T-Mobile Arena
Paradise, NV
Attendance: 8,876
Referees: Tony Padilla, Larry Spaulding, Bob Staffen

Pac-12 Network

March 13
8:30 pm PST

No. 6 Oregon 84, No. 11 Washington State 51
Scoring by half: 37−20, 47−31
Pts: Ehab Amin, 17; Rebs: Francis Okoro, 8 Asts: Will Richardson, 5	Pts: 2 Tied, 9 Rebs: C. J. Elleby, 9 Asts: Robert Franks, 4

T-Mobile Arena
Paradise, NV
Attendance: 8,876
Referees: Verne Harris, Mike Scyphers, Deron White

=== Quarterfinals ===
Pac-12 Network

March 14
12:00 pm PST

No. 1 Washington 78, No. 8 USC 75
Scoring by half: 43–38, 35–37
Pts: Jaylen Nowell, 24; Rebs: Noah Dickerson, 11; Asts: David Crisp, 6	Pts: 3 Tied, 17; Rebs: Nick Rakocevic, 17; Asts: Bennie Boatwright, 7

T-Mobile Arena
Paradise, NV
Attendance: 10,556
Referees: Tony Padilla, Mike Scyphers, Glen Mayberry

Pac-12 Network

March 14
2:30 pm PST

No. 4 Oregon State 58, No. 5 Colorado 73
Scoring by half: 18−37, 40−36
Pts: Tres Tinkle, 23; Rebs: Ethan Thompson, 7 Asts: 2 tied, 2	Pts: McKinley Wright IV, 17; Rebs: Evan Battey, 9 Asts: McKinley Wright IV, 6

T-Mobile Arena
Paradise, NV
Attendance: 10,556
Referees: Greg Nixon, Michael Irving, Nate Harris

Pac-12 Network

March 14
6:00 pm PST

No. 2 Arizona State 83, No. 7 UCLA 72
Scoring by half: 45−29, 38−43
Pts: Kris Wilkes, 25; Rebs: Jalen Hill, 8 Asts: Jaylen Hands, 4	Pts: Romello White, 19; Rebs: Zylan Cheatham, 13; Asts: Remy Martin, 6

T-Mobile Arena
Paradise, NV
Attendance: 13,012
Referees: David Hall, Mike Greenstein, Deldre Carr

ESPN

March 14
8:30 pm PST

No. 3 Utah 54, No. 6 Oregon 66
Scoring by half: 24−18, 30−48
Pts: Donnie Tillman, 18; Rebs: Jayce Johnson, 12; Asts: Sedrick Barefield, 3	Pts: 2 Tied, 20; Rebs: Louis King, 7 Asts: Payton Pritchard, 5

T-Mobile Arena
Paradise, NV
Attendance: 13,012
Referees: Mike Reed, Tommy Nunez Jr, Frank Harvey III

=== Semifinals ===
Pac-12 Network

March 15
6:00 pm PST

No. 1 Washington 66, No. 5 Colorado 61
Scoring by half: 27−33, 38−29
Pts: 2 Tied, 14; Rebs: Noah Dickerson, 11; Asts: Jaylen Nowell, 4	Pts: Tyler Bey, 22; Rebs: Tyler Bey, 16; Asts: McKinley Wright IV, 4

T-Mobile Arena
Paradise, NV
Attendance: 13,955
Referees: Verne Harris, Chris Rastatter, Tommy Nunez Jr

ESPN

March 15
8:30 pm PST

No. 2 Arizona State 75, No. 6 Oregon 79 (OT)
Scoring by half: 35−28, 32−39 Overtime: 12−8
Pts: Luguentz Dort, 16; Rebs: Zylan Cheatham, 9 Asts: 2 Tied, 3	Pts: Louis King, 19; Rebs: 2 Tied, 7 Asts: Payton Pritchard, 8

T-Mobile Arena
Paradise, NV
Attendance: 13,955
Referees: Randy McCall, Greg Nixon, Kevin Brill

=== Championship ===
ESPN

March 16
7:30 pm PST

No. 1 Washington 48, No. 6 Oregon 68
Scoring by half: 26–28, 22–40
Pts: Jaylen Nowell, 8 Rebs: Noah Dickerson, 6 Asts: David Crisp, 6	Pts: Payton Pritchard, 20; Rebs: Kenny Wooten, 7 Asts: Payton Pritchard, 7

T-Mobile Arena
Paradise, NV
Attendance: 12,877
Referees: Michael Reed, Tony Padilla, David Hall

== Awards and honors ==
=== Team and tournament leaders ===
Team	Points		Rebounds		Assists		Steals		Blocks		Minutes	
Arizona	Ryan Luther	16	Chase Jeter	7	Justin Coleman	3	Dylan Smith	2	Dylan Smith	3	Brandon Williams	29
Arizona State	Rob Edwards	30	Zylan Cheatham	22	Remy Martin	8	3 Tied	3	Romello White	5	Luguentz Dort	72
California	Matt Bradley	17	Matt Bradley	5	Justice Sueing	3	Matt Bradley	4	Connor Vanover	3	Darius McNeill	38
Colorado	McKinley Wright IV	40	Evan Battey	35	McKinley Wright IV	11	Shane Gatling	5	Tyler Bey	4	McKinley Wright IV	110
Oregon	Louis King	66	Louis King	24	Payton Pritchard	22	Payton Pritchard	7	Kenny Wooten	10	Payton Pritchard	138
Oregon State	Tres Tinkle	23	Ethan Thompson	7	2 Tied	2	Tres Tinkle	3	Kylor Kelley	2	Ethan Thompson	39
Stanford	Josh Sharma	18	Josh Sharma	13	Bryce Wills	4	Bryce Wills	3	Josh Sharma	4	Josh Sharma	36
UCLA	Jaylen Hands	43	Jalen Hill	18	Jaylen Hands	7	Jaylen Hands	3	Moses Brown	2	Jaylen Hands	74
USC	Bennie Boatwright	38	Nick Rakocevic	19	Bennie Boatwright	11	Derryck Thornton	6	Nick Rakocevic	4	Bennie Boatwright	74
Utah	Donnie Tillman	18	Jayce Johnson	12	Sedrick Barefield	3	Parker Van Dyke	2	Jayce Johnson	4	2 Tied	36
Washington	Jaylen Nowell	46	Noah Dickerson	28	David Crisp	15	Matisse Thybulle	7	2 Tied	5	Jaylen Nowell	107
Washington State	Robert Franks	8	CJ Elleby	9	Robert Franks	4	2 Tied	2	CJ Elleby	1	CJ Elleby	39

=== All-Tournament Team ===
Name	Pos.	Height	Weight	Year	Team
Zylan Cheatham	F	6'8"	220	RS Sr.	Arizona State
Louis King	F	6'9"	205	Fr.	Oregon
Jaylen Nowell	G	6'4"	200	Fr.	Washington
Payton Pritchard	G	6'2"	195	Jr.	Oregon
Matisse Thybulle	G	6'5"	205	Sr.	Washington
McKinley Wright IV	G	6'0"	195	So.	Colorado

=== Most Outstanding Player ===
Name	Pos.	Height	Weight	Year	Team
Payton Pritchard	G	6'2"	195	Jr.	Oregon

== Tournament notes ==
- Tournament winner Oregon was awarded the automatic bid to the 2019 NCAA Division I men's basketball tournament and was the 12 seed in the South Regional. They lost in the regional semi-finals to the 1 seed and eventual national champion, Virginia.
- Regular season winner Washington gained an at-large bid to the 2019 tournament as a 9 seed in the Midwest
- Arizona State received an at-large bid in the First Four as an 11 seed in the West.

== Hall of Honor ==
The 2019 class of the Pac-12 Hall of Honor, honored on March 15 during a ceremony prior to the tournament semifinals, included Meg Ritchie-Stone (Arizona), Frank Kush (Arizona State), Natalie Coughlin (California), Lisa Van Goor (Colorado), Bev Smith (Oregon), Dick Fosbury (Oregon State), Dick Gould (Stanford), Ann Meyers Drysdale (UCLA), Ronnie Lott (USC), Steve Smith Sr. (Utah), Trish Bostrom (Washington), and John Olerud (Washington State).

== See also ==
- 2019 Pac-12 Conference women's basketball tournament
