= 2018–19 Oregon State Beavers men's basketball team =

American college basketball season

2018–19 Oregon State Beavers men's basketball
- Conference: Pac-12 Conference
- Record: 18–13 (10–8 Pac-12)
- Head coach: Wayne Tinkle (5th season)
- Associate head coach: Kerry Rupp (5th season)
- Assistant coaches: Gregg Gottlieb (5th season); Stephen Thompson (5th season)
- Home arena: Gill Coliseum

2018–19 Pac-12 Conference men's basketball standings
	Conf.				Overall
Team	W		L	PCT	W		L	PCT
Washington	15	–	3	.833	27	–	9	.750
Arizona State	12	–	6	.667	23	–	11	.676
Utah	11	–	7	.611	17	–	14	.548
Oregon State	10	–	8	.556	18	–	13	.581
Colorado	10	–	8	.556	23	–	13	.639
Oregon †	10	–	8	.556	25	–	13	.658
UCLA	9	–	9	.500	17	–	16	.515
USC	8	–	10	.444	16	–	17	.485
Arizona	8	–	10	.444	17	–	15	.531
Stanford	8	–	10	.444	15	–	16	.484
Washington State	4	–	14	.222	11	–	21	.344
California	3	–	15	.167	8	–	23	.258
† Pac-12 Conference tournament winner

The 2018–19 Oregon State Beavers men's basketball team represented Oregon State University in the 2018–19 NCAA Division I men's basketball season. The Beavers, led by fifth-year head coach Wayne Tinkle, played their home games at Gill Coliseum in Corvallis, Oregon as members of the Pac-12 Conference. They finished the season 18–13, 10–8 in Pac-12 play to finish in a three-way tie for fourth place. They lost in the quarterfinals of the Pac-12 tournament to Colorado. Despite having 18 wins and a winning conference record, they failed to get an invitation to the National Invitation Tournament, and were also ruled out of the College Basketball Invitational.

== Previous season ==
The 2017–18 Beavers finished the 2017–18 season 16–16, 7–11 in Pac-12 play to finish in tenth place. They defeated Washington in the first round of the Pac-12 tournament before losing in the quarterfinals to USC.

== Off-season ==
=== Departures ===
Name	Num	Pos.	Height	Weight	Year	Hometown	Reason for departure
JaQuori McLaughlin	0	G	6'4"	185	Sophomore	Tacoma, WA	Transferred to UC Santa Barbara
Ronnie Stacy	2	G	6'4"	200	Senior	Alexander City, AL	Graduated
Drew Eubanks	12	F/C	6'10"	250	Junior	Troutdale, OR	Declared for 2018 NBA draft
Tanner Sanders	15	G	6'5"	210	RS junior	Corvallis, OR	Left team
Xavier Smith	22	G	6'4"	180	Freshman	Seattle, WA	Transferred to Idaho
Kendal Manuel	24	G	6'4"	190	RS sophomore	Billings, MT	Transferred to Montana
Cheikh N'diaye	31	C	7'0"	240	RS senior	Dakar, Senegal	Graduated
Seth Berger	32	F	6'8"	215	RS senior	Seattle, WA	Graduated
Ben Koné	34	F	6'8"	235	Sophomore	San Jose, CA	Transferred

=== Incoming transfers ===
Name	Num	Pos.	Height	Weight	Year	Hometown	Previous school
Payton Dastrup	15	C	6'10"	250	Junior	Mesa, AZ	BYU
Kylor Kelley	24	F	7'0"	205	RS Junior	Gervais, OR	Lane CC

=== 2018 recruiting class ===
College recruiting
Name	Hometown	School	Height	Weight	Commit date
Jack Wilson #15 C	San Mateo, CA	Junipero Serra High School	6 ft 11 in (2.11 m)	N/A	Oct 22, 2016
Jack Wilson #15 C	Recruit ratings: Scout: Rivals: 247Sports: ESPN: (81)				
Warren Washington #22 PF	Escondido, CA	Mission Hills High School	6 ft 11 in (2.11 m)	215 lb (98 kg)	Oct 5, 2017
Warren Washington #22 PF	Recruit ratings: Scout: Rivals: 247Sports: ESPN: (75)				
Antoine Vernon; PG	Hamilton, ON	The RISE Centre Academy	5 ft 10 in (1.78 m)	N/A	
Antoine Vernon; PG	Recruit ratings: No ratings found				
Jordan Campbell #81 SG	Victorville, CA	Scale Prep	6 ft 2 in (1.88 m)	160 lb (73 kg)	May 1, 2018
Jordan Campbell #81 SG	Recruit ratings: Scout: Rivals: 247Sports: ESPN: (63)				
Overall recruit ranking:
Note: In many cases, Scout, Rivals, 247Sports, On3, and ESPN may conflict in their listings of height and weight.; In these cases, the average was taken. ESPN grades are on a 100-point scale.; Sources:

=== 2019 recruiting class ===
College recruiting (2019)
Name	Hometown	School	Height	Weight	Commit date
Julien Franklin; SG	Villa Park, CA	Villa Park High School	6 ft 4 in (1.93 m)	160 lb (73 kg)	Jan 6, 2018
Julien Franklin; SG	Recruit ratings: Scout: Rivals: 247Sports: ESPN: (NR)				
Overall recruit ranking:
Note: In many cases, Scout, Rivals, 247Sports, On3, and ESPN may conflict in their listings of height and weight.; In these cases, the average was taken. ESPN grades are on a 100-point scale.; Sources:

== Roster ==
2018–19 Oregon State Beavers men's basketball team
Players
Coaches

Pos.	#	Name	Height	Weight	Year	Previous school	Hometown
G	0	Jordan Campbell	6 ft 3 in (1.91 m)	195 lb (88 kg)	Fr	Adelanto HS	Adelanto, California
G	1	Stephen Thompson Jr.	6 ft 4 in (1.93 m)	190 lb (86 kg)	Sr	Bishop Montgomery HS	Los Angeles, California
G	2	Kye Blaser	6 ft 3 in (1.91 m)	180 lb (82 kg)	Fr	Newport HS	Newport, Oregon
F	3	Tres Tinkle	6 ft 8 in (2.03 m)	225 lb (102 kg)	RS Jr	Hellgate HS	Missoula, Montana
F	4	Alfred Hollins	6 ft 6 in (1.98 m)	195 lb (88 kg)	So	Hillcrest Prep	San Francisco, California
G	5	Ethan Thompson	6 ft 5 in (1.96 m)	190 lb (86 kg)	So	Bishop Montgomery HS	Los Angeles, California
G	11	Zach Reichle	6 ft 5 in (1.96 m)	205 lb (93 kg)	So	Wilsonville HS	Wilsonville, Oregon
G	13	Antoine Vernon	6 ft 0 in (1.83 m)	175 lb (79 kg)	Fr	The Rise Centre Academy	Hamilton, Ontario
C	14	Jack Wilson	7 ft 0 in (2.13 m)	255 lb (116 kg)	Fr	Junípero Serra HS	Half Moon Bay, California
C	15	Payton Dastrup (redshirt)	6 ft 10 in (2.08 m)	250 lb (113 kg)	Jr	BYU	Mesa, AZ
F	22	Warren Washington	6 ft 11 in (2.11 m)	210 lb (95 kg)	Fr	Mission Hills HS	San Marcos, California
C	23	Gligorije Rakocevic	6 ft 11 in (2.11 m)	255 lb (116 kg)	Sr	Cantwell-Sacred Heart of Mary HS	Bijelo Polje, Montenegro
F	24	Kylor Kelley	7 ft 0 in (2.13 m)	215 lb (98 kg)	RS Jr	Lane CC	Gervais, Oregon
F	44	Isaac Barnes (W)	6 ft 8 in (2.03 m)	225 lb (102 kg)	So	North Allegheny HS	Pittsburgh, Pennsylvania

Head coach

- Wayne Tinkle (Montana)

Assistant coach(es)

- Kerry Rupp (Southern Utah)
- Gregg Gottlieb (UCLA)
- Stephen Thompson (Syracuse)

Legend

- (C) Team captain
- (S) Suspended
- (I) Ineligible
- (W) Walk-on
- Injured
- Current redshirt

Roster

== Schedule and results ==
Date time, TV	Rank^{#}	Opponent^{#}	Result	Record	High points	High rebounds	High assists	Site (attendance) city, state
Exhibition
October 27, 2018*; 7:00 pm		Montana Tech	W 103–51	–	20 – Tied	7 – Tied	5 – Tied	Gill Coliseum (3,653); Corvallis, OR
Non-conference regular season
November 6, 2018*; 6:00 pm, P12N		UC Riverside	W 72–59	1–0	19 – Tinkle	8 – Tinkle	7 – Tinkle	Gill Coliseum (3,590); Corvallis, OR
November 10, 2018*; 12:00 pm, P12N		Wyoming	W 83–64	2–0	28 – Tinkle	11 – Tinkle	5 – Tinkle	Gill Coliseum (3,931); Corvallis, OR
November 16, 2018*; 10:00 am, FloSports		vs. Old Dominion; Paradise Jam quarterfinals	W 61–56	3–0	17 – Thompson Jr.	12 – Tinkle	5 – Tinkle	Sports and Fitness Center (522); St. Thomas, VI
November 18, 2018*; 2:30 pm, FloSports		vs. Missouri; Paradise Jam semifinals	L 63–69	3–1	17 – Tinkle	10 – Tinkle	6 – Tinkle	Sports and Fitness Center; St. Thomas, VI
November 19, 2018*; 2:30 pm, FloSports		vs. Penn; Paradise Jam 3rd place game	W 74–58	4–1	32 – Tinkle	12 – Tinkle	6 – Thompson Jr.	Sports and Fitness Center; St. Thomas, VI
November 25, 2018*; 2:00 pm		at Long Beach State	W 75–72	5–1	18 – Thompson	9 – Tinkle	4 – Tinkle	Walter Pyramid (2,082); Long Beach, CA
December 1, 2018*; 4:00 pm, P12N		Missouri State	W 101–77	6–1	25 – Thompson Jr.	9 – Thompson	7 – Hollins	Gill Coliseum (4,369); Corvallis, OR
December 9, 2018*; 12:30 pm, ESPNU		at Saint Louis	L 61–65	6–2	22 – Thompson	11 – Thompson	5 – Thompson Jr.	Chaifetz Arena (6,853); St. Louis, MO
December 15, 2018*; 8:00 pm, P12N		vs. Texas A&M; Dam City Classic	L 64–67	6–3	20 – Thompson	10 – Hollins	2 – Tied	Moda Center (5,802); Portland, OR
December 17, 2018*; 7:00 pm, P12N		Pepperdine	W 82–67	7–3	21 – Tinkle	9 – Kelley	7 – Tinkle	Gill Coliseum (3,534); Corvallis, OR
December 21, 2018*; 12:00 pm, P12N		Kent State	L 63–66	7–4	20 – Tinkle	9 – Kelley	4 – Thompson	Gill Coliseum (4,587); Corvallis, OR
December 29, 2018*; 5:00 pm, P12N		Central Connecticut	W 80–59	8–4	20 – Tinkle	8 – Tied	4 – Thompson Jr.	Gill Coliseum (4,210); Corvallis, OR
Pac-12 regular season
January 5, 2019; 5:00 pm, P12N		at Oregon; Civil War	W 77–72	9–4 (1–0)	28 – Tinkle	8 – Tied	6 – Thompson Jr.	Matthew Knight Arena (11,204); Eugene, OR
January 10, 2019; 8:00 pm, ESPNU		USC	W 79–74 ^{OT}	10–4 (2–0)	34 – Thompson Jr.	10 – Thompson Jr.	5 – Thompson Jr.	Gill Coliseum (4,935); Corvallis, OR
January 13, 2019; 7:30 pm, FS1		UCLA	W 79–66	11–4 (3–0)	17 – Tied	6 – Tied	6 – Tied	Gill Coliseum (5,853); Corvallis, OR
January 17, 2019; 7:00 pm, FS1		at Arizona State	L 67–70	11–5 (3–1)	21 – Tied	7 – Tinkle	6 – Tinkle	Wells Fargo Arena (9,705); Tempe, AZ
January 19, 2019; 4:00 pm, P12N		at Arizona	L 71–82	11–6 (3–2)	25 – Tinkle	10 – Tinkle	4 – Tied	McKale Center (14,410); Tucson, AZ
January 24, 2019; 8:00 pm, P12N		Washington State	W 90–77	12–6 (4–2)	22 – Thompson Jr.	7 – Kelley	7 – Thompson Jr.	Gill Coliseum (5,100); Corvallis, OR
January 26, 2019; 1:00 pm, P12N		Washington	L 69–79	12–7 (4–3)	30 – Thompson Jr.	9 – Tinkle	6 – Thompson	Gill Coliseum (6,462); Corvallis, OR
January 31, 2019; 6:00 pm, P12N		at Colorado	W 76–74	13–7 (5–3)	21 – Thompson Jr.	8 – Tinkle	4 – Thompson Jr.	CU Events Center (6,839); Boulder, CO
February 2, 2019; 2:00 pm, P12N		at Utah	W 81–72	14–7 (6–3)	31 – Tinkle	7 – Thompson Jr.	4 – Tinkle	Jon M. Huntsman Center (11,884); Salt Lake City, UT
February 7, 2019; 7:00 pm, P12N		Stanford	L 60–83	14–8 (6–4)	16 – Tinkle	6 – Thompson	5 – Thompson	Gill Coliseum (4,293); Corvallis, OR
February 9, 2019; 2:30 pm, P12N		California	W 79–71	15–8 (7–4)	21 – Thompson Jr.	7 – Thompson	6 – Thompson Jr.	Gill Coliseum (5,122); Corvallis, OR
February 16, 2019; 7:30 pm, P12N		Oregon; Civil War	W 72–57	16–8 (8–4)	21 – Thompson Jr.	6 – Tinkle	7 – Tinkle	Gill Coliseum (9,301); Corvallis, OR
February 21, 2019; 8:00 pm, FS1		at UCLA	L 67–68	16–9 (8–5)	21 – Thompson Jr.	16 – Tinkle	7 – Thompson Jr.	Pauley Pavilion (6,944); Los Angeles, CA
February 23, 2019; 3:00 pm, P12N		at USC	W 67–62	17–9 (9–5)	15 – Tied	13 – Tinkle	7 – Tinkle	Galen Center (4,772); Los Angeles, CA
February 28, 2019; 6:00 pm, FS1		Arizona	L 72–74	17–10 (9–6)	24 – Tinkle	5 – Tinkle	5 – Thompson	Gill Coliseum (5,468); Corvallis, OR
March 3, 2019; 5:00 pm, ESPNU		Arizona State	L 71–74	17–11 (9–7)	24 – Tinkle	13 – Thompson	9 – Thompson	Gill Coliseum (6,023); Corvallis, OR
March 6, 2019; 7:00 pm, P12N		at Washington	L 76–81 ^{OT}	17–12 (9–8)	31 – Tinkle	10 – Tinkle	5 – Thompson	Alaska Airlines Arena (9,863); Seattle, WA
March 9, 2019; 12:00 pm, P12N		at Washington State	W 85–77	18–12 (10–8)	26 – Tied	12 – Tinkle	11 – Thompson	Beasley Coliseum (2,549); Pullman, WA
Pac-12 tournament
March 14, 2019; 2:30 pm, P12N	(4)	vs. (5) Colorado; Quarterfinals	L 58–73	18–13	23 – Tinkle	7 – Thompson	2 – Tied	T-Mobile Arena (10,556); Paradise, NV
*Non-conference game. ^{#}Rankings from AP Poll. (#) Tournament seedings in parentheses. All times are in Pacific Time.
