= 2018–19 Oregon Ducks men's basketball team =

American college basketball season

2018–19 Oregon Ducks men's basketball

Pac-12 tournament champions

NCAA tournament, Sweet Sixteen
- Conference: Pac-12 Conference

Ranking
- Coaches: No. 21
- Record: 25–13 (10–8 Pac-12)
- Head coach: Dana Altman (9th season)
- Assistant coaches: Kevin McKenna; Tony Stubblefield; Mike Mennenga
- Home arena: Matthew Knight Arena

2018–19 Pac-12 Conference men's basketball standings
	Conf.				Overall
Team	W		L	PCT	W		L	PCT
Washington	15	–	3	.833	27	–	9	.750
Arizona State	12	–	6	.667	23	–	11	.676
Utah	11	–	7	.611	17	–	14	.548
Oregon State	10	–	8	.556	18	–	13	.581
Colorado	10	–	8	.556	23	–	13	.639
Oregon †	10	–	8	.556	25	–	13	.658
UCLA	9	–	9	.500	17	–	16	.515
USC	8	–	10	.444	16	–	17	.485
Arizona	8	–	10	.444	17	–	15	.531
Stanford	8	–	10	.444	15	–	16	.484
Washington State	4	–	14	.222	11	–	21	.344
California	3	–	15	.167	8	–	23	.258
† Pac-12 Conference tournament winner

The 2018–19 Oregon Ducks men's basketball team represented the University of Oregon during the 2018–19 NCAA Division I men's basketball season. The Ducks, led by ninth-year head coach Dana Altman, played their home games at Matthew Knight Arena as members of the Pac–12 Conference. They finished the season with a 25–13 record, 10–8 in conference play, and finished tied for 4th in the Pac-12. Oregon won the Pac-12 tournament, upsetting the No. 1 seed Washington and receiving the conference's automatic bid to the NCAA tournament. Oregon entered the NCAA Tournament as a No. 12 seed and upset the No. 5 seed Wisconsin in the first round, beat UC Irvine in the Second Round before losing in the Sweet Sixteen to Virginia.

== Previous season ==
The Ducks finished the season 23–13, 10–8 in Pac-12 play to finish in a tie for sixth place. As the No. 6 seed in the Pac-12 tournament, they defeated Washington State in the first round and Utah in the quarterfinals before being defeated by USC in the semifinals. They received an invitation to the National Invitation Tournament, where they defeated Rider in the first round before losing to Marquette in the second round.

== Off-season ==
=== Departures ===
Name	Pos.	Height	Weight	Year	Hometown	Reason for departure
MiKyle McIntosh	F	6'7"	240	GS	Pickering, Ontario	Completed athletic eligibility
Elijah Brown	G	6'4"	200	GS	Orange County, California	Completed athletic eligibility
Evan Gross	G	5'10"	165	RS Sr.	Sacramento, California	Graduated
Roman Sorkin	F	6'10"	230	Sr.	Ashdod, Israel	Graduated
Keith Smith	F	6'7"	215	So.	Seattle, Washington	Transferred
M. J. Cage	F	6'10"	225	RS Fr.	Santa Ana, California	Transferred
Troy Brown Jr.	F	6'7"	215	Fr.	Las Vegas, Nevada	Declared for 2018 NBA draft

=== Incoming transfers ===
Name	Pos.	Height	Weight	Year	Hometown	Notes
Ehab Amin	G	6'4"	200	GS	Alexandria, Egypt	Graduate transfer from Texas A&M Corpus Christi. Amin is eligible to play immediately under NCAA transfer rules.

=== 2018 recruiting class ===
College recruiting information
Name	Hometown	School	Height	Weight	Commit date
Miles Norris; PF	San Diego, CA	Brewster Academy	6 ft 10 in (2.08 m)	190 lb (86 kg)	May 10, 2017
Miles Norris; PF	Recruit ratings: Scout: Rivals: 247Sports: ESPN: (87)				
Louis King; SF	Columbus, NJ	Hudson Catholic Regional HS	6 ft 8 in (2.03 m)	195 lb (88 kg)	Sep 21, 2017
Louis King; SF	Recruit ratings: Scout: Rivals: 247Sports: ESPN: (91)				
Will Richardson; PG	Hinesville, GA	Oak Hill Academy	6 ft 4 in (1.93 m)	170 lb (77 kg)	Nov 16, 2017
Will Richardson; PG	Recruit ratings: Scout: Rivals: 247Sports: ESPN: (88)				
Bol Bol; C	Olathe, Kansas	Findlay Prep (NV)	7 ft 1 in (2.16 m)	225 lb (102 kg)	Nov 20, 2017
Bol Bol; C	Recruit ratings: Scout: Rivals: 247Sports: ESPN: (95)				
Francis Okoro; C	Normal, IL	Normal Community West	6 ft 9 in (2.06 m)	225 lb (102 kg)	May 14, 2018
Francis Okoro; C	Recruit ratings: Scout: Rivals: 247Sports: ESPN: (85)				
Overall recruit ranking:
Note: In many cases, Scout, Rivals, 247Sports, On3, and ESPN may conflict in their listings of height and weight.; In these cases, the average was taken. ESPN grades are on a 100-point scale.; Sources:

== Roster ==
2018–19 Oregon Ducks men's basketball team
Players
Coaches

Pos.	#	Name	Height	Weight	Year	Previous school	Hometown
G	0	Will Richardson	6 ft 5 in (1.96 m)	180 lb (82 kg)	Fr	Oak Hill Academy	Hinesville, Georgia
C	1	Bol Bol (injured)	7 ft 2 in (2.18 m)	235 lb (107 kg)	Fr	Findlay Prep	Olathe, Kansas
F	2	Louis King	6 ft 9 in (2.06 m)	205 lb (93 kg)	Fr	Hudson Catholic HS	Jersey City, New Jersey
G	3	Payton Pritchard	6 ft 2 in (1.88 m)	195 lb (88 kg)	Jr	West Linn HS	West Linn, Oregon
G	4	Ehab Amin	6 ft 4 in (1.93 m)	200 lb (91 kg)	GS	Texas A&M–Corpus Christi	Alexandria, Egypt
F	5	Miles Norris	6 ft 10 in (2.08 m)	210 lb (95 kg)	Fr	Brewster Academy	San Diego, California
G	10	Victor Bailey Jr.	6 ft 4 in (1.93 m)	190 lb (86 kg)	So	McNeil HS	Austin, Texas
F	13	Paul White	6 ft 9 in (2.06 m)	230 lb (104 kg)	RS Sr	Georgetown	Chicago, Illinois
F	14	Kenny Wooten	6 ft 9 in (2.06 m)	235 lb (107 kg)	So	Trinity International	Manteca, California
G	25	Luke Osborn (W)	6 ft 6 in (1.98 m)	215 lb (98 kg)	RS So	Tualatin HS	Clackamas, Oregon
C	33	Francis Okoro	6 ft 9 in (2.06 m)	235 lb (107 kg)	Fr	Normal Community West HS	Imo, Nigeria
G	54	Will Johnson	6 ft 1 in (1.85 m)	180 lb (82 kg)	RS Fr	Palisades HS	Pacific Palisades, California

Head coach

- Dana Altman (Eastern New Mexico)

Assistant coach(es)

- Kevin McKenna (Creighton)
- Tony Stubblefield (Omaha)
- Mike Mennenga (Morehead State)

Legend

- (C) Team captain
- (S) Suspended
- (I) Ineligible
- (W) Walk-on
- Injured
- Current redshirt

Roster
Last update: January 6, 2018

- Jan. 2, 2019 - Sophomore Forward, Abu Kigab elected to transfer.
- Jan. 3, 2019 - Freshman Center, Bol Bol out for remainder of season with a left foot injury.

== Schedule and results ==
Date time, TV	Rank^{#}	Opponent^{#}	Result	Record	High points	High rebounds	High assists	Site (attendance) city, state
Exhibition
November 1, 2018*; 7:00 pm, P12N	No. 14	Western Oregon	W 77–58		19 – Bol	10 – Okoro	4 – Tied	Matthew Knight Arena (7,697); Eugene, OR
Non-conference regular season
November 6, 2018*; 8:00 pm, P12N	No. 14	Portland State	W 84–57	1–0	22 – Pritchard	12 – Bol	3 – Pritchard	Matthew Knight Arena (8,212); Eugene, OR
November 9, 2018*; 6:00 pm, P12N	No. 14	Eastern Washington; 2K Classic campus-site game	W 81–47	2–0	23 – Bol	12 – Bol	8 – Pritchard	Matthew Knight Arena (8,009); Eugene, OR
November 15, 2018*; 6:30 pm, ESPN2	No. 13	vs. Iowa; 2K Classic semifinals	L 69–77	2–1	25 – Amin	9 – Bol	5 – Pritchard	Madison Square Garden (14,417); New York, NY
November 16, 2018*; 1:30 pm, ESPN2	No. 13	vs. No. 15 Syracuse; 2K Classic 3rd place game	W 80–65	3–1	26 – Bol	9 – Bol	4 – Amin	Madison Square Garden (10,909); New York, NY
November 20, 2018*; 7:00 pm, P12N	No. 21	Green Bay; 2K Classic campus-site game	W 83–72	4–1	21 – Bol	9 – Bol	5 – Pritchard	Matthew Knight Arena (6,569); Eugene, OR
November 26, 2018*; 8:00 pm, P12N	No. 18	Texas Southern	L 84–89	4–2	32 – Bol	11 – Bol	7 – Pritchard	Matthew Knight Arena (6,926); Eugene, OR
December 1, 2018*; 6:00 pm, ESPN2	No. 18	at Houston	L 61–65	4–3	23 – Bol	7 – Tied	5 – Richardson	Fertitta Center (7,035); Houston, TX
December 8, 2018*; 5:00 pm, P12N		Omaha	W 84–61	5–3	20 – Wooten	10 – Bol	7 – Pritchard	Matthew Knight Arena (8,052); Eugene, OR
December 12, 2018*; 7:00 pm, P12N		San Diego	W 65–55	6–3	20 – Bol	9 – Bol	7 – Pritchard	Matthew Knight Arena (7,191); Eugene, OR
December 15, 2018*; 6:00 pm, P12N		Boise State	W 66–54	7–3	19 – Pritchard	5 – Tied	3 – Wooten	Matthew Knight Arena (8,506); Eugene, OR
December 18, 2018*; 3:00 pm, P12N		Florida A&M	W 71–64	8–3	16 – Bailey Jr.	7 – Wooten	4 – White	Matthew Knight Arena (6,909); Eugene, OR
December 21, 2018*; 4:00 pm, ESPN2		at Baylor	L 47–57	8–4	14 – Pritchard	4 – Wooten	4 – King	Ferrell Center (7,411); Waco, TX
December 29, 2018*; 4:30 pm, CBSSN		at Boise State	W 62–50	9–4	23 – Amin	6 – Tied	5 – Pritchard	Taco Bell Arena (7,563); Boise, ID
Pac-12 regular season
January 5, 2019; 5:00 pm, P12N		Oregon State; Civil War	L 72–77	9–5 (0–1)	17 – King	10 – King	6 – Pritchard	Matthew Knight Arena (11,204); Eugene, OR
January 10, 2019; 6:00 pm, ESPN		UCLA	L 84–87 ^{OT}	9–6 (0–2)	22 – King	10 – King	6 – Richardson	Matthew Knight Arena (10,105); Eugene, OR
January 13, 2019; 5:00 pm, ESPNU		USC	W 81–60	10–6 (1–2)	19 – Tied	8 – King	6 – King	Matthew Knight Arena (8,148); Eugene, OR
January 17, 2019; 6:00 pm, ESPN		at Arizona	W 59–54	11–6 (2–2)	16 – White	9 – King	4 – Pritchard	McKale Center (14,032); Tucson, AZ
January 19, 2019; 6:30 pm, P12N		at Arizona State	L 64–78	11–7 (2–3)	20 – Pritchard	6 – Pritchard	4 – Pritchard	Wells Fargo Arena (12,751); Tempe, AZ
January 24, 2019; 6:00 pm, ESPN2		Washington	L 56–61	11–8 (2–4)	19 – King	6 – Okoro	4 – Tied	Matthew Knight Arena (9,464); Eugene, OR
January 27, 2019; 5:00 pm, ESPNU		Washington State	W 78–58	12–8 (3–4)	22 – King	6 – White	8 – Pritchard	Matthew Knight Arena (8,929); Eugene, OR
January 31, 2019; 6:00 pm, FS1		at Utah	W 78–72	13–8 (4–4)	19 – Richardson	7 – Pritchard	3 – Tied	Jon M. Huntsman Center (11,301); Salt Lake City, UT
February 2, 2019; 6:30 pm, P12N		at Colorado	L 51–73	13–9 (4–5)	12 – King	8 – King	3 – Pritchard	CU Events Center (8,654); Boulder, CO
February 6, 2019; 6:30 pm, FS1		California	W 73–62	14–9 (5–5)	20 – Pritchard	10 – Pritchard	9 – Richardson	Matthew Knight Arena (8,768); Eugene, OR
February 10, 2019; 5:00 pm, ESPN2		Stanford	W 69–46	15–9 (6–5)	20 – Pritchard	7 – King	4 – Richardson	Matthew Knight Arena (9,014); Eugene, OR
February 16, 2019; 7:30 pm, P12N		at Oregon State; Civil War	L 57–72	15–10 (6–6)	12 – King	8 – King	7 – Pritchard	Gill Coliseum (9,301); Corvallis, OR
February 21, 2019; 6:00 pm, ESPN		at USC	L 49–66	15–11 (6–7)	16 – King	6 – King	3 – King	Galen Center (3,425); Los Angeles, CA
February 23, 2019; 7:00 pm, ESPN2		at UCLA	L 83–90	15–12 (6–8)	18 – Tied	9 – Wooten	8 – Pritchard	Pauley Pavilion (10,588); Los Angeles, CA
February 28, 2019; 8:00 pm, P12N		Arizona State	W 79–51	16–12 (7–8)	19 – King	10 – Okoro	4 – Pritchard	Matthew Knight Arena (7,682); Eugene, OR
March 2, 2019; 7:00 pm, ESPN2		Arizona	W 73–47	17–12 (8–8)	14 – King	7 – King	3 – Pritchard	Matthew Knight Arena (11,339); Eugene, OR
March 6, 2019; 8:00 pm, FS1		at Washington State	W 72–61	18–12 (9–8)	21 – White	6 – White	7 – Pritchard	Beasley Coliseum (2,065); Pullman, WA
March 9, 2019; 7:00 pm, ESPN		at Washington	W 55–47	19–12 (10–8)	16 – Pritchard	10 – Okoro	3 – Tied	Alaska Airlines Arena (10,000); Seattle, WA
Pac-12 Tournament
March 13, 2019; 8:30 pm, P12N	(6)	vs. (11) Washington State; First Round	W 84–51	20–12	17 – Amin	8 – Okoro	5 – Richardson	T-Mobile Arena (8,876); Paradise, NV
March 14, 2019; 8:30 pm, ESPN	(6)	vs. (3) Utah; Quarterfinals	W 66–54	21–12	20 – Tied	7 – King	5 – Pritchard	T-Mobile Arena (13,012); Paradise, NV
March 15, 2019; 8:30 pm, ESPN	(6)	vs. (2) Arizona State; Semifinals	W 79–75 ^{OT}	22–12	19 – King	7 – Tied	8 – Pritchard	T-Mobile Arena (13,955); Paradise, NV
March 16, 2019; 7:30 pm, ESPN	(6)	vs. (1) Washington; Championship	W 68–48	23–12	20 – Pritchard	7 – Wooten	7 – Pritchard	T-Mobile Arena (12,877); Paradise, NV
NCAA tournament
March 22, 2019*; 1:30 pm, TBS	(12 S)	vs. (5 S) No. 21 Wisconsin; First Round	W 72–54	24–12	19 – Pritchard	6 – Wooten	8 – Pritchard	SAP Center (14,331); San Jose, CA
March 24, 2019*; 6:40 pm, TBS	(12 S)	vs. (13 S) UC Irvine; Second Round	W 73–54	25–12	18 – Pritchard	8 – Wooten	7 – Pritchard	SAP Center (14,802); San Jose, CA
March 28, 2019*; 6:00 pm, TBS	(12 S)	vs. (1 S) No. 2 Virginia; Sweet Sixteen	L 49–53	25–13	16 – King	7 – Pritchard	4 – Pritchard	KFC Yum! Center (19,831); Louisville, KY
*Non-conference game. ^{#}Rankings from AP Poll. (#) Tournament seedings in parentheses. S=South Region. All times are in Pacific Time.

== Ranking movement ==
Ranking movements Legend: ██ Increase in ranking ██ Decrease in ranking — = Not ranked RV = Received votes
	Week																			
Poll	Pre	1	2	3	4	5	6	7	8	9	10	11	12	13	14	15	16	17	18	Final
AP	14	13	21	18	RV	—	—	—	—	—	—	—	—	—	—	—	—	—	—	Not released
Coaches	16	16^	20	21	RV	—	—	—	—	—	—	—	—	—	—	—	—	—	RV	21

*AP does not release post-NCAA tournament rankings.
^Coaches did not release a Week 1 poll.
