= 2018–19 Stanford Cardinal men's basketball team =

American college basketball season

2018–19 Stanford Cardinal men's basketball
- Conference: Pac-12 Conference
- Record: 15–16 (8–10 Pac-12)
- Head coach: Jerod Haase (3rd season)
- Assistant coaches: Jeff Wulbrun; Adam Cohen; Jesse Pruitt
- Home arena: Maples Pavilion

2018–19 Pac-12 Conference men's basketball standings
	Conf.				Overall
Team	W		L	PCT	W		L	PCT
Washington	15	–	3	.833	27	–	9	.750
Arizona State	12	–	6	.667	23	–	11	.676
Utah	11	–	7	.611	17	–	14	.548
Oregon State	10	–	8	.556	18	–	13	.581
Colorado	10	–	8	.556	23	–	13	.639
Oregon †	10	–	8	.556	25	–	13	.658
UCLA	9	–	9	.500	17	–	16	.515
USC	8	–	10	.444	16	–	17	.485
Arizona	8	–	10	.444	17	–	15	.531
Stanford	8	–	10	.444	15	–	16	.484
Washington State	4	–	14	.222	11	–	21	.344
California	3	–	15	.167	8	–	23	.258
† Pac-12 Conference tournament winner

The 2018–19 Stanford Cardinal men's basketball team represented Stanford University during the 2018–19 NCAA Division I men's basketball season. The Cardinal, led by third-year head coach Jerod Haase, played their home games at Maples Pavilion as a member of the Pac-12 Conference.

== Previous season ==
The Cardinal finished the 2017-18 season 19–16, 11–7 in Pac-12 play to finish in a three-way tie for third place; this was their most conference wins in a decade (since 2008). They lost in the quarterfinals of the Pac-12 tournament to UCLA. They qualified for the NIT, beating BYU in the first round, but lost to Oklahoma State in the second round.

== Offseason ==
=== Departures ===
Name	Pos.	Height	Weight	Year	Hometown	Reason for departure
Michael Humphrey	F	6'9"	245	Senior	Phoenix, AZ	Graduated
Dorian Pickens	G/F	6'5"	215	Senior	Phoenix, AZ	Graduated
Reid Travis	F	6'8"	245	RS junior	Minneapolis, MN	Graduate transfer to Kentucky
Robert Cartwright	G	6'2"	180	RS junior	Pasadena, CA	Graduate transfer to UC Irvine
Cameron Walker	F	6'7"	200	Junior	Santa Maria, CA	Unable to play due to NCAA medical disqualification

=== 2018 recruiting class ===
College recruiting
Name	Hometown	School	Height	Weight	Commit date
Cormac Ryan; SG	New York City, New York	Milton Academy	6 ft 5 in (1.96 m)	175 lb (79 kg)	Jun 4, 2017
Cormac Ryan; SG	Recruit ratings: Scout: Rivals: 247Sports: ESPN:				
Jaiden Delaire; SF	Granby, Connecticut	Loomis Chaffee School	6 ft 9 in (2.06 m)	200 lb (91 kg)	Aug 8, 2018
Jaiden Delaire; SF	Recruit ratings: Scout: Rivals: 247Sports: ESPN:				
Keenan Fitzmorris; C	Lenexa, Kansas	St. James Academy	6 ft 11 in (2.11 m)	190 lb (86 kg)	Jul 3, 2017
Keenan Fitzmorris; C	Recruit ratings: Scout: Rivals: 247Sports: ESPN:				
Bryce Wills; SG	White Plains, New York	Iona Preparatory School	6 ft 5 in (1.96 m)	170 lb (77 kg)	Dec 20, 2017
Bryce Wills; SG	Recruit ratings: Scout: Rivals: 247Sports: ESPN:				
Lukas Kišūnas; C	Vilnius, Lithuania	Brewster Academy	6 ft 10 in (2.08 m)	255 lb (116 kg)	May 1, 2018
Lukas Kišūnas; C	Recruit ratings: Scout: Rivals: 247Sports: ESPN:				
Overall recruit ranking:
Note: In many cases, Scout, Rivals, 247Sports, On3, and ESPN may conflict in their listings of height and weight.; In these cases, the average was taken. ESPN grades are on a 100-point scale.; Sources: "2018 Stanford Commits". Rivals.; "2018 Team Ranking". Rivals.

=== 2019 recruiting class ===
College recruiting
Name	Hometown	School	Height	Weight	Commit date
Tyrell Terry; PG	Minneapolis, MN	DeLaSalle (MN)	6 ft 1 in (1.85 m)	160 lb (73 kg)	Jun 10, 2018
Tyrell Terry; PG	Recruit ratings: Scout: Rivals: 247Sports: ESPN:				
Spencer Jones; SF	Roeland Park, KS	Bishop Miege	6 ft 7 in (2.01 m)	195 lb (88 kg)	May 16, 2019
Spencer Jones; SF	Recruit ratings: Scout: Rivals: 247Sports: ESPN:				
James Keefe; SF	Los Angeles, CA	Loyola (CA)	6 ft 7 in (2.01 m)	190 lb (86 kg)	Oct 17, 2018
James Keefe; SF	Recruit ratings: Scout: Rivals: 247Sports: ESPN:				
Overall recruit ranking:
Note: In many cases, Scout, Rivals, 247Sports, On3, and ESPN may conflict in their listings of height and weight.; In these cases, the average was taken. ESPN grades are on a 100-point scale.; Sources: "2019 Stanford Commits". Rivals.; "2019 Team Ranking". Rivals.

== Roster ==
2018–19 Stanford Cardinal men's basketball team
Players
Coaches

Pos.	#	Name	Height	Weight	Year	Previous school	Hometown
F	0	KZ Okpala	6 ft 9 in (2.06 m)	215 lb (98 kg)	So	Esperanza HS	Orange County, CA
G	1	Daejon Davis	6 ft 3 in (1.91 m)	185 lb (84 kg)	So	Garfield HS	Seattle, WA
G	2	Bryce Wills	6 ft 6 in (1.98 m)	195 lb (88 kg)	Fr	Iona Preparatory School	White Plains, NY
G	4	Isaac White	6 ft 2 in (1.88 m)	180 lb (82 kg)	So	Sacred Heart College	Adelaide, Australia
F	5	Kodye Pugh	6 ft 8 in (2.03 m)	205 lb (93 kg)	RS So	Blair Academy	Baltimore, MD
F	11	Jaiden Delaire	6 ft 9 in (2.06 m)	200 lb (91 kg)	Fr	Loomis Chaffee School	North Granby, CT
C	12	Keenan Fitzmorris	7 ft 0 in (2.13 m)	210 lb (95 kg)	Fr	New Hampton School	Overland Park, KS
F	13	Oscar da Silva	6 ft 9 in (2.06 m)	225 lb (102 kg)	So	Ludwig Gymnasium	Munich, Germany
G/F	14	Marcus Sheffield	6 ft 5 in (1.96 m)	180 lb (82 kg)	RS Jr	Chattahoochee HS	Alpharetta, GA
G	15	Rodney Herenton (W)	6 ft 1 in (1.85 m)	185 lb (84 kg)	Jr	Stevenson HS	Chicago, IL
C	20	Josh Sharma	7 ft 0 in (2.13 m)	230 lb (104 kg)	Sr	Northfield Mount Hermon	Lexington, MA
G	23	Cormac Ryan	6 ft 5 in (1.96 m)	190 lb (86 kg)	Fr	Milton Academy	New York City, NY
G	24	Sam Beskind (W)	6 ft 4 in (1.93 m)	193 lb (88 kg)	Fr	Catalina Foothills HS	Tucson, AZ
F	32	Lukas Kišūnas	6 ft 10 in (2.08 m)	245 lb (111 kg)	Fr	Brewster Academy	Vilnius, Lithuania
F	33	Trevor Stanback	6 ft 11 in (2.11 m)	225 lb (102 kg)	Jr	Maranatha HS	Pasadena, CA

Head coach

- Jerod Haase (Kansas)

Assistant coach(es)

- Jeff Wulbrun (Cal State Fullerton)
- Adam Cohen (Arizona)
- Jesse Pruitt (UC Davis)

Legend

- (C) Team captain
- (S) Suspended
- (I) Ineligible
- (W) Walk-on
- Injured
- Current redshirt

Roster

== Schedule and results ==
Date time, TV	Rank^{#}	Opponent^{#}	Result	Record	Site (attendance) city, state
Exhibition
October 30, 2018*; 7:00 pm		Sonoma State	W 75–59		Maples Pavilion (2,515); Stanford, CA
Non-conference regular season
November 6, 2018*; 7:00 pm, P12N		Seattle	W 96–74	1–0	Maples Pavilion (3,365); Stanford, CA
November 9, 2018*; 4:00 pm		at UNC Wilmington	W 72–59	2–0	Trask Coliseum (4,356); Wilmington, NC
November 12, 2018*; 4:00 pm, ESPN2		at No. 7 North Carolina	L 72–90	2–1	Dean Smith Center (19,647); Chapel Hill, NC
November 16, 2018*; 7:00 pm, P12N		Wofford; Battle 4 Atlantis campus-site game	Cancelled ^{[a]}		Maples Pavilion; Stanford, CA
November 21, 2018*; 11:30 am, ESPN		vs. No. 25 Wisconsin; Battle 4 Atlantis Quarterfinals	L 46–62	2–2	Imperial Arena (1,573); Nassau, Bahamas
November 22, 2018*; 4:00 pm, ESPN2		vs. Florida; Battle 4 Atlantis Consolation 2nd round	L 49–72	2–3	Imperial Arena (1,109); Nassau, Bahamas
November 23, 2018*; 4:00 pm, ESPNU		vs. Middle Tennessee State; Battle 4 Atlantis 7th place game	W 67–54	3–3	Imperial Arena; Nassau, Bahamas
November 28, 2018*; 7:00 pm, P12N		Portland State	W 79–67	4–3	Maples Pavilion (3,240); Stanford, CA
December 1, 2018*; 2:30 pm, ESPN		at No. 2 Kansas	L 84–90 ^{OT}	4–4	Allen Fieldhouse (16,300); Lawrence, KS
December 15, 2018*; 4:00 pm, P12N		Eastern Washington	W 78–62	5–4	Maples Pavilion (3,663); Stanford, CA
December 18, 2018*; 7:00 pm, P12N		San Jose State; Rivalry	W 78–73	6–4	Maples Pavilion (2,821); Stanford, CA
December 22, 2018*; 7:00 pm, P12N		at San Francisco	L 65–74	6–5	War Memorial Gymnasium (3,005); San Francisco, CA
December 29, 2018*; 7:30 pm, P12N		Long Beach State	W 93–86	7–5	Maples Pavilion (3,452); Stanford, CA
Pac-12 regular season
January 3, 2019; 8:00 pm, ESPN		at UCLA	L 70–92	7–6 (0–1)	Pauley Pavilion (8,026); Los Angeles, CA
January 6, 2019; 5:00 pm, ESPNU		at USC	L 66–77	7–7 (0–2)	Galen Center (3,768); Los Angeles, CA
January 9, 2019; 8:00 pm, P12N		Arizona	L 70–75	7–8 (0–3)	Maples Pavilion (3,909); Stanford, CA
January 12, 2019; 3:00 pm, P12N		Arizona State	W 85–71	8–8 (1–3)	Maples Pavilion (3,969); Stanford, CA
January 17, 2019; 6:00 pm, ESPN2		at Washington	L 64–80	8–9 (1–4)	Alaska Airlines Arena (7,852); Seattle, WA
January 19, 2019; 12:00 pm, P12N		at Washington State	W 78–66	9–9 (2–4)	Beasley Coliseum (2,364); Pullman, WA
January 24, 2019; 6:00 pm, P12N		Utah	L 66–70	9–10 (2–5)	Maples Pavilion (3,279); Stanford, CA
January 26, 2019; 5:00 pm, FS1		Colorado	W 75–62	10–10 (3–5)	Maples Pavilion (3,648); Stanford, CA
February 3, 2019; 1:00 pm, ESPNU		at California	W 84–81	11–10 (4–5)	Haas Pavilion (7,840); Berkeley, CA
February 7, 2019; 7:00 pm, P12N		at Oregon State	W 83–60	12–10 (5–5)	Gill Coliseum (4,293); Corvallis, OR
February 10, 2019; 5:00 pm, ESPN2		at Oregon	L 46–69	12–11 (5–6)	Matthew Knight Arena (9,014); Eugene, OR
February 13, 2019; 8:00 pm, ESPNU		USC	W 79–76	13–11 (6–6)	Maples Pavilion (5,052); Stanford, CA
February 16, 2019; 7:00 pm, ESPN2		UCLA	W 104–80	14–11 (7–6)	Maples Pavilion (5,418); Stanford, CA
February 20, 2019; 6:00 pm, ESPN2		at Arizona State	L 62–80	14–12 (7–7)	Wells Fargo Arena (10,327); Tempe, AZ
February 24, 2019; 5:00 pm, ESPN2		at Arizona	L 54–70	14–13 (7–8)	McKale Center (13,859); Tucson, AZ
February 28, 2019; 6:00 pm, P12N		Washington State	W 98–50	15–13 (8–8)	Maples Pavilion (3,139); Stanford, CA
March 3, 2019; 1:00 pm, ESPN2		No. 25 Washington	L 61–62	15–14 (8–9)	Maples Pavilion (5,741); Stanford, CA
March 7, 2019; 8:00 pm, ESPNU		California	L 59–64	15–15 (8–10)	Maples Pavilion (3,822); Stanford, CA
Pac-12 tournament
March 13, 2018; 6:00 pm, P12N	(10)	vs. (7) UCLA; First round	L 72–79	15–16	T-Mobile Arena (8,876); Paradise, NV
*Non-conference game. ^{#}Rankings from AP Poll. (#) Tournament seedings in parentheses. All times are in Pacific Time.

^{^[a]} The game between Stanford and Wofford had been originally scheduled for November 16, 2018, but was cancelled due to wildfires and was not rescheduled.
