= 2018–19 Utah Utes men's basketball team =

American college basketball season

2018–19 Utah Utes men's basketball
- Conference: Pac-12 Conference
- Record: 17–14 (11–7 Pac–12)
- Head coach: Larry Krystkowiak (8th season)
- Assistant coaches: Tommy Connor; DeMarlo Slocum; Andy Hill
- Home arena: Jon M. Huntsman Center

2018–19 Pac-12 Conference men's basketball standings
	Conf.				Overall
Team	W		L	PCT	W		L	PCT
Washington	15	–	3	.833	27	–	9	.750
Arizona State	12	–	6	.667	23	–	11	.676
Utah	11	–	7	.611	17	–	14	.548
Oregon State	10	–	8	.556	18	–	13	.581
Colorado	10	–	8	.556	23	–	13	.639
Oregon †	10	–	8	.556	25	–	13	.658
UCLA	9	–	9	.500	17	–	16	.515
USC	8	–	10	.444	16	–	17	.485
Arizona	8	–	10	.444	17	–	15	.531
Stanford	8	–	10	.444	15	–	16	.484
Washington State	4	–	14	.222	11	–	21	.344
California	3	–	15	.167	8	–	23	.258
† Pac-12 Conference tournament winner

The 2018–19 Utah Runnin' Utes men's basketball team represented the University of Utah during the 2018–19 NCAA Division I men's basketball season. The team, led by eighth-year head coach Larry Krystkowiak, played their home games at the Jon M. Huntsman Center in Salt Lake City, Utah as members of the Pac-12 Conference. They finished the season 17–14, 11–7 in Pac-12 play to finish in third place. They lost in the quarterfinals of the Pac-12 tournament to Oregon.

== Previous season ==
The Utes finished the 2017–18 season 23–12, 11–7 in Pac-12 play to finish in a three-way tie for third place. They lost in the quarterfinals of the Pac-12 tournament to Oregon. They were invited to the National Invitation Tournament, where they defeated UC Davis, LSU, Saint Mary's, and Western Kentucky to advance to the championship game. In the NIT championship, they were routed by Penn State, losing 82–66.

== Off-season ==
=== Departures ===
Name	Num	Pos.	Height	Weight	Year	Hometown	Reason for departure
Justin Bibbins	1	G	5'8"	150	Senior	Carson, CA	Graduated
Kolbe Caldwell	2	G	6'5"	205	Sophomore	Bowling Green, KY	Transferred
Jake Connor	10	G	6'3"	181	RS junior	Salt Lake City, UT	Transferred to Westminster
Chris Seeley	11	F	6'8"	215	Sophomore	Fresno, CA	Transferred to Fresno State
David Collette	13	F	6'10"	220	Senior	Murray, UT	Graduated
Nate Duda	15	G	6'5"	190	Sophomore	Framingham, MA	Left team
Tyler Rawson	21	F	6'10"	225	Senior	American Fork, UT	Graduated
Gabe Bealer	30	G/F	6'6"	183	Senior	San Francisco, CA	Graduated
Jakub Jokl	43	F	6'11'	230	Sophomore	Havlíčkův Brod, Czech Republic	Left team

=== Incoming transfers ===
Name	Num	Pos.	Height	Weight	Year	Hometown	Previous school
Charles Jones Jr.	1	G	6'2"	200	Junior	Portland, OR	College of Southern Idaho.
Novak Topalovic	13	C	7'0"	230	RS senior	Niš, Serbia	Idaho State

=== 2018 recruiting class ===
College recruiting
Name	Hometown	School	Height	Weight	Commit date
Riley Battin #26 C	Oak Park, CA	Oak Park High School	6 ft 9 in (2.06 m)	235 lb (107 kg)	Sep 21, 2017
Riley Battin #26 C	Recruit ratings: Scout: Rivals: 247Sports: ESPN: (80)				
Timmy Allen #22 PF	Mesa, AZ	Desert Ridge High School	6 ft 5 in (1.96 m)	200 lb (91 kg)	Sep 18, 2017
Timmy Allen #22 PF	Recruit ratings: Scout: Rivals: 247Sports: ESPN: (80)				
Naseem Gaskin #55 SG	Oakland, CA	Bishop O'Dowd High School	6 ft 3 in (1.91 m)	235 lb (107 kg)	Sep 13, 2017
Naseem Gaskin #55 SG	Recruit ratings: Scout: Rivals: 247Sports: ESPN: (70)				
Lahat Thioune; PF	Melbourne, FL	Florida Air Academy	6 ft 11 in (2.11 m)	205 lb (93 kg)	Apr 11, 2018
Lahat Thioune; PF	Recruit ratings: Scout: Rivals: 247Sports:				
Both Gach; SF	Austin, MN	AZ Compass Prep School	6 ft 7 in (2.01 m)	190 lb (86 kg)	Jun 1, 2018
Both Gach; SF	Recruit ratings: Scout: Rivals: 247Sports:				
Overall recruit ranking:
Note: In many cases, Scout, Rivals, 247Sports, On3, and ESPN may conflict in their listings of height and weight.; In these cases, the average was taken. ESPN grades are on a 100-point scale.; Sources: "2018 Utah Basketball Commitment List". Rivals.; "Utah Utes 2018 Player Commits". ESPN.; "2018 Team Ranking". Rivals.

=== 2019 recruiting class ===
College recruiting (2019)
Name	Hometown	School	Height	Weight	Commit date
Rylan Jones; PG	Logan, UT	Logan High School	5 ft 11 in (1.80 m)	150 lb (68 kg)	Aug 8, 2017
Rylan Jones; PG	Recruit ratings: Scout: Rivals: 247Sports: ESPN: (83)				
Matt Van Komen; C	Lehi, UT	Pleasant Grove High School	7 ft 4 in (2.24 m)	150 lb (68 kg)	Jul 30, 2018
Matt Van Komen; C	Recruit ratings: Scout: Rivals: 247Sports: ESPN: (82)				
Mikael Jantunen; PF	Helsinki, Finland	Helsinki Basketball Academy	6 ft 9 in (2.06 m)	215 lb (98 kg)	Oct 8, 2018
Mikael Jantunen; PF	Recruit ratings: Scout: Rivals: 247Sports: ESPN: (NR)				
Brendan Wenzel; SG	Helotes, TX	O'Connor High School	6 ft 5 in (1.96 m)	170 lb (77 kg)	Apr 18, 2019
Brendan Wenzel; SG	Recruit ratings: Scout: Rivals: 247Sports: ESPN: (NR)				
Overall recruit ranking:
Note: In many cases, Scout, Rivals, 247Sports, On3, and ESPN may conflict in their listings of height and weight.; In these cases, the average was taken. ESPN grades are on a 100-point scale.; Sources: "2019 Utah Basketball Commitment List". Rivals.; "Utah Utes 2019 Player Commits". ESPN.; "2019 Team Ranking". Rivals.

== Roster ==
2018–19 Utah Utes men's basketball team
Players
Coaches

Pos.	#	Name	Height	Weight	Year	Previous school	Hometown
G	0	Naseem Gaskin	6 ft 3 in (1.91 m)	175 lb (79 kg)	Fr	Bishop O'Dowd HS	Oakland, California
F	1	Charles Jones Jr.	6 ft 2 in (1.88 m)	200 lb (91 kg)	Jr	College of Southern Idaho	Portland, Oregon
G	2	Sedrick Barefield	6 ft 2 in (1.88 m)	190 lb (86 kg)	Sr	Southern Methodist	Corona, California
F	3	Donnie Tillman	6 ft 7 in (2.01 m)	225 lb (102 kg)	So	Findlay Prep	Detroit, Michigan
G	5	Parker Van Dyke	6 ft 3 in (1.91 m)	185 lb (84 kg)	RS Sr	East HS	Salt Lake City, Utah
G	10	Christian Popoola	6 ft 4 in (1.93 m)	190 lb (86 kg)	So	Bishop Gorman HS	Las Vegas, Nevada
G	11	Both Gach	6 ft 7 in (2.01 m)	195 lb (88 kg)	Fr	AZ Compass Prep School	Austin, Minnesota
F	13	Novak Topalovic	7 ft 0 in (2.13 m)	230 lb (104 kg)	RS Sr	Idaho State	Niš, Serbia
G	14	Vante Hendrix	6 ft 5 in (1.96 m)	190 lb (86 kg)	RS Fr	Birmingham HS	Woodland Hills, California
G	15	Kevin Kremer (W)	6 ft 4 in (1.93 m)	190 lb (86 kg)	Fr	Pleasant Valley HS	Chico, California
F	20	Timmy Allen	6 ft 6 in (1.98 m)	210 lb (95 kg)	Fr	Red Mountain HS	Mesa, Arizona
F	21	Riley Battin	6 ft 9 in (2.06 m)	220 lb (100 kg)	Fr	Oak Park HS	Oak Park, California
G	25	Beau Rydalch (W)	6 ft 6 in (1.98 m)	205 lb (93 kg)	Jr	South Summit HS	Oakley, Utah
G	30	Brooks King (W)	6 ft 3 in (1.91 m)	200 lb (91 kg)	So	Centennial HS	Boise, Idaho
F/C	31	Brandon Morley (W)	7 ft 0 in (2.13 m)	235 lb (107 kg)	Jr	Salt Lake CC	South Jordan, Utah
F	32	Lahat Thioune	6 ft 10 in (2.08 m)	210 lb (95 kg)	Fr	Florida Prep	Dakar, Senegal
F/C	34	Jayce Johnson	7 ft 0 in (2.13 m)	235 lb (107 kg)	RS Jr	Santa Monica HS	Mission Viejo, California
F	40	Marc Reininger (W)	6 ft 9 in (2.06 m)	220 lb (100 kg)	Jr	Regis Jesuit HS	Monument, Colorado

Head coach

- Larry Krystkowiak (Montana)

Assistant coach(es)

- Tommy Connor (Utah)
- Andy Hill (Eastern Washington)
- DeMarlo Slocum (Georgia Southern)

Legend

- (C) Team captain
- (S) Suspended
- (I) Ineligible
- (W) Walk-on
- Injured
- Current redshirt

Roster

== Schedule and results ==
Date time, TV	Rank^{#}	Opponent^{#}	Result	Record	Site (attendance) city, state
Exhibition
November 1, 2018*; 7:00 pm, P12N		College of Idaho	W 96–76	–	Jon M. Huntsman Center (10,244); Salt Lake City, UT
Non-conference regular season
November 8, 2018*; 7:00 pm, P12N		Maine	W 75–61	1–0	Jon M. Huntsman Center (10,971); Salt Lake City, UT
November 12, 2018*; 7:00 pm, BTN		at Minnesota	L 69–78	1–1	Williams Arena (11,554); Minneapolis, MN
November 15, 2018*; 6:00 pm, P12N		Mississippi Valley State	W 98–63	2–1	Jon M. Huntsman Center (10,804); Salt Lake City, UT
November 22, 2018*; 9:30 pm, ESPN2		vs. Hawaii; Wooden Legacy quarterfinals	L 79–90	2–2	Titan Gym (2,132); Fullerton, CA
November 23, 2018*; 7:00 pm, ESPN3		vs. Grand Canyon; Wooden Legacy Consolation 2nd round	W 75–66	3–2	Titan Gym; Fullerton, CA
November 25, 2018*; 12:00 pm, ESPNU		vs. Northwestern; Wooden Legacy 5th place game	L 57–79	3–3	Titan Gym; Fullerton, CA
December 1, 2018*; 3:00 pm, P12N		Tulsa	W 69–64	4–3	Jon M. Huntsman Center (10,775); Salt Lake City, UT
December 8, 2018*; 12:00 pm, ESPNU		vs. BYU; Rivalry/Beehive Classic	L 59–74	4–4	Vivint Smart Home Arena; Salt Lake City, UT
December 15, 2018*; 3:00 pm, ESPN2		at No. 19 Kentucky	L 61–88	4–5	Rupp Arena (21,922); Lexington, KY
December 17, 2018*; 6:00 pm, P12N		Florida A&M	W 93–64	5–5	Jon M. Huntsman Center (10,887); Salt Lake City, UT
December 21, 2018*; 7:00 pm, P12N		Northern Arizona	W 76–62	6–5	Jon M. Huntsman Center (11,239); Salt Lake City, UT
December 29, 2018*; 12:00 pm, P12N		No. 6 Nevada	L 71–86	6–6	Jon M. Huntsman Center (12,835); Salt Lake City, UT
Pac-12 regular season
January 3, 2019; 6:00 pm, P12N		at Arizona State	W 96–86	7–6 (1–0)	Wells Fargo Arena (9,128); Temple, AZ
January 5, 2019; 12:00 pm, P12N		at Arizona	L 81–84 ^{OT}	7–7 (1–1)	McKale Center (13,764); Tucson, AZ
January 10, 2019; 8:00 pm, FS1		Washington	L 53–69	7–8 (1–2)	Jon M. Huntsman Center (10,481); Salt Lake City, UT
January 12, 2019; 6:30 pm, P12N		Washington State	W 88–70	8–8 (2–2)	Jon M. Huntsman Center (11,358); Salt Lake City, UT
January 20, 2019; 4:00 pm, ESPNU		at Colorado	W 78–69	9–8 (3–2)	CU Events Center (10,372); Boulder, CO
January 24, 2019; 7:00 pm, P12N		at Stanford	W 70–66	10–8 (4–2)	Maples Pavilion (3,279); Stanford, CA
January 26, 2019; 6:00 pm, ESPNU		at California	W 82–64	11–8 (5–2)	Haas Pavilion (6,218); Berkeley, CA
January 31, 2019; 7:00 pm, FS1		Oregon	L 72–78	11–9 (5–3)	Jon M. Huntsman Center (11,301); Salt Lake City, UT
February 2, 2019; 3:00 pm, P12N		Oregon State	L 72–81	11–10 (5–4)	Jon M. Huntsman Center (11,884); Salt Lake City, UT
February 6, 2019; 9:00 pm, P12N		at USC	W 77–70	12–10 (6–4)	Galen Center (2,952); Los Angeles, CA
February 9, 2019; 3:00 pm, FOX		at UCLA	W 93–92	13–10 (7–4)	Pauley Pavilion (7,268); Los Angeles, CA
February 14, 2019; 7:00 pm, ESPNU		Arizona	W 83–76	14–10 (8–4)	Jon M. Huntsman Center (11,478); Salt Lake City, UT
February 16, 2019; 8:30 pm, FS1		Arizona State	L 87–98	14–11 (8–5)	Jon M. Huntsman Center (12,585); Salt Lake City, UT
February 20, 2019; 9:00 pm, FS1		at Washington	L 45–62	14–12 (8–6)	Alaska Airlines Arena (8,268); Seattle, WA
February 23, 2019; 6:00 pm, P12N		at Washington State	W 92–79	15–12 (9–6)	Beasley Coliseum (3,199); Pullman, WA
March 2, 2019; 4:00 pm, ESPNU		Colorado	L 63–71	15–13 (9–7)	Jon M. Huntsman Center (8,405); Salt Lake City, UT
March 7, 2019; 8:00 pm, FS1		USC	W 83–74	16–13 (10–7)	Jon M. Huntsman Center (11,007); Salt Lake City, UT
March 8, 2019; 4:00 pm, P12N		UCLA	W 92–81	17–13 (11–7)	Jon M. Huntsman Center (12,914); Salt Lake City, UT
Pac-12 tournament
March 14, 2019; 9:30 pm, ESPN	(3)	vs. (6) Oregon; Quarterfinals	L 54–66	17–14	T-Mobile Arena (13,012); Paradise, NV
*Non-conference game. ^{#}Rankings from AP Poll. (#) Tournament seedings in parentheses. All times are in Mountain Time.
