= 2018–19 Colorado Buffaloes men's basketball team =

American college basketball season

2018–19 Colorado Buffaloes men's basketball

NIT, Quarterfinals
- Conference: Pac-12 Conference
- Record: 23–13 (10–8 Pac-12)
- Head coach: Tad Boyle (9th season)
- Assistant coaches: Mike Rhon; Bill Grier; Kim English
- Home arena: CU Events Center

2018–19 Pac-12 Conference men's basketball standings
	Conf.				Overall
Team	W		L	PCT	W		L	PCT
Washington	15	–	3	.833	27	–	9	.750
Arizona State	12	–	6	.667	23	–	11	.676
Utah	11	–	7	.611	17	–	14	.548
Oregon State	10	–	8	.556	18	–	13	.581
Colorado	10	–	8	.556	23	–	13	.639
Oregon †	10	–	8	.556	25	–	13	.658
UCLA	9	–	9	.500	17	–	16	.515
USC	8	–	10	.444	16	–	17	.485
Arizona	8	–	10	.444	17	–	15	.531
Stanford	8	–	10	.444	15	–	16	.484
Washington State	4	–	14	.222	11	–	21	.344
California	3	–	15	.167	8	–	23	.258
† Pac-12 Conference tournament winner

The 2018–19 Colorado Buffaloes men's basketball team represented the University of Colorado in the 2018–19 NCAA Division I men's basketball season. They were led by head coach Tad Boyle in his ninth season at Colorado. The Buffaloes played their home games at CU Events Center in Boulder, Colorado as members of the Pac-12 Conference. They finished the season 23–13, 10–8 in Pac-12 play to finish in a 3-way tie for fourth place. They defeated California and Oregon State in the first round and quarterfinals of the Pac-12 tournament before losing in the semifinals to Washington. They received an invitation to the National Invitation Tournament where they defeated Dayton in the first round, Norfolk State in the second round before losing to Texas in the quarterfinals.

== Previous season ==
The Buffaloes finished the 2017–18 season 17–15, 8–10 in Pac-12 play to finish in a tie for eighth place. They defeated Arizona State in the first round of the Pac-12 tournament before losing in the quarterfinals to Arizona.

== Off-season ==
=== Departures ===
Name	Num	Pos.	Height	Weight	Year	Hometown	Reason for departure
Lazar Nikolic	11	G	6'7"	205	Freshman	Belgrade, Serbia	Playing professional overseas
Tony Miller-Stewart	14	F	6'9"	246	Senior	Lee's Summit, MO	Graduated
Dominique Collier	15	G	6'2"	176	Senior	Denver, CO	Graduated
George King	24	G	6'6"	225	RS Senior	Fayetteville, NC	Graduated/2018 NBA draft
Josh Repine	33	G	6'3"	195	Senior	Englewood, CO	Walk-on; graduated

=== Incoming transfers ===
Name	Num	Pos.	Height	Weight	Year	Hometown	Previous school
Shane Gatling	0	G	6'2"	170	Junior	Baldwin, NY	Indian Hills CC
Frank Ryder	30	F	6'10"	230	Sophomore	Boulder, CO	San Diego

=== 2018 recruiting class ===
College recruiting
Name	Hometown	School	Height	Weight	Commit date
Daylen Kountz; SG	Denver, CO	East High School	6 ft 4 in (1.93 m)	170 lb (77 kg)	Sep 8, 2017
Daylen Kountz; SG	Recruit ratings: Scout: Rivals: 247Sports: ESPN:				
Elijah Parquet; SG	Beaumont, TX	West Brook High School	6 ft 4 in (1.93 m)	185 lb (84 kg)	Sep 9, 2017
Elijah Parquet; SG	Recruit ratings: Scout: Rivals: 247Sports: ESPN:				
Jakub Dombek; PF	Ostrava, Czech Republic	Get Better Academy	6 ft 11 in (2.11 m)	200 lb (91 kg)	Apr 3, 2018
Jakub Dombek; PF	Recruit ratings: Scout: Rivals: 247Sports: ESPN:				
Overall recruit ranking:
Note: In many cases, Scout, Rivals, 247Sports, On3, and ESPN may conflict in their listings of height and weight.; In these cases, the average was taken. ESPN grades are on a 100-point scale.; Sources: "2018 Colorado Commits". Rivals.; "2018 Team Ranking". Rivals.

== Roster ==
2018–19 Colorado Buffaloes men's basketball team
Players
Coaches

Pos.	#	Name	Height	Weight	Year	Previous school	Hometown
G	0	Shane Gatling	6 ft 2 in (1.88 m)	181 lb (82 kg)	Jr	Indian Hills CC	Baldwin, NY
G/F	1	Tyler Bey (C)	6 ft 7 in (2.01 m)	218 lb (99 kg)	So	Middlebrooks Academy	Las Vegas, NV
G	2	Daylen Kountz	6 ft 4 in (1.93 m)	185 lb (84 kg)	Fr	East HS	Denver, CO
G/F	5	D'Shawn Schwartz	6 ft 7 in (2.01 m)	226 lb (103 kg)	So	Sand Creek HS	Colorado Springs, CO
F	10	Alexander Strating	6 ft 7 in (2.01 m)	227 lb (103 kg)	RS So	American School of The Hague	Wassenaars, Netherlands
G	12	AJ Martinka (W)	6 ft 5 in (1.96 m)	195 lb (88 kg)	So	Stanwood HS	Stanwood, WA
G	13	Namon Wright (C)	6 ft 5 in (1.96 m)	197 lb (89 kg)	RS Sr	Missouri	Los Angeles, CA
G	14	Deleon Brown	6 ft 4 in (1.93 m)	165 lb (75 kg)	Jr	Brewster Academy	Grand Rapids, MI
F	15	Jakub Dombek (redshirt)	6 ft 11 in (2.11 m)	190 lb (86 kg)	Fr	Get Better Academy	Ostrava, Czech Republic
F	21	Evan Battey	6 ft 8 in (2.03 m)	264 lb (120 kg)	RS Fr	Villa Park HS	Los Angeles, CA
F	23	Lucas Siewert	6 ft 10 in (2.08 m)	230 lb (104 kg)	RS Jr	Brennan HS	Joinville, Brazil
G	24	Elijah Parquet	6 ft 3 in (1.91 m)	192 lb (87 kg)	Fr	West Brook HS	Beaumont, TX
G	25	McKinley Wright IV (C)	6 ft 0 in (1.83 m)	195 lb (88 kg)	So	Champlin Park HS	North Robbinsdale, MN
F	30	Frank Ryder (W) (redshirt)	6 ft 10 in (2.08 m)	240 lb (109 kg)	So	Fairview; San Diego	Boulder, CO
G	33	Aidan McQuade (W)	6 ft 2 in (1.88 m)	185 lb (84 kg)	So	Loveland HS	Loveland, CO
G	34	Benan Ersek (W)	6 ft 2 in (1.88 m)	170 lb (77 kg)	Fr	Kent Denver School	Vienna, Austria
F/C	35	Dallas Walton (injured)	7 ft 0 in (2.13 m)	235 lb (107 kg)	RS So	Arvada West HS	Arvada, CO

Head coach

- Tad Boyle (Kansas)

Assistant coach(es)

- Mike Rohn (McPherson)
- Bill Grier (Oregon)
- Kim English (Missouri)

Legend

- (C) Team captain
- (S) Suspended
- (I) Ineligible
- (W) Walk-on
- Injured
- Current redshirt

Roster

== Schedule and results ==
Date time, TV	Rank^{#}	Opponent^{#}	Result	Record	Site (attendance) city, state
Exhibition
November 3, 2018*; 4:00 pm		Colorado Mines	W 66–57	–	CU Events Center (2,046); Boulder, CO
Non-conference regular season
November 13, 2018*; 6:00 pm, P12N		Drake	W 100–71	1–0	CU Events Center (5,695); Boulder, CO
November 16, 2018*; 7:00 pm, P12N		Omaha	W 79–75	2–0	CU Events Center (5,720); Boulder, CO
November 20, 2018*; 8:00 pm, ESPNU		at San Diego	L 64–70	2–1	Jenny Craig Pavilion (1,808); San Diego, CA
November 24, 2018*; 4:00 pm, ATTSNRM		at Air Force	W 93–56	3–1	Clune Arena (2,704); Colorado Springs, CO
November 28, 2018*; 7:00 pm, P12N		Portland	W 93–69	4–1	CU Events Center (5,550); Boulder, CO
December 1, 2018*; 1:00 pm, P12N		Colorado State	W 86–80	5–1	CU Events Center (7,887); Boulder, CO
December 4, 2018*; 7:00 pm, P12N		South Dakota	W 82–58	6–1	CU Events Center (6,462); Boulder, CO
December 8, 2018*; 4:00 pm, P12N		UIC	W 84–72	7–1	CU Events Center (7,277); Boulder, CO
December 11, 2018*; 7:00 pm, ESPN2		at New Mexico	W 78–75	8–1	Dreamstyle Arena (10,800); Albuquerque, NM
December 22, 2018*; 2:00 pm, ESPNU		vs. Indiana State; Diamond Head Classic Quarterfinals	L 67–72	8–2	Stan Sheriff Center (6,049); Honolulu, HI
December 23, 2018*; 5:00 pm, ESPNU		at Hawaii; Diamond Head Classic consolation 2nd round	L 72–80 ^{OT}	8–3	Stan Sheriff Center (5,470); Honolulu, HI
December 25, 2018*; 11:00 am, ESPNU		vs. Charlotte; Diamond Head Classic 7th place game	W 68–53	9–3	Stan Sheriff Center (5,696); Honolulu, HI
Pac-12 regular season
January 3, 2019; 7:00 pm, FS1		at Arizona	L 56–64	9–4 (0–1)	McKale Center (13,511); Tucson, AZ
January 5, 2019; 4:00 pm, P12N		at Arizona State	L 61–83	9–5 (0–2)	Wells Fargo Arena (10,003); Temple, AZ
January 10, 2019; 7:00 pm, P12N		Washington State	W 92–60	10–5 (1–2)	CU Events Center (6,184); Boulder, CO
January 12, 2019; 8:00 pm, ESPNU		Washington	L 70–77	10–6 (1–3)	CU Events Center (7,758); Boulder, CO
January 20, 2019; 4:00 pm, ESPNU		at Utah	L 69–78	10–7 (1–4)	Jon M. Huntsman Center (10,372); Salt Lake City, UT
January 24, 2019; 9:00 pm, P12N		at California	W 68–59	11–7 (2–4)	Haas Pavilion (5,720); Berkeley, CA
January 26, 2019; 6:00 pm, FS1		at Stanford	L 62–75	11–8 (2–5)	Maples Pavilion (3,648); Stanford, CA
January 31, 2019; 7:00 pm, P12N		Oregon State	L 74–76	11–9 (2–6)	CU Events Center (6,839); Boulder, CO
February 2, 2019; 7:30 pm, P12N		Oregon	W 73–51	12–9 (3–6)	CU Events Center (8,654); Boulder, CO
February 6, 2019; 7:00 pm, P12N		at UCLA	W 84–73	13–9 (4–6)	Pauley Pavilion (6,983); Los Angeles, CA
February 8, 2019; 8:00 pm, ESPNU		at USC	W 69–65	14–9 (5–6)	Galen Center (3,974); Los Angeles, CA
February 13, 2019; 8:30 pm, FS1		Arizona State	W 77–73	15–9 (6–6)	CU Events Center (6,273); Boulder, CO
February 17, 2019; 6:00 pm, ESPNU		Arizona	W 67–60	16–9 (7–6)	CU Events Center (7,899); Boulder, CO
February 20, 2019; 8:00 pm, P12N		at Washington State	L 74–76	16–10 (7–7)	Beasley Coliseum (1,911); Pullman, WA
February 23, 2019; 8:30 pm, P12N		at Washington	L 55–64	16–11 (7–8)	Alaska Airlines Arena (10,000); Seattle, WA
March 2, 2019; 4:00 pm, ESPNU		Utah	W 71–63	17–11 (8–8)	CU Events Center (8,405); Boulder, CO
March 7, 2019; 7:00 pm, ESPN2		UCLA	W 93–68	18–11 (9–8)	CU Events Center (7,797); Boulder, CO
March 9, 2019; 3:00 pm, P12N		USC	W 78–67	19–11 (10–8)	CU Events Center (9,379); Boulder, CO
Pac-12 tournament
March 13, 2019; 3:30 pm, P12N	(5)	vs. (12) California; First Round	W 56–51	20–11	T-Mobile Arena (9,748); Paradise, NV
March 14, 2019; 3:30 pm, P12N	(5)	vs. (4) Oregon State; Quarterfinals	W 73–58	21–11	T-Mobile Arena (10,556); Paradise, NV
March 15, 2019; 7:00 pm, P12N	(5)	vs. (1) Washington; Semifinals	L 61–66	21–12	T-Mobile Arena (13,955); Paradise, NV
NIT
March 19, 2019*; 9:00 pm, ESPN2	(4)	(5) Dayton; First Round – Alabama Bracket	W 78–73	22–12	CU Events Center (3,091); Boulder, CO
March 25, 2019*; 7:00 pm, ESPN2	(4)	(8) Norfolk State; Second Round – Alabama Bracket	W 76–60	23–12	CU Events Center (5,891); Boulder, CO
March 27, 2019*; 7:00 pm, ESPN2	(4)	at (2) Texas; Quarterfinals – Alabama Bracket	L 55–68	23–13	Frank Erwin Center (3,982); Austin, TX
*Non-conference game. ^{#}Rankings from AP Poll. (#) Tournament seedings in parentheses. All times are in Mountain Time.
