= 2018–19 Arizona State Sun Devils men's basketball team =

American college basketball season

2018–19 Arizona State Sun Devils men's basketball

MGM Resorts Main Event Heavyweight champions

NCAA tournament, First Round
- Conference: Pac-12 Conference
- Record: 23–11 (12–6 Pac–12)
- Head coach: Bobby Hurley (4th season)
- Assistant coaches: Rashon Burno; Anthony Coleman; Dražen Zlovarić
- Home arena: Wells Fargo Arena

2018–19 Pac-12 Conference men's basketball standings
	Conf.				Overall
Team	W		L	PCT	W		L	PCT
Washington	15	–	3	.833	27	–	9	.750
Arizona State	12	–	6	.667	23	–	11	.676
Utah	11	–	7	.611	17	–	14	.548
Oregon State	10	–	8	.556	18	–	13	.581
Colorado	10	–	8	.556	23	–	13	.639
Oregon †	10	–	8	.556	25	–	13	.658
UCLA	9	–	9	.500	17	–	16	.515
USC	8	–	10	.444	16	–	17	.485
Arizona	8	–	10	.444	17	–	15	.531
Stanford	8	–	10	.444	15	–	16	.484
Washington State	4	–	14	.222	11	–	21	.344
California	3	–	15	.167	8	–	23	.258
† Pac-12 Conference tournament winner

The 2018–19 Arizona State Sun Devils men's basketball team represented Arizona State University during the 2018–19 NCAA Division I men's basketball season. The Sun Devils, led by fourth-year head coach Bobby Hurley, played their home games at Wells Fargo Arena in Tempe, Arizona as members of Pac–12 Conference. They finished the season 23–11, 12–6 in Pac-12 play to finish for second place. In the Pac-12 tournament, the Sun Devils defeated UCLA in the quarterfinals and lost to Oregon in the semifinals. They received an at-large bid to the NCAA tournament where they defeated St. John's in the First Four, and eventually lost in the First round to Buffalo.

== Previous season ==
The Sun Devils finished the season 20–12, 8–10 in Pac-12 play to finish in a tie for eighth place. They lost in the first round of the Pac-12 tournament to Colorado. They received an at-large bid to the NCAA tournament where they lost in the First Four to Syracuse.

== Off-season ==
=== Departures ===
Name	Pos.	Height	Weight	Year	Hometown	Reason for departure
Shannon Evans	PG	6'1"	172	RS Senior	Suffolk, Virginia	Completed athletic eligibility
Kodi Justice	SG	6'5"	190	Senior	Mesa, Arizona	Graduated
Tra Holder	PG	6'1"	180	Senior	Los Angeles, California	Graduated
Austin Witherill	PG	6'1"	170	Senior	Gilbert, Arizona	Graduated

=== 2018 recruiting class ===
College recruiting information
Name	Hometown	School	Height	Weight	Commit date
Elias Valtonen; SG	Eura, Finland	HBA-Märsky	6 ft 6 in (1.98 m)	195 lb (88 kg)	Oct 13, 2017
Elias Valtonen; SG	Recruit ratings: Scout: Rivals: 247Sports: ESPN: (80)				
Luguentz Dort; SG	Montreal, Quebec	Athlete Institute	6 ft 4 in (1.93 m)	200 lb (91 kg)	Oct 18, 2017
Luguentz Dort; SG	Recruit ratings: Scout: Rivals: 247Sports: ESPN: (92)				
Taeshon Cherry; SF	El Cajon, California	Foothills Christian High School	6 ft 8 in (2.03 m)	210 lb (95 kg)	Jan 16, 2018
Taeshon Cherry; SF	Recruit ratings: Scout: Rivals: 247Sports: ESPN: (88)				
Uroš Plavšić; C	Ivanjica, Serbia	Hamilton Heights Christian Academy	7 ft 1 in (2.16 m)	240 lb (110 kg)	Apr 26, 2018
Uroš Plavšić; C	Recruit ratings: Scout: Rivals: 247Sports: ESPN: (NR)				
Overall recruit ranking:
Note: In many cases, Scout, Rivals, 247Sports, On3, and ESPN may conflict in their listings of height and weight.; In these cases, the average was taken. ESPN grades are on a 100-point scale.; Sources: "2018 Team Ranking". Rivals.

== Roster ==
2018–19 Arizona State Sun Devils men's basketball team
Players
Coaches

Pos.	#	Name	Height	Weight	Year	Previous school	Hometown
G	0	Luguentz Dort	6 ft 4 in (1.93 m)	215 lb (98 kg)	Fr	Athlete Institute	Montreal, Quebec
G	1	Remy Martin	6 ft 0 in (1.83 m)	170 lb (77 kg)	So	Sierra Canyon School	Chatsworth, California
G	2	Rob Edwards	6 ft 4 in (1.93 m)	200 lb (91 kg)	RS Jr	Cleveland State	Detroit, Michigan
F	3	Mickey Mitchell	6 ft 7 in (2.01 m)	225 lb (102 kg)	RS Jr	Ohio State	Orlando, Florida
G	5	Kyle Feit (W)	6 ft 4 in (1.93 m)	190 lb (86 kg)	Fr	IMG Academy	West Palm Beach, Florida
F	10	Vitaliy Shibel	6 ft 9 in (2.06 m)	210 lb (95 kg)	RS So	Lee Academy	Ivano-Frankivsk, Ukraine
G	11	Elias Valtonen	6 ft 7 in (2.01 m)	195 lb (88 kg)	Fr	HBA-Märsky	Eura, Finland
F	14	Kimani Lawrence	6 ft 7 in (2.01 m)	210 lb (95 kg)	So	New Hampton School	Providence, Rhode Island
G	21	Jack Roggin (W)	6 ft 0 in (1.83 m)	165 lb (75 kg)	So	Calabasas HS	Calabasas, California
F	23	Romello White	6 ft 8 in (2.03 m)	235 lb (107 kg)	RS So	Joseph Wheeler HS	Atlanta, Georgia
G	24	Jordan Salzman (W)	5 ft 10 in (1.78 m)	175 lb (79 kg)	So	Locust Valley HS	Locust Valley, New York
G	25	Grant Fogerty (W)	6 ft 0 in (1.83 m)	175 lb (79 kg)	So	Desert Mountain HS	Scottsdale, Arizona
G	31	Trevor Thompson (W)	6 ft 2 in (1.88 m)	175 lb (79 kg)	So	Moon Valley HS	Phoenix, Arizona
F	32	De'Quon Lake	6 ft 10 in (2.08 m)	225 lb (102 kg)	Sr	Iowa Western C.C.	Charlotte Amalie, U.S. Virgin Islands
C	34	Uroš Plavšić	7 ft 0 in (2.13 m)	240 lb (109 kg)	Fr	Hamilton Heights Christian	Ivanjica, Serbia
F	35	Taeshon Cherry	6 ft 8 in (2.03 m)	210 lb (95 kg)	Fr	Foothills Christian HS	El Cajon, California
F	45	Zylan Cheatham	6 ft 8 in (2.03 m)	220 lb (100 kg)	RS Sr	San Diego State	Phoenix, Arizona

Head coach

- Bobby Hurley (Duke)

Assistant coach(es)

- Rashon Burno (DePaul)
- Anthony Coleman (Long Beach State)
- Dražen Zlovarić (Chattanooga)

Legend

- (C) Team captain
- (S) Suspended
- (I) Ineligible
- (W) Walk-on
- Injured
- Current redshirt

Roster
Last update: August 17, 2018

== Schedule and results ==
Date time, TV	Rank^{#}	Opponent^{#}	Result	Record	High points	High rebounds	High assists	Site (attendance) city, state
Exhibition
October 30, 2018*; 6:00 pm		Arizona Christian	W 104–76		17 – Cherry	11 – Tied	6 – Cheatham	Wells Fargo Arena; Tempe, AZ
Non-conference regular season
November 6, 2018*; 6:00 pm, P12N		Cal State Fullerton	W 102–94 ^{2OT}	1–0	28 – Dort	9 – Tied	3 – Tied	Wells Fargo Arena (9,145); Tempe, AZ
November 9, 2018*; 7:00 pm, P12N		McNeese State; MGM Resorts Main Event campus-site game	W 80–52	2–0	25 – Dort	12 – Cheatham	6 – Cheatham	Wells Fargo Arena (8,515); Tempe, AZ
November 12, 2018*; 7:00 pm, P12N		Long Beach State; MGM Resorts Main Event campus-site game	W 90–58	3–0	15 – Martin	12 – Dort	5 – Martin	Wells Fargo Arena (8,818); Tempe, AZ
November 16, 2018*; 6:00 pm, P12N		at San Francisco	Cancelled					War Memorial Gymnasium; San Francisco, CA
November 19, 2018*; 9:00 pm, ESPNU		vs. No. 15 Mississippi State; MGM Resorts Main Event Heavyweight semifinals	W 72–67	4–0	22 – Lawrence	9 – Tied	7 – Martin	T-Mobile Arena; Paradise, NV
November 21, 2018*; 9:00 pm, ESPNU		vs. Utah State; MGM Resorts Main Event Heavyweight championship	W 87–82	5–0	33 – Dort	7 – Dort	6 – Cheatham	T-Mobile Arena; Paradise, NV
November 28, 2018*; 7:00 pm, P12N		Omaha	W 89–71	6–0	19 – Tied	12 – Cheatham	9 – Cheatham	Wells Fargo Arena (6,951); Tempe, AZ
December 1, 2018*; 7:30 pm, P12N		Texas Southern	W 83–71	7–0	19 – White	14 – White	10 – Cheatham	Wells Fargo Arena (10,085); Tempe, AZ
December 7, 2018*; 10:00 pm, ESPN2	No. 20	vs. No. 6 Nevada; Basketball Hall of Fame Classic	L 66–72	7–1	24 – Dort	10 – Cheatham	4 – Tied	Staples Center (7,235); Los Angeles, CA
December 15, 2018*; 4:00 pm, SECN	No. 20	at Georgia	W 76–74	8–1	21 – Martin	10 – Cheatham	5 – Martin	Stegeman Coliseum (9,028); Athens, GA
December 17, 2018*; 5:00 pm, SECN	No. 18	at Vanderbilt	L 65–81	8–2	14 – Edwards	14 – Cheatham	3 – Tied	Memorial Gymnasium (9,271); Nashville, TN
December 22, 2018*; 7:00 pm, ESPN2	No. 18	No. 1 Kansas	W 80–76	9–2	15 – Edwards	11 – Cheatham	5 – Dort	Wells Fargo Arena (14,592); Tempe, AZ
December 29, 2018*; 2:00 pm, P12N	No. 17	Princeton	L 66–67	9–3	19 – Martin	11 – Whitehead	4 – Cheatham	Wells Fargo Arena (10,030); Tempe, AZ
Pac-12 regular season
January 3, 2019; 6:00 pm, P12N		Utah	L 86–96	9–4 (0–1)	22 – Martin	7 – White	6 – Martin	Wells Fargo Arena (9,128); Tempe, AZ
January 5, 2019; 4:00 pm, P12N		Colorado	W 83–61	10–4 (1–1)	19 – White	8 – White	8 – Martin	Wells Fargo Arena (10,003); Tempe, AZ
January 9, 2019; 7:00 pm, P12N		at California	W 80–66	11–4 (2–1)	24 – Martin	6 – Tied	8 – Martin	Haas Pavilion (5,827); Berkeley, CA
January 12, 2019; 4:00 pm, P12N		at Stanford	L 71–85	11–5 (2–2)	16 – Dort	12 – Cheatham	4 – Cheatham	Maples Pavilion (3,969); Stanford, CA
January 17, 2019; 8:00 pm, FS1		Oregon State	W 70–67	12–5 (3–2)	13 – Edwards	13 – Cheatham	6 – Cheatham	Wells Fargo Arena (9,705); Tempe, AZ
January 19, 2019; 7:30 pm, P12N		Oregon	W 78–64	13–5 (4–2)	17 – Cheatham	9 – Cheatham	8 – Martin	Wells Fargo Arena (12,751); Tempe, AZ
January 24, 2019; 9:00 pm, FS1		at UCLA	W 84–73	14–5 (5–2)	16 – Dort	20 – Cheatham	11 – Martin	Pauley Pavilion (7,555); Los Angeles, CA
January 26, 2019; 6:00 pm, ESPN2		at USC	L 67–69	14–6 (5–3)	11 – White	14 – Cheatham	7 – Martin	Galen Center (5,111); Los Angeles, CA
January 31, 2019; 7:00 pm, ESPN2		Arizona; Rivalry	W 95–88 ^{OT}	15–6 (6–3)	31 – Martin	22 – Cheatham	8 – Martin	Wells Fargo Arena (14,731); Tempe, AZ
February 7, 2019; 6:30 pm, P12N		Washington State	L 70–91	15–7 (6–4)	22 – Dort	16 – Cheatham	8 – Martin	Wells Fargo Arena (9,517); Tempe, AZ
February 9, 2019; 8:00 pm, ESPN		Washington	W 75–63	16–7 (7–4)	17 – White	9 – Cheatham	7 – Cheatham	Wells Fargo Arena (12,686); Tempe, AZ
February 13, 2019; 8:30 pm, FS1		at Colorado	L 73–77	16–8 (7–5)	21 – Dort	10 – Cheatham	6 – Martin	Coors Events Center (6,273); Boulder, CO
February 16, 2019; 8:30 pm, FS1		at Utah	W 98–87	17–8 (8–5)	28 – Edwards	10 – Cheatham	5 – Martin	Jon M. Huntsman Center (12,585); Salt Lake City, UT
February 20, 2019; 7:00 pm, ESPN2		Stanford	W 80–62	18–8 (9–5)	16 – Tied	5 – 4 tied	6 – Martin	Wells Fargo Arena (10,327); Tempe, AZ
February 24, 2019; 4:00 pm, P12N		California	W 69–59	19–8 (10–5)	22 – Dort	12 – Cheatham	5 – Martin	Wells Fargo Arena (11,618); Tempe, AZ
February 28, 2019; 9:00 pm, P12N		at Oregon	L 51–79	19–9 (10–6)	13 – Martin	7 – Lake	6 – Martin	Matthew Knight Arena (7,682); Eugene, OR
March 3, 2019; 6:00 pm, ESPNU		at Oregon State	W 74–71	20–9 (11–6)	20 – Dort	10 – Cheatham	4 – Martin	Gill Coliseum (6,023); Corvallis, OR
March 9, 2019; 2:00 pm, CBS		at Arizona; Rivalry	W 72–64	21–9 (12–6)	27 – Martin	8 – Martin	7 – Martin	McKale Center (14,291); Tucson, AZ
Pac-12 tournament
March 14, 2019; 6:00 pm, P12N	(2)	vs. (7) UCLA; Quarterfinals	W 83–72	22–9	19 – White	13 – Cheatham	6 – Martin	T-Mobile Arena (13,012); Paradise, NV
March 15, 2019; 8:30 pm, ESPN	(2)	vs. (6) Oregon; Semifinals	L 75–79 ^{OT}	22–10	17 – Dort	9 – Cheatham	3 – Tied	T-Mobile Arena (13,955); Paradise, NV
NCAA tournament
March 20, 2019*; 6:10 pm, truTV	(11 W)	vs. (11 W) St. John's; First Four	W 74–65	23–10	21 – Dort	10 – Cheatham	3 – Martin	UD Arena (11,827); Dayton, OH
March 22, 2019*; 4:00 pm, TNT	(11 W)	vs. (6 W) No. 15 Buffalo; First Round	L 74–91	23–11	22 – Cheatham	7 – Cheatham	3 – Tied	BOK Center (12,352); Tulsa, OK
*Non-conference game. ^{#}Rankings from AP Poll. (#) Tournament seedings in parentheses. W=West Region. All times are in Mountain Time.

== Rankings ==
Ranking movements Legend: ██ Increase in ranking ██ Decrease in ranking — = Not ranked RV = Received votes
	Week																			
Poll	Pre	1	2	3	4	5	6	7	8	9	10	11	12	13	14	15	16	17	18	Final
AP	RV	RV	RV	RV	20	20	18	17	RV	RV	RV	—	—	—	—					Not released
Coaches	—	—^	—	RV	20	20	19	18	RV	RV	RV	RV	RV	RV	RV					RV

*AP does not release post-NCAA Tournament rankings
^Coaches did not release a Week 2 poll.
