= 2018–19 USC Trojans men's basketball team =

American college basketball season

2018–19 USC Trojans men's basketball
- Conference: Pac-12 Conference
- Record: 16–17 (8–10 Pac-12)
- Head coach: Andy Enfield (6th season)
- Assistant coaches: Jason Hart (6th season); Chris Capko (3rd season); Eric Mobley (1st season)
- Home arena: Galen Center

2018–19 Pac-12 Conference men's basketball standings
| | Conf. | | | | Overall |
| Team | W | | L | PCT | W | | L | PCT |
|---|---|---|---|---|---|---|---|---|
| Washington | 15 | – | 3 | .833 | 27 | – | 9 | .750 |
| Arizona State | 12 | – | 6 | .667 | 23 | – | 11 | .676 |
| Utah | 11 | – | 7 | .611 | 17 | – | 14 | .548 |
| Oregon State | 10 | – | 8 | .556 | 18 | – | 13 | .581 |
| Colorado | 10 | – | 8 | .556 | 23 | – | 13 | .639 |
| Oregon † | 10 | – | 8 | .556 | 25 | – | 13 | .658 |
| UCLA | 9 | – | 9 | .500 | 17 | – | 16 | .515 |
| USC | 8 | – | 10 | .444 | 16 | – | 17 | .485 |
| Arizona | 8 | – | 10 | .444 | 17 | – | 15 | .531 |
| Stanford | 8 | – | 10 | .444 | 15 | – | 16 | .484 |
| Washington State | 4 | – | 14 | .222 | 11 | – | 21 | .344 |
| California | 3 | – | 15 | .167 | 8 | – | 23 | .258 |
† Pac-12 Conference tournament winner

The 2018–19 USC Trojans men's basketball team represented the University of Southern California during the 2018–19 NCAA Division I men's basketball season. Led by sixth-year head coach Andy Enfield, they played their home games at the Galen Center in Los Angeles, California as members of the Pac-12 Conference.

== Previous season ==
The Trojans finished the season 24–12, 12–6 in Pac-12 play to finish in second place. As the No. 2 seed in the Pac-12 tournament, they defeated Oregon State in the quarterfinals and Oregon in the semifinals before losing to Arizona in the championship game. They were one of the last four teams not selected for the NCAA tournament and as a result earned a No. 1 seed in the National Invitation Tournament, where they defeated UNC Asheville in the first round before losing to Western Kentucky in the second round.

== Offseason ==
=== Departures ===
| Name | Pos. | Height | Weight | Year | Hometown | Reason for departure |
|---|---|---|---|---|---|---|
| Kurt Karis | G | 6'1" | 195 | RS Senior | Northbrook, Illinois | Graduated |
| Elijah Stewart | G | 6'5" | 195 | Senior | Deridder, Louisiana | Graduated |
| Jordan McLaughlin | G | 6'1" | 185 | Senior | Etiwanda, California | Graduated |
| Chimezie Metu | F | 6'11" | 225 | Junior | Lawndale, California | Declared for 2018 NBA draft |
| Harrison Henderson | F | 6'10" | 225 | Sophomore | Dallas, Texas | Transferred |

=== 2018 recruiting class ===
College recruiting information
| Name | Hometown | School | Height | Weight | Commit date |
|---|---|---|---|---|---|
| Kevin Porter Jr. SG | Seattle, WA | Rainier Beach HS | 6 ft 5 in (1.96 m) | 200 lb (91 kg) | Feb 7, 2017 |
| Kevin Porter Jr. SG | Recruit ratings: Scout: Rivals: 247Sports: ESPN: (89) | | | | |
| Elijah Weaver; PG | Oldsmar, FL | Oldsmar Christian School | 6 ft 4 in (1.93 m) | 195 lb (88 kg) | Oct 23, 2017 |
| Elijah Weaver; PG | Recruit ratings: Scout: Rivals: 247Sports: ESPN: (89) | | | | |
| J'Raan Brooks; PF | Seattle, WA | Garfield HS | 6 ft 8 in (2.03 m) | 215 lb (98 kg) | Mar 11, 2018 |
| J'Raan Brooks; PF | Recruit ratings: Scout: Rivals: 247Sports: ESPN: (84) | | | | |
Overall recruit ranking:
Note: In many cases, Scout, Rivals, 247Sports, On3, and ESPN may conflict in their listings of height and weight.; In these cases, the average was taken. ESPN grades are on a 100-point scale.; Sources: "2018 Team Ranking". Rivals.

College recruiting information (2019)
| Name | Hometown | School | Height | Weight | Commit date |
|---|---|---|---|---|---|
| Onyeka Okongwu; C | Chino Hills, CA | Chino Hills HS | 6 ft 8 in (2.03 m) | 235 lb (107 kg) | May 14, 2018 |
| Onyeka Okongwu; C | Recruit ratings: Scout: Rivals: 247Sports: ESPN: | | | | |
| Isaiah Mobley; PF | Temecula, CA | Rancho Christian School | 6 ft 9 in (2.06 m) | 220 lb (100 kg) | May 18, 2018 |
| Isaiah Mobley; PF | Recruit ratings: Scout: Rivals: 247Sports: ESPN: | | | | |
| Drake London; SG | Moorpark, CA | Moorpark HS | 6 ft 4 in (1.93 m) | 200 lb (91 kg) | Jun 27, 2018 |
| Drake London; SG | Recruit ratings: Scout: Rivals: 247Sports: ESPN: | | | | |
| Max Agbonkpolo; SF | Rancho Santa Margarita, CA | Santa Margarita Catholic | 6 ft 8 in (2.03 m) | 180 lb (82 kg) | Jul 6, 2018 |
| Max Agbonkpolo; SF | Recruit ratings: Scout: Rivals: 247Sports: ESPN: | | | | |
| Kyle Sturdivant; PG | Norcross, GA | Norcross HS | 6 ft 3 in (1.91 m) | 190 lb (86 kg) | Sep 20, 2018 |
| Kyle Sturdivant; PG | Recruit ratings: Scout: Rivals: 247Sports: ESPN: | | | | |
| Ethan Anderson; PG | Los Angeles, CA | Fairfax Senior | 6 ft 1 in (1.85 m) | 195 lb (88 kg) | Mar 22, 2019 |
| Ethan Anderson; PG | Recruit ratings: Scout: Rivals: 247Sports: ESPN: | | | | |
Overall recruit ranking:
Note: In many cases, Scout, Rivals, 247Sports, On3, and ESPN may conflict in their listings of height and weight.; In these cases, the average was taken. ESPN grades are on a 100-point scale.; Sources: "2019 USC Commits". Rivals.; "2019 Team Ranking". Rivals.

== Roster ==
2018–19 USC Trojans men's basketball team
Players
Coaches

| Pos. | # | Name | Height | Weight | Year | Previous school | Hometown |
|---|---|---|---|---|---|---|---|
| G | 0 | Shaqquan Aaron | 6 ft 7 in (2.01 m) | 195 lb (88 kg) | RS Sr | Louisville | Seattle, Washington |
| G | 2 | Jonah Mathews | 6 ft 3 in (1.91 m) | 200 lb (91 kg) | Jr | Santa Monica HS | Santa Monica, California |
| F | 3 | Elijah Weaver | 6 ft 6 in (1.98 m) | 210 lb (95 kg) | Fr | Rockledge HS | Cocoa, Florida |
| G | 4 | Kevin Porter Jr. | 6 ft 6 in (1.98 m) | 218 lb (99 kg) | Fr | Rainier Beach HS | Seattle, Washington |
| G | 5 | Derryck Thornton | 6 ft 2 in (1.88 m) | 195 lb (88 kg) | RS Jr | Duke | Los Angeles, California |
| G | 12 | Devin Fleming (W) | 6 ft 2 in (1.88 m) | 190 lb (86 kg) | Sr | Valley View HS | Moreno Valley, California |
| G | 13 | Charles O'Bannon Jr. (injured) | 6 ft 6 in (1.98 m) | 210 lb (95 kg) | So | Bishop Gorman HS | Las Vegas, Nevada |
| G | 15 | McKay Anderson (W) | 6 ft 5 in (1.96 m) | 190 lb (86 kg) | Jr | Pasadena City College | La Cañada, California |
| F | 25 | Bennie Boatwright | 6 ft 10 in (2.08 m) | 235 lb (107 kg) | Sr | Village Christian | Mission Hills, California |
| C | 31 | Nick Rakocevic | 6 ft 11 in (2.11 m) | 230 lb (104 kg) | Jr | St. Joseph HS | Chicago, Illinois |
| F | 33 | J'Raan Brooks | 6 ft 9 in (2.06 m) | 220 lb (100 kg) | Fr | Garfield HS | Seattle, Washington |
| C | 34 | Victor Uyaelunmo | 6 ft 11 in (2.11 m) | 220 lb (100 kg) | So | Calvary Christian HS | Miami, Florida |

Head coach

- Andy Enfield (Johns Hopkins)

Assistant coach(es)

- Jason Hart (Syracuse)
- Chris Capko (South Florida)
- Eric Mobley (Portland)

Legend

- (C) Team captain
- (S) Suspended
- (I) Ineligible
- (W) Walk-on
- Injured
- Current redshirt

Roster

- Sophomore Forward Jordan Usher transferred to Georgia Tech on December 31, 2018 after being suspended indefinitely for "unspecified conduct issues."

== Schedule and results ==
| Date time, TV | Rank^{#} | Opponent^{#} | Result | Record | High points | High rebounds | High assists | Site (attendance) city, state |
Non-conference regular season
| November 6, 2018*; 8:00 pm, P12N | | Robert Morris; Hall of Fame Classic campus-site game | W 83–62 | 1–0 | 20 – Aaron | 16 – Rakocevic | 6 – Mathews | Galen Center (2,502); Los Angeles, CA |
| November 11, 2018*; 6:00 pm, P12N | | Vanderbilt | L 78–82 | 1–1 | 19 – Rakocevic | 18 – Rakocevic | 2 – Tied | Galen Center (3,804); Los Angeles, CA |
| November 14, 2018*; 7:00 pm, P12N | | Stetson; Hall of Fame Classic campus-site game | W 95–59 | 2–1 | 16 – Tied | 12 – Rakocevic | 3 – Tied | Galen Center (1,533); Los Angeles, CA |
| November 19, 2018*; 6:30 pm, ESPN2 | | vs. Texas Tech; Hall of Fame Classic semifinals | L 63–78 | 2–2 | 15 – Porter | 9 – Rakocevic | 4 – Thornton | Sprint Center; Kansas City, MO |
| November 20, 2018*; 4:00 pm, ESPN3 | | vs. Missouri State; Hall of Fame Classic consolation | W 99–80 | 3–2 | 22 – Boatwright | 7 – Tied | 6 – Thornton | Sprint Center; Kansas City, MO |
| November 25, 2018*; 4:00 pm, P12N | | Cal State Bakersfield | W 90–75 | 4–2 | 22 – Usher | 9 – Usher | 5 – Weaver | Galen Center (2,348); Los Angeles, CA |
| November 28, 2018*; 8:00 pm, P12N | | Long Beach State | W 75–65 | 5–2 | 19 – Rakocevic | 12 – Rakocevic | 6 – Thornton | Galen Center (2,031); Los Angeles, CA |
| December 1, 2018*; 1:30 pm, FOX | | No. 5 Nevada | L 61–73 | 5–3 | 20 – Rakocevic | 12 – Rakocevic | 4 – Tied | Galen Center (5,844); Los Angeles, CA |
| December 7, 2018*; 6:30 pm, FS1 | | vs. TCU; Basketball Hall of Fame Classic | L 61–96 | 5–4 | 14 – Boatwright | 7 – Rakocevic | 7 – Thornton | Staples Center; Los Angeles, CA |
| December 15, 2018*; 6:00 pm, ESPNU | | vs. Oklahoma; Tulsa Showcase | L 70–81 | 5–5 | 17 – Rakocevic | 15 – Rakocevic | 4 – Thornton | BOK Center (7,170); Tulsa, OK |
| December 18, 2018*; 7:00 pm | | at Santa Clara | L 92–102 ^{2OT} | 5–6 | 22 – Usher | 9 – Boatwright | 5 – Matthews | Leavey Center (2,226); Santa Clara, CA |
| December 21, 2018*; 8:00 pm, P12N | | Southern Utah | W 91–49 | 6–6 | 21 – Rakocevic | 10 – Boatwright | 8 – Thornton | Galen Center (3,125); Los Angeles, CA |
| December 30, 2018*; 6:00 pm, P12N | | UC Davis | W 73–55 | 7–6 | 19 – Boatwright | 8 – Boatwright | 7 – Matthews | Galen Center (3,127); Los Angeles, CA |
Pac-12 regular season
| January 3, 2019; 7:00 pm, P12N | | California | W 82–73 | 8–6 (1–0) | 27 – Rakocevic | 8 – Rakocevic | 12 – Thornton | Galen Center (3,371); Los Angeles, CA |
| January 6, 2019; 5:00 pm, ESPNU | | Stanford | W 77–66 | 9–6 (2–0) | 23 – Rakocevic | 10 – Rakocevic | 9 – Thornton | Galen Center (3,768); Los Angeles, CA |
| January 10, 2019; 8:00 pm, ESPNU | | at Oregon State | L 74–79 ^{OT} | 9–7 (2–1) | 37 – Boatwright | 8 – Boatwright | 3 – Rakocevic | Gill Coliseum (4,935); Corvallis, OR |
| January 13, 2019; 5:00 pm, ESPNU | | at Oregon | L 60–81 | 9–8 (2–2) | 15 – Mathews | 8 – Boatwright | 5 – Weaver | Matthew Knight Arena (8,148); Eugene, OR |
| January 19, 2019; 1:00 pm, CBS | | UCLA; Rivalry | W 80–67 | 10–8 (3–2) | 21 – Tied | 12 – Rakocevic | 7 – Aaron | Galen Center (5,226); Los Angeles, CA |
| January 24, 2019; 6:00 pm, FS1 | | Arizona | W 80–57 | 11–8 (4–2) | 27 – Rakocevic | 12 – Tied | 5 – Tied | Galen Center (4,125); Los Angeles, CA |
| January 26, 2019; 5:00 pm, ESPN2 | | Arizona State | W 69–67 | 12–8 (5–2) | 17 – Boatwright | 9 – Rakocevic | 6 – Thornton | Galen Center (5,111); Los Angeles, CA |
| January 30, 2019; 8:00 pm, FS1 | | at Washington | L 62–75 | 12–9 (5–3) | 22 – Boatwright | 10 – Rakocevic | 4 – Tied | Alaska Airlines Arena (9,121); Seattle, WA |
| February 2, 2019; 4:00 pm, P12N | | at Washington State | W 93–84 | 13–9 (6–3) | 25 – Rakocevic | 13 – Rakocevic | 6 – Thornton | Beasley Coliseum (2,559); Pullman, WA |
| February 6, 2019; 8:00 pm, P12N | | Utah | L 70–77 | 13–10 (6–4) | 18 – Mathews | 12 – Boatwright | 4 – Thornton | Galen Center (2,952); Los Angeles, CA |
| February 9, 2019; 7:00 pm, ESPNU | | Colorado | L 65–69 | 13–11 (6–5) | 24 – Boatwright | 7 – Thornton | 4 – Boatwright | Galen Center (3,974); Los Angeles, CA |
| February 13, 2019; 8:00 pm, ESPNU | | at Stanford | L 76–79 | 13–12 (6–6) | 19 – Boatwright | 11 – Rakocevic | 3 – Tied | Maples Pavilion (5,052); Stanford, CA |
| February 16, 2019; 5:00 pm, P12N | | at California | W 89–66 | 14–12 (7–6) | 36 – Boatwright | 11 – Rakocevic | 7 – Thornton | Haas Pavilion (7,345); Berkeley, CA |
| February 21, 2019; 6:00 pm, ESPN | | Oregon | W 66–49 | 15–12 (8–6) | 20 – Boatwright | 6 – Tied | 3 – Tied | Galen Center (3,425); Los Angeles, CA |
| February 23, 2019; 3:00 pm, P12N | | Oregon State | L 62–67 | 15–13 (8–7) | 15 – Matthews | 10 – Porter Jr. | 6 – Thornton | Galen Center (4,772); Los Angeles, CA |
| February 28, 2019; 6:00 pm, ESPN | | at UCLA; Rivalry | L 88–93 ^{OT} | 15–14 (8–8) | 25 – Boatwright | 15 – Boatwright | 7 – Aaron | Pauley Pavilion (12,427); Los Angeles, CA |
| March 7, 2019; 7:00 pm, FS1 | | at Utah | L 74–83 | 15–15 (8–9) | 20 – Boatwright | 8 – Rakocevic | 5 – Weaver | Jon M. Huntsman Center (11,007); Salt Lake City, UT |
| March 9, 2019; 2:00 pm, P12N | | at Colorado | L 67–78 | 15–16 (8–10) | 17 – Rakocevic | 10 – Rakocevic | 4 – Weaver | CU Events Center (9,379); Boulder, CO |
Pac-12 tournament
| March 13, 2019; 12:00 pm, P12N | (8) | vs. (9) Arizona; First round | W 78–65 | 16–16 | 22 – Boatwright | 11 – Boatwright | 4 – Boatwright | T-Mobile Arena; Paradise, NV |
| March 14, 2019; 12:00 pm, P12N | (8) | vs. (1) Washington; Quarterfinals | L 75–78 | 16–17 | 17 – Tied | 17 – Rakocevic | 7 – Boatwright | T-Mobile Arena; Paradise, NV |
*Non-conference game. ^{#}Rankings from AP Poll. (#) Tournament seedings in parentheses. All times are in Pacific Time.
