= 2018–19 Pac-12 Conference men's basketball season =

2018–19 Pac–12 men's basketball season
- League: NCAA Division I
- Sport: Basketball
- Teams: 12
- TV partner(s): ESPN, ESPN2, ESPNU, Fox Sports 1, FOX, Pac-12 Network, CBS

Regular season
- Regular season champions: Washington
- Season MVP: Jaylen Nowell, Washington
- Top scorer: Tres Tinkle, Oregon State

Pac-12 tournament
- Champions: Oregon
- Runners-up: Washington
- Tournament MVP: Payton Pritchard, Oregon

Pac-12 men's basketball seasons
- ← 2017–18 2019–20 →

2018–19 Pac-12 Conference men's basketball standings
| | Conf. | | | | Overall |
| Team | W | | L | PCT | W | | L | PCT |
|---|---|---|---|---|---|---|---|---|
| Washington | 15 | – | 3 | .833 | 27 | – | 9 | .750 |
| Arizona State | 12 | – | 6 | .667 | 23 | – | 11 | .676 |
| Utah | 11 | – | 7 | .611 | 17 | – | 14 | .548 |
| Oregon State | 10 | – | 8 | .556 | 18 | – | 13 | .581 |
| Colorado | 10 | – | 8 | .556 | 23 | – | 13 | .639 |
| Oregon † | 10 | – | 8 | .556 | 25 | – | 13 | .658 |
| UCLA | 9 | – | 9 | .500 | 17 | – | 16 | .515 |
| USC | 8 | – | 10 | .444 | 16 | – | 17 | .485 |
| Arizona | 8 | – | 10 | .444 | 17 | – | 15 | .531 |
| Stanford | 8 | – | 10 | .444 | 15 | – | 16 | .484 |
| Washington State | 4 | – | 14 | .222 | 11 | – | 21 | .344 |
| California | 3 | – | 15 | .167 | 8 | – | 23 | .258 |
† Pac-12 Conference tournament winner

The 2018–19 Pac-12 Conference men's basketball season began with practices in October 2018 followed by the 2018–19 NCAA Division I men's basketball season on November 6, 2018. The conference schedule will begin in December 2018. This is the seventh season under the Pac–12 Conference name and the 59th since the conference was established under its current charter as the Athletic Association of Western Universities in 1959. Including the history of the Pacific Coast Conference, which operated from 1915 to 1959 and is considered by the Pac-12 as a part of its own history, this is the Pac-12's 103rd season of basketball.

The Pac-12 tournament was held from March 13–16, 2019, at the T-Mobile Arena in Paradise, Nevada.

== Pre-season ==
=== Recruiting classes ===
Rankings
| Team | ESPN | Rivals | Scout | 247Sports | Signees |
|---|---|---|---|---|---|
| Arizona | No. 31 | No. 35 | No. 19 | No. 22 | 3 |
| Arizona State | No. 19 | No. 24 | No. 7 | No. 11 | 4 |
| California | - | No. 41 | No. 34 | No. 44 | 4 |
| Colorado | - | No. 92 | No. 97 | No. 85 | 3 |
| Oregon | No. 4 | No. 4 | No. 3 | No. 3 | 5 |
| Oregon State | - | No. 52 | No. 71 | No. 84 | 3 |
| Stanford | No. 28 | No. 26 | No. 22 | No. 20 | 5 |
| UCLA | No. 3 | No. 5 | No. 10 | No. 6 | 6 |
| USC | No. 15 | No. 21 | No. 14 | No. 18 | 3 |
| Utah | - | No. 29 | No. 35 | No. 39 | 6 |
| Washington | No. 23 | No. 33 | No. 43 | No. 40 | 5 |
| Washington State | - | - | No. 136 | No. 145 | 1 |

=== Preseason watchlists ===
Below is a table of notable preseason watch lists.

| | Wooden | Naismith | Cousy | Erving | Malone | Abdul-Jabbar |
| Bennie Boatwright | ✓ | ✓ | | | ✓ | |
| Bol Bol | | ✓ | | | | ✓ |
| Moses Brown | | | | | | ✓ |
| Noah Dickerson | | | | | ✓ | |
| Robert Franks | | | | ✓ | | |
| Louis King | | | | ✓ | | |
| Jaylen Hands | | | ✓ | | | |
| Payton Pritchard | ✓ | | ✓ | | | |
| Tres Tinkle | | | | ✓ | | |
| Matisse Thybulle | | | | ✓ | | |
| Kris Wilkes | ✓ | ✓ | | ✓ | | |

=== Preseason All-American teams ===
| ESPN | CBS | AP | USA | Blue; Ribbon | Athlon; Sports | NBC; Sports | Street & Smith's | Sporting News | Sports; Illustrated |

=== Preseason polls ===
| | AP | Athlon; Sports | Bleacher; Report | Blue Ribbon; Yearbook | CBS Sports | Coaches | ESPN | KenPom | Lindy's; Sports | NBC Sports | SBNation | Sporting; News | Street & Smith's | Sports; Illustrated | USBWA |
| Arizona | | | | | No. 42 | No. 39 | | No. 76 | No. 16 | | | No. 25 | | No. 49 | |
| Arizona State | | | | | No. 60 | | | No. 53 | | | | | | No. 62 | |
| California | | | | | No. 190 | | | No. 157 | | | | | | No. 229 | |
| Colorado | | | No. 24 | | No. 75 | | | No. 81 | | | | | | No. 60 | |
| Oregon | No. 14 | No. 18 | No. 18 | No. 9 | No. 12 | No. 16 | | No. 27 | No. 13 | No. 18 | No. 16 | No. 15 | | No. 16 | |
| Oregon State | | | | | No. 77 | | | No. 90 | | | | | | No. 82 | |
| Stanford | | | | | No. 111 | | | No. 105 | | | | | | No. 106 | |
| UCLA | No. 21 | No. 14 | No. 17 | No. 14 | No. 24 | No. 20 | | No. 47 | No. 22 | No. 16 | No. 14 | No. 14 | | No. 21 | |
| USC | | | | | No. 35 | No. 38 | | No. 61 | | | No. 35 | | | No. 48 | |
| Utah | | | | | No. 81 | | | No. 73 | | | | | | No. 76 | |
| Washington | No. 25 | No. 21 | | | No. 22 | No. 24 | | No. 46 | | No. 29 | No. 33 | | | No. 28 | |
| Washington State | | | | | No. 181 | | | No. 179 | | | | | | No. 247 | |

=== Pac-12 Media days ===
Men’s Basketball Media Preseason Poll
| Place | Team | Points | First place votes |
|---|---|---|---|
| 1. | Oregon | 288 pts | 16 |
| 2. | UCLA | 264 pts | 6 |
| 3. | Washington | 249 pts | 2 |
| 4. | Arizona | 205 pts | 1 |
| 5. | USC | 203 pts | -- |
| 6. | Arizona State | 165 pts | -- |
| 7. | Colorado | 161 pts | -- |
| 8. | Utah | 122 pts | -- |
| 9. | Stanford | 109 pts | -- |
| 10. | Oregon State | 102 pts | -- |
| 11. | California | 45 pts | -- |
| 12. | Washington State | 35 pts | -- |
(first place votes)

- October 11–12, 2018 – Pac-12 Men's Basketball Media Day, Pac-12 Networks Studios, San Francisco, Calif.

=== Early season tournaments ===
| Team | Tournament | Finish |
|---|---|---|
| Arizona | Maui Invitational | 4th |
| Arizona State | MGM Resorts Main Event | 1st |
| California | Legends Classic | 4th |
| Colorado | Diamond Head Classic | 7th |
| Oregon | 2K Sports Classic | 3rd |
| Oregon State | Paradise Jam | 3rd |
| Stanford | Battle 4 Atlantis | 7th |
| UCLA | Las Vegas Invitational | 4th |
| USC | CBE Hall of Fame Classic | 3rd |
| Utah | Wooden Legacy | 6th |
| Washington | Vancouver Showcase | 2nd |
| Washington State | Las Vegas Classic | 4th |

=== Midseason watchlists ===
Below is a table of notable midseason watch lists.

== Regular season ==
The Schedule will be released in late September. Before the season, it was announced that for the sixth consecutive season, all regular season conference games and conference tournament games would be broadcast nationally by CBS Sports, FOX Sports, ESPN Inc. family of networks including ESPN, ESPN2 and ESPNU, and the Pac-12 Network.

=== Records against other conferences ===
2018-19 records against non-conference foes as of (Jan. 2, 2018):

Regular season

| Power Conferences | Record |
|---|---|
| ACC | 2–3 |
| Big East | 0–1 |
| Big Ten | 0–7 |
| Big 12 | 2–7 |
| SEC | 4–8 |
| Power Conference Total | 8–26 |
| Other NCAA Division 1 Conferences | Record |
| America East | 2–0 |
| American | 1–4 |
| A-10 | 0–1 |
| ASUN | 1–1 |
| Big Sky | 9–2 |
| Big South | 2–0 |
| Big West | 15–2 |
| CAA | 1–0 |
| C-USA | 5–0 |
| Horizon | 3–0 |
| Ivy League | 1–2 |
| MAAC | 1–0 |
| MAC | 1–0 |
| MEAC | 3–0 |
| MVC | 3–1 |
| Mountain West | 10–3 |
| NEC | 3–0 |
| OVC | 1–1 |
| Patriot League | 0–0 |
| SoCon | 0–0 |
| Southland | 3–0 |
| SWAC | 1–1 |
| The Summit | 5–0 |
| Sun Belt | 1–0 |
| WAC | 5–4 |
| WCC | 8–10 |
| Other Division I Total | 85–32 |
| Division II Total | 0–0 |
| NCAA Division I Total | 93–58 |

=== Record against ranked non-conference opponents ===
This is a list of games against ranked opponents only (Rankings from the AP Poll):

| Date | Visitor | Home | Site | Significance | Score | Conference record |
|---|---|---|---|---|---|---|
| November 9 | No. 25 Washington | No. 11 Auburn | Auburn Arena • Auburn, AL | | L 66-88 | 0–1 |
| November 12 | Stanford | No. 7 North Carolina | Dean Smith Center • Chapel Hill, NC | | L 72-90 | 0–2 |
| November 19 | No.15 Syracuse | No.13 Oregon† | Madison Square Garden • New York, NY | 2K Sports Classic | W 80–65 | 1–2 |
| November 19 | No.15 Mississippi State | Arizona State† | T-Mobile Arena • Paradise, NV | MGM Resorts Main Event | W 72–67 | 2–2 |
| November 20 | No.3 Gonzaga | Arizona† | Lahaina Civic Center • Maui, HI | Maui Invitational tournament | L 74–91 | 2–3 |
| November 21 | No.8 Auburn | Arizona† | Lahaina Civic Center • Maui, HI | Maui Invitational Tournament | L 57–73 | 2–4 |
| November 21 | No.25 Wisconsin | Stanford† | Imperial Arena • Nassau, Bahamas | Battle 4 Atlantis | L 46–62 | 2–5 |
| November 22 | No.11 Michigan State | No. 17 UCLA† | Orleans Arena • Paradise, NV | Las Vegas Invitational | L 67–87 | 2–5 |
| November 23 | No.7 North Carolina | No. 17 UCLA† | Orleans Arena • Paradise, NV | Las Vegas Invitational | L 78–94 | 2–6 |
| December 1 | No.5 Nevada | USC | Galen Center • Los Angeles, CA | | L 61–73 | 2–7 |
| December 1 | Stanford | No.2 Kansas | Allen Fieldhouse • Lawrence, KS | | L 84–90OT | 2–8 |
| December 5 | Washington | No.1 Gonzaga | McCarthey Athletic Center • Spokane, WA | | L 79–81 | 2–9 |
| December 7 | No.6 Nevada | No.20 Arizona State† | Staples Center • Los Angeles, CA | Air Force Reserve Basketball Hall of Fame Classic | L 66–72 | 2–10 |
| December 15 | Utah | No.19 Kentucky | Rupp Arena • Lexington, KY | | L 61–88 | 2–11 |
| December 15 | No. 13 Virginia Tech | Washington† | Boardwalk Hall • Atlantic City, NJ | Air Force Reserve Basketball Hall of Fame Boardwalk Classic | L 61–73 | 2–12 |
| December 22 | No. 15 Ohio State | UCLA† | United Center • Chicago, IL | CBS Sports Classic | L 66–80 | 2–13 |
| December 22 | No. 1 Kansas | No.18 Arizona State | Wells Fargo Arena • Tempe, AZ | | W 80–76 | 3–13 |
| December 29 | No.6 Nevada | Utah | Jon M. Huntsman Center • Salt Lake City, UT | | L 71–86 | 3–14 |
| March 22 | Arizona State† | No. 15 Buffalo | BOK Center • Tulsa, OK | NCAA First Round | L 74–91 | 3–15 |
| March 22 | Oregon† | No. 21 Wisconsin | SAP Center • San Jose, CA | NCAA First Round | W 72–54 | 4–15 |
| March 22 | Washington† | No. 25 Utah State | Nationwide Arena • Columbus, OH | NCAA First Round | W 78–61 | 5–15 |
| March 24 | Washington† | No. 3 North Carolina | Nationwide Arena • Columbus, OH | NCAA Second Round | L 59–81 | 5–16 |
| March 28 | Oregon† | No. 2 Virginia | KFC Yum! Center • Louisville, KY | NCAA Third Round | L 49–53 | 5–17 |

Team rankings are reflective of AP poll when the game was played, not current or final ranking

† denotes game was played on neutral site

=== Conference schedule ===
This table summarizes the head-to-head results between teams in conference play.

| | Arizona | Arizona St | California | Colorado | Oregon | Oregon St | Stanford | UCLA | USC | Utah | Washington | Washington St |
|---|---|---|---|---|---|---|---|---|---|---|---|---|
| vs. Arizona | – | 2–0 | 0–2 | 1–1 | 2–0 | 0–2 | 0–2 | 1–0 | 1–0 | 1–1 | 1–0 | 1–0 |
| vs. Arizona State | 0–2 | – | 0–2 | 1–1 | 1–1 | 0–2 | 1–1 | 0–1 | 1–0 | 1–1 | 0–1 | 1–0 |
| vs. California | 2–0 | 2–0 | – | 1–0 | 1–0 | 1–0 | 1–1 | 2–0 | 2–0 | 1–0 | 1–1 | 1–1 |
| vs. Colorado | 1–1 | 1–1 | 0–1 | – | 0–1 | 1–0 | 1–0 | 0–2 | 0–1 | 1–1 | 2–0 | 1–1 |
| vs. Oregon | 0–2 | 1–1 | 0–1 | 1–0 | – | 2–0 | 0–1 | 2–0 | 0–1 | 0–1 | 1–1 | 0–2 |
| vs. Oregon State | 2–0 | 2–0 | 0–1 | 0–1 | 0–2 | – | 1–0 | 1–1 | 0–2 | 0–1 | 2–0 | 0–2 |
| vs. Stanford | 2–0 | 1–1 | 1–1 | 0–1 | 1–0 | 0–1 | – | 1–1 | 1–1 | 1–0 | 2–0 | 0–2 |
| vs. UCLA | 0–1 | 1–0 | 0–2 | 2–0 | 0–2 | 1–1 | 1–1 | – | 1–1 | 2–0 | 1–0 | 0–1 |
| vs. USC | 0–1 | 0–1 | 0–2 | 2–0 | 1–1 | 2–0 | 1–1 | 1–1 | – | 1–0 | 1–0 | 0–1 |
| vs. Utah | 1–1 | 1–1 | 0–1 | 1–1 | 1–0 | 1–0 | 0–1 | 0–2 | 0–2 | – | 2–0 | 0–2 |
| vs. Washington | 0–1 | 1–0 | 1–1 | 0–2 | 1–1 | 0–2 | 0–2 | 0–1 | 0–1 | 0–2 | – | 0–2 |
| vs. Washington State | 0–1 | 0–1 | 1–1 | 1–1 | 2–0 | 2–0 | 2–0 | 1–0 | 1–0 | 2–0 | 2–0 | – |
| Total | 8–10 | 12–6 | 3–15 | 10–8 | 10–8 | 10–8 | 8–10 | 9–9 | 8–10 | 11–7 | 15–3 | 4–14 |

=== Points scored ===
| Team | For | Against | Difference |
|---|---|---|---|
| Arizona | 2,204 | 2,127 | 77 |
| Arizona State | 2,332 | 2,187 | 145 |
| California | 2,070 | 2,331 | -261 |
| Colorado | 2,249 | 2,053 | 196 |
| Oregon | 2,170 | 1,975 | 195 |
| Oregon State | 2,217 | 2,092 | 125 |
| Stanford | 2,183 | 2,148 | 35 |
| UCLA | 2,429 | 2,412 | 17 |
| USC | 2,365 | 2,267 | 98 |
| Utah | 2,289 | 2,245 | 44 |
| Washington | 2,182 | 1,985 | 197 |
| Washington State | 2,342 | 2,433 | -91 |

Through March 11, 2019

=== Rankings ===
| | Improvement in ranking |
| | Drop in ranking |
| RV | Received votes but were not ranked in Top 25 |
| NV | No votes received |

| | | Pre | Wk 2 | Wk 3 | Wk 4 | Wk 5 | Wk 6 | Wk 7 | Wk 8 | Wk 9 | Wk 10 | Wk 11 | Wk 12 | Wk 13 | Wk 14 | Wk 15 | Wk 16 | Wk 17 | Wk 18 | Wk 19 | Final |
|---|---|---|---|---|---|---|---|---|---|---|---|---|---|---|---|---|---|---|---|---|---|
| Arizona | AP | RV | RV | NV | NV | RV | NV | NV | NV | NV | NV | RV | NV | NV | NV | NV | NV | NV | NV | NV | − |
| Arizona | C | RV | RV | RV | NV | NV | RV | NV | NV | NV | NV | RV | NV | NV | NV | NV | NV | NV | NV | NV | NV |
| Arizona State | AP | RV | RV | RV | RV | 20 | 20 | 18 | 17 | RV | RV | NV | NV | NV | NV | NV | NV | NV | NV | NV | − |
| Arizona State | C | NV | NV | NV | RV | 20 | 20 | 19 | 17 | RV | RV | RV | RV | RV | RV | RV | RV | RV | RV | RV | RV |
| California | AP | NV | NV | NV | NV | NV | NV | NV | NV | NV | NV | NV | NV | NV | NV | NV | NV | NV | NV | NV | − |
| California | C | NV | NV | NV | NV | NV | NV | NV | NV | NV | NV | NV | NV | NV | NV | NV | NV | NV | NV | NV | NV |
| Colorado | AP | NV | NV | NV | NV | NV | NV | NV | NV | NV | NV | NV | NV | NV | NV | NV | NV | NV | NV | NV | − |
| Colorado | C | NV | NV | NV | NV | NV | NV | NV | NV | NV | NV | NV | NV | NV | NV | NV | NV | NV | NV | NV | NV |
| Oregon | AP | 14 | 13 | 21 | 18 | RV | NV | NV | NV | NV | NV | NV | NV | NV | NV | NV | NV | NV | NV | NV | − |
| Oregon | C | 16 | 16 | 20 | 21 | RV | NV | NV | NV | NV | NV | NV | NV | NV | NV | NV | NV | NV | NV | NV | 21 |
| Oregon State | AP | NV | NV | NV | NV | NV | NV | NV | NV | NV | NV | NV | NV | NV | NV | NV | NV | NV | NV | NV | − |
| Oregon State | C | NV | NV | NV | NV | NV | NV | NV | NV | NV | NV | NV | NV | NV | NV | NV | NV | NV | NV | NV | NV |
| Stanford | AP | NV | NV | NV | NV | NV | NV | NV | NV | NV | NV | NV | NV | NV | NV | NV | NV | NV | NV | NV | − |
| Stanford | C | NV | NV | NV | NV | NV | NV | NV | NV | NV | NV | NV | NV | NV | NV | NV | NV | NV | NV | NV | NV |
| UCLA | AP | 21 | 20 | 17 | RV | RV | RV | NV | NV | NV | NV | NV | NV | NV | NV | NV | NV | NV | NV | NV | − |
| UCLA | C | 20 | 20 | 17 | RV | RV | RV | NV | NV | NV | NV | NV | NV | NV | NV | NV | NV | NV | NV | NV | NV |
| USC | AP | RV | NV | NV | NV | NV | NV | NV | NV | NV | NV | NV | NV | NV | NV | NV | NV | NV | NV | NV | − |
| USC | C | RV | RV | NV | NV | NV | NV | NV | NV | NV | NV | NV | NV | NV | NV | NV | NV | NV | NV | NV | NV |
| Utah | AP | NV | NV | NV | NV | NV | NV | NV | NV | NV | NV | NV | NV | NV | NV | NV | NV | NV | NV | NV | − |
| Utah | C | NV | NV | NV | NV | NV | NV | NV | NV | NV | NV | NV | NV | NV | NV | NV | NV | NV | NV | NV | NV |
| Washington | AP | 25 | RV | RV | NV | NV | NV | NV | NV | NV | NV | RV | RV | RV | RV | RV | RV | 25 | RV | NV | − |
| Washington | C | 24 | 24 | RV | NV | NV | NV | NV | NV | NV | NV | RV | RV | RV | RV | RV | RV | T-25 | RV | RV | RV |
| Washington State | AP | NV | NV | NV | NV | NV | NV | NV | NV | NV | NV | NV | NV | NV | NV | NV | NV | NV | NV | NV | − |
| Washington State | C | NV | NV | NV | NV | NV | NV | NV | NV | NV | NV | NV | NV | NV | NV | NV | NV | NV | NV | NV | NV |

== Head coaches ==
=== Coaches ===
Note: Stats shown are before the beginning of the season. Overall and Pac-12 records are from time at current school.

| Team | Head coach | Previous job | Seasons at school | Overall record | Pac-12 record | Pac-12 titles | NCAA tournaments | NCAA Final Fours | NCAA Championships |
|---|---|---|---|---|---|---|---|---|---|
| Arizona | Sean Miller | Xavier | 10th | 247–73 (.772) | 121–40 (.752) | 5 | 10 | 0 | 0 |
| Arizona State | Bobby Hurley | Buffalo | 4th | 50–47 (.515) | 20–34 (.370) | 0 | 0 | 0 | 0 |
| California | Wyking Jones | California (assistant) | 2nd | 8–24 (.250) | 2–16 (.111) | 0 | 0 | 0 | 0 |
| Colorado | Tad Boyle | Northern Colorado | 9th | 166–110 (.601) | 72-70 (.507) | 0 | 3 | 0 | 0 |
| Oregon | Dana Altman | Creighton | 9th | 209–83 (.716) | 94–49 (.657) | 2 | 5 | 0 | 0 |
| Oregon State | Wayne Tinkle | Montana | 5th | 57–70 (.449) | 25–47 (.347) | 0 | 4 | 0 | 0 |
| Stanford | Jerod Haase | UAB | 3rd | 33–33 (.500) | 17–19 (.472) | 0 | 0 | 0 | 0 |
| UCLA | Murry Bartow interim | UCLA (assistant) | 1st | 0–0 (–) | 0–0 (–) | 0 | 0 | 0 | 0 |
| USC | Andy Enfield | Florida Gulf Coast | 6th | 94–76 (.553) | 36–54 (.400) | 0 | 2 | 0 | 0 |
| Utah | Larry Krystkowiak | New Jersey Nets (assistant) | 8th | 137–97 (.585) | 63–61 (.508) | 0 | 4 | 0 | 0 |
| Washington | Mike Hopkins | Syracuse (assistant) | 2nd | 21–13 (.618) | 10–8 (.556) | 0 | 0 | 0 | 0 |
| Washington State | Ernie Kent | Oregon | 5th | 47–77 (.379) | 18–54 (.250) | 0 | 6 | 0 | 0 |

Notes:

- Overall and Pac-12 records, conference titles, etc. are from time at current school and are through the end the 2018–19 season.
- NCAA tournament appearances are from time at current school only.
- NCAA Final Fours and Championship include time at other schools
- Steve Allford fired from UCLA on 12/31/18 with a 7-6 record

== Postseason ==
=== Pac-12 tournament ===
Oregon won the conference tournament held March 13–16, 2019, at the T-Mobile Arena, Paradise, NV. The top four teams had a bye on the first day. Teams were seeded by conference record, with ties broken by record between the tied teams followed by record against the regular-season champion, if necessary.

First round Wednesday, March 13
8 | USC | 78
9 | Arizona | 65
5 | Colorado | 56
12 | California | 51
7 | UCLA | 79
10 | Stanford | 72
6 | Oregon | 84
11 | Washington State | 51

Quarterfinals; Thursday, March 14
1 | Washington | 78
8 | USC | 75
4 | Oregon State | 58
5 | Colorado | 73
2 | Arizona State | 83
7 | UCLA | 72
3 | Utah | 54
6 | Oregon | 66

Semifinals; Friday, March 15
1 | Washington | 66
5 | Colorado | 61
2 | Arizona State | 75
6 | Oregon | 79*

Championship; Saturday, March 16
1 | Washington | 48
6 | Oregon | 68

* denotes overtime period

=== NCAA tournament ===
Three teams from the conference were selected to participate: Oregon, Washington and Arizona State.

| Seed | Region | School | First Four | First round | Second round | Sweet Sixteen | Elite Eight | Final Four | Championship |
|---|---|---|---|---|---|---|---|---|---|
| No. 9 | Midwest | Washington | N/A | defeated No. 8 Utah State 78−61 | lost to No. 1 UNC 59−81 | – | – | – | – |
| No. 11 | West | Arizona State | defeated No. 11 St. John's 74−65 | lost to No. 6 Buffalo 74−91 | – | – | – | – | – |
| No. 12 | South | Oregon | N/A | defeated vs No. 5 Wisconsin 72−54 | defeated No. 13 UC Irvine 73−54 | lost to No. 1 Virginia 49−53 | – | – | – |
| | 3 Bids | W-L (%): | 1–0 (1.000) | 2–1 (.667) | 1–1 (.500) | 0–1 (.000) | 0–0 (–) | 0–0 (–) | TOTAL: 4–3 (.571) |

=== National Invitation Tournament ===
One team from the conference were selected to participate: Colorado.

| Seed | Bracket | School | First round | Second round | Quarterfinals | Semifinals | Finals |
|---|---|---|---|---|---|---|---|
| 4 | Alabama | Colorado | defeated No. 5 Dayton 78–73 | defeated No. 8 Norfolk State 76–60 | lost to No. 2 Texas 55–68 | − | − |
| | 1 Bid | W-L (%): | 1–0 (1.000) | 1–0 (1.000) | 0–1 (.000) | 0–0 (–) | TOTAL: 2–1 (.667) |

Index to colors and formatting
Pac-12 member won
Pac-12 member lost

== Awards and honors ==
=== Players of the Week ===
Throughout the conference regular season, the Pac-12 offices named one or two players of the week each Monday.

| Week | Player of the Week | School | Ref. |
|---|---|---|---|
| Nov. 12 | KZ Okpala | Stanford | |
| Nov. 19 | Jaylen Nowell | Washington | |
| Nov. 26 | Luguentz Dort | Arizona State | |
| Dec. 3 | Zylan Cheatham | Arizona State | |
| Dec. 10 | Jaylen Nowell (2) | Washington | |
| Dec. 17 | Remy Martin | Arizona State | |
| Dec. 24 | Rob Edwards | Arizona State | |
| Dec. 31 | Josh Sharma | Stanford | |
| Jan. 7 | Nick Rakocevic | USC | |
| Jan. 14 | Stephen Thompson Jr. | Oregon State | |
| Jan. 21 | Nick Rakocevic | USC | |
| Jan. 28 | Jaylen Nowell (3) | Washington | |
| Feb. 4 | Tres Tinkle | Oregon State | |
| Feb. 11 | Robert Franks | Washington State | |
| Feb. 18 | Josh Sharma (2) | Stanford | |
| Feb. 25 | Matisse Thybulle | Washington | |
| Mar. 4 | Jaylen Hands | UCLA | |
| Mar. 11 | Tyler Bey | Colorado | |

==== Totals per School ====
| School | Total |
|---|---|
| Arizona State | 4 |
| Washington | 4 |
| Stanford | 3 |
| Oregon State | 2 |
| USC | 2 |
| Colorado | 1 |
| UCLA | 1 |
| Washington State | 1 |

=== Conference awards ===
Voting was by conference coaches.

==== Individual awards ====
Pac-12 individual awards
| Award | Recipient(s) |
|---|---|
| Player of The Year | Jaylen Nowell, So., Washington |
| Coach of the Year | Mike Hopkins, Washington |
| Defensive Player of The Year | Matisse Thybulle, Sr., Washington |
| Freshman of The Year | Luguentz Dort, Arizona State |
| Scholar-Athlete of the Year | Stephen Thompson Jr., Sr., Oregon State |
| Most Improved Player of The Year | Tyler Bey, So., Colorado |
| Sixth Man of The Year | Donnie Tillman, So., Utah |

==== All-Pac-12 ====
First Team

| Name | School | Pos. | Yr. | Ht., Wt. | Hometown (Last School) |
|---|---|---|---|---|---|
| Sedrick Barefield | Utah | G | Sr. | 7-2, 1+0 | Corona, Calif. (Centennial High School) |
| Tyler Bey | Colorado | G/F | So. | 6-7, 206 | Las Vegas, Nev. (Middlebrooks Academy) |
| Bennie Boatwright | USC | F | Sr. | 6-10, 235 | Mission Hills, Calif. (Village Christian) |
| Zylan Cheatham | Arizona State | F | R-Sr. | 6-8, 220 | Phoenix, Ariz. (South Mountain) |
| Robert Franks | Washington State | F | Sr. | 6-7, 240 | Vancouver, Wash. ( Evergreen High School) |
| Jaylen Nowell‡ | Washington | G | So. | 6-4, 200 | Seattle, Wash. (Garfield) |
| KZ Okpala | Stanford | F | So. | 6-8, 195 | Orange County, Calif. ( Esperanza HS) |
| Matisse Thybulle | Washington | G | Sr. | 6-5, 195 | Issaquah, Wash. (Eastside Catholic) |
| Tres Tinkle†† | Oregon State | F | R-Jr. | 6-8, 220 | Missoula, Mont. (Hellgate HS) |
| McKinley Wright IV | Colorado | G | So. | 6-0, 195 | North Robbinsdale, Minn. (Champlin Park) |

- ‡ Pac-12 Player of the Year
- †† two-time All-Pac-12 First Team honoree
- † two-time All-Pac-12 honoree

Second Team

| Name | School | Pos. | Yr. | Ht., Wt. |
|---|---|---|---|---|
| Luguentz Dort | Arizona State | G | Fr. | 6-4, 215 |
| Jaylen Hands | UCLA | G | So. | 6-3, 180 |
| Remy Martin | Arizona State | G | So. | 6-0, 170 |
| Stephen Thompson Jr. | Oregon State | G | Sr. | 6-4, 170 |
| Kris Wilkes | UCLA | G | So. | 6-8, 195 |

Honorable Mention

- Noah Dickerson (WASH, F), Louis King (ORE, F), Nick Rakocevic (USC, F), Josh Sharma (STAN, F).

==== All-Freshman Team ====
| Name | School | Pos. | Ht., Wt. |
|---|---|---|---|
| Timmy Allen | Utah | F | 6-6, 210 |
| Moses Brown | UCLA | C | 7-1, 245 |
| Luguentz Dort‡ | Arizona State | G | 6-4, 215 |
| C. J. Elleby | Washington State | F | 6-6, 200 |
| Louis King | Oregon | F | 6-9, 205 |

‡ Pac-12 Freshman of the Year

Honorable Mention

- Brandon Williams (ARIZ, G)

==== All-Defensive Team ====
| Name | School | Pos. | Yr. | Ht., Wt. |
|---|---|---|---|---|
| Zylan Cheatham | Arizona State | F | R-Sr. | 6-8, 220 |
| Luguentz Dort | Arizona State | F | Fr. | 5-4, 215 |
| Kylor Kelley | Oregon State | F | Jr. | 7-0, 215 |
| Matisse Thybulle‡ | Washington | F | Sr. | 6-5, 195 |
| Kenny Wooten | Oregon | F | So. | 6-9, 220 |

‡Pac-12 Defensive Player of the Year

Honorable Mention

- Moses Brown (UCLA, C), McKinley Wright IV (COLO, G).

==== All-Academic team ====
First Team

| Name | School | Pos. | Ht., Wt. | GPA | Major |
|---|---|---|---|---|---|
| Chase Jeter | Arizona | F | 6-10, 230 | 3.54 | General studies |
| Gligorije Rakocevic††† | Oregon State | F | 6-11, 250 | 3.66 | Digital communication arts |
| Jeff Pollard†† | Washington State | F | 6-9, 240 | 3.73 | Business (management) |
| Zach Reichle | Oregon State | G | 6-5, 195 | 3.78 | Business information systems |
| Stephen Thompson Jr.‡††† | Oregon State | G | 6-4, 190 | 3.57 | Interdisciplinary studies (master's) |
| Isaac White | Stanford | G | 6-1, 185 | 3.71 | Undeclared |

- ‡ indicates player was Pac-12 Scholar-Athlete of the Year
- †† two-time Pac-12 All-Academic honoree
- ††† three-time Pac-12 All-Academic honoree

Second Team

| Name | School | Pos. | Ht., Wt. | GPA | Major |
|---|---|---|---|---|---|
| Jayce Johnson | Utah | C | 7-0, 235 | 3.53 | Psychology |
| Kodye Pugh | Stanford | F | 6-8, 205 | 3.33 | Film and media studies |
| D'Shawn Schwartz | Colorado | F | 6-7, 223 | 3.28 | Business |
| Trevor Stanback | Stanford | G | 6-11, 220 | 3.35 | Psychology |
| Ethan Thompson | Oregon State | G | 6-5, 190 | 3.55 | Digital media communications |

Honorable Mention

- Evan Battey (COLO), Oscar da Silva (STAN), De’Quon Lake (ASU), Alexander Strating (COLO), Justice Sueing (CAL), Tres Tinkle (OSU), Parker Van Dyke (UTAH)

== 2019 NBA draft ==
| Round | Pick | Player | Position | Nationality | Team | School/club team |
|---|---|---|---|---|---|---|
| 1 | 20 | Matisse Thybulle | SG | United States | Boston Celtics | Washington(Sr.) |
| 1 | 30 | Kevin Porter | SG | United States | Cleveland Cavaliers | USC (Fr.) |
| 2 | 32 | KZ Okpala | SF | United States | Phoenix Suns | Stanford (So.) |
| 2 | 43 | Jaylen Nowell | SG | United States | Minnesota Timberwolves | Washington (Sr.) |
| 2 | 46 | Bol Bol | C | Sudan | Miami Heat | Oregon (Fr.) |
| 2 | 56 | Jaylen Hands | PG | United States | Los Angeles Clippers | UCLA (So.) |

== Home game attendance ==
| Team | Stadium | Capacity | Game 1 | Game 2 | Game 3 | Game 4 | Game 5 | Game 6 | Game 7 | Game 8 | Game 9 | Game 10 | Game 11 | Game 12 | Game 13 | Game 14 | Game 15 | Game 16 | Game 17 | Game 18 | Total | Average | % of Capacity |
|---|---|---|---|---|---|---|---|---|---|---|---|---|---|---|---|---|---|---|---|---|---|---|---|
| Arizona | McKale Center | 14,644 | 13,749 | 13,995 | 13,651 | 13,486 | 13,724 | 13,058 | 12,925 | 13,576 | 13,511 | 13,764 | 14,032 | 14,410† | 13,732 | 14,145 | 13,737 | 13,859 | 14,291 | | 233,645 | 13,744 | 93.85% |
| Arizona State | Wells Fargo Arena | 14,100 | 9,145 | 8,515 | 8,818 | 6,951 | 10,085 | 14,592 | 10,030 | 9,128 | 10,003 | 9,705 | 12,751 | **14,731†** | 9,517 | 12,686 | 10,327 | 11,618 | | | 168,602 | 10,538 | 74.73% |
| California | Haas Pavilion | 11,858 | 3,312 | 4,116 | 4,039 | 5,268 | 3,907 | 3,443 | 4,104 | 5,827 | 7,868† | 5,720 | 6,218 | 7,840 | 7,182 | 7,345 | 6,441 | 7,406 | | | 90,036 | 5,627 | 47.46% |
| Colorado | Coors Events Center | 11,064 | 5,695 | 5,720 | 5,550 | 7,887 | 6,462 | 7,277 | 6,184 | 7,758 | 6,839 | 8,654† | 6,273 | 7,899 | 8,405 | 7,797 | 9,379 | | | | 107,779 | 7,185 | 64.94% |
| Oregon | Matthew Knight Arena | 12,364 | 8,212 | 8,009 | 7,757 | 6,926 | 8,052 | 7,191 | 8,506 | 6,909 | 11,204 | 10,105 | 8,148 | 9,464 | 8,929 | 8,768 | 9,014 | 7,682 | 11,339† | | 146,215 | 8,601 | 69.56% |
| Oregon State | Gill Coliseum | 9,604 | 3,590 | 3,931 | 4,369 | 5,802 | 3,534 | 4,587 | 4,210 | 4,935 | 5,853 | 5,100 | 6,462 | 4,293 | 5,122 | 9,301† | 5,468 | 6,023 | | | 82,580 | 5,164 | 53.74% |
| Stanford | Maples Pavilion | 7,233 | 3,365 | 3,240 | 3,663 | 2,821 | 3,452 | 3,909 | 3,969 | 3,279 | 3,648 | 5,052 | 5,418 | 3,139 | 5,741† | 3,822 | | | | | 54,518 | 3,894 | 53.84% |
| UCLA | Pauley Pavilion | 13,800 | 5,931 | 7,920 | 6,127 | 6,076 | 6,062 | 8,242 | 12,985† | 8,037 | 7,456 | 8,026 | 9,045 | 7,555 | 11,164 | 6,983 | 7,268 | 6,944 | 10,588 | 12,427 | 148,836 | 8,269 | 59.92% |
| USC | Galen Center | 10,258 | 2,502 | 3,804 | 1,533 | 2,348 | 2,031 | 3,125 | 3,127 | 3,371 | 3,768 | 5,226† | 4,125 | 5,111 | 2,952 | 3,974 | 3,425 | 4,772 | | | 55,194 | 3,450 | 33.63% |
| Utah | Jon M. Huntsman Center | 15,000 | 10,971 | 10,804 | 10,775 | 10,887 | 11,239 | 12,835 | 10,481 | 11,358 | 10,372 | 11,301 | 11,884 | 11,478 | 12,585 | 11,007 | 12,914† | | | | 170,897 | 11,393 | 77.03% |
| Washington | Alaska Airlines Arena | 10,000 | 5,721 | 6,219 | 6,054 | 6,533 | 6,688 | 6,888 | 5,083 | 8,028 | 7,852 | 9,225 | 9,121 | **10,000†** | 8,268 | **10,000†** | 9,863 | **10,000†** | | | 125,534 | 7,846 | 78.46% |
| Washington State | Beasley Coliseum | 11,671 | 2,090 | 1,774 | 1,203 | 1,909 | 2,748 | 1,673 | 1,776 | 2,723 | 2,130 | 2,364 | 2,497 | 2,559 | 4,233† | 1,911 | 3,199 | 2,065 | 2,549 | | 39,403 | 2,318 | 19.86% |
| Total | | 11,800 | | | | | | | | | | | | | | | | | | | 1,423,242 | 7,374 | 62.49% |

Bold – At or Exceed capacity
†Season High
