= Matt Bradley (basketball) =

American basketball player (born 1999)

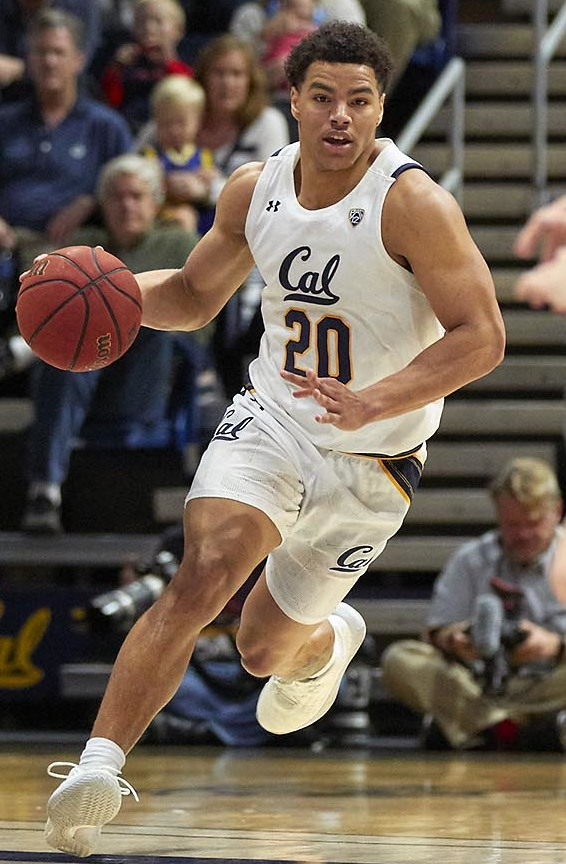
- Bradley with California in 2020

Free agent
- Position: Shooting guard

Personal information
- Born: August 19, 1999 (age 27) San Bernardino, California, U.S.
- Listed height: 6 ft 4 in (1.93 m)
- Listed weight: 220 lb (100 kg)

Career information
- High school: Rancho Cucamonga (Rancho Cucamonga, California); San Bernardino (San Bernardino, California); Wasatch Academy (Mount Pleasant, Utah)
- College: California (2018–2021); San Diego State (2021–2023)
- NBA draft: 2023: undrafted
- Playing career: 2023–present

Career history
- 2023–2024: Rostock Seawolves

Career highlights
- 2× First-team All-Mountain West (2022, 2023); 2× Second-team All-Pac-12 (2020, 2021)
- Stats at Basketball Reference

Matthew Bradley (born August 19, 1999) is an American professional basketball player who last played for the Rostock Seawolves of the Basketball Bundesliga. He played three seasons for the California Golden Bears, earning second-team all-conference honors twice in the Pac-12. He transferred to the San Diego State Aztecs in 2021, and has twice been named first-team All-MWC.

== High school career ==
As a freshman, Bradley played varsity basketball for Rancho Cucamonga High School in Rancho Cucamonga, California but missed most of the season with a broken foot. For his sophomore season, he transferred to San Bernardino High School in San Bernardino, California, which was closer to home, and sat out one month due to transfer rules. Early in his junior season, Bradley posted three straight 40-point games at the BattleZone Tournament. On January 12, 2017, he scored a school-record 72 points and grabbed 15 rebounds in an 88–55 win over Rubidoux High School. As a junior, Bradley averaged 31 points, 11 rebounds, five assists and four steals per game and was named California Interscholastic Federation Division IV Player of the Year. For his senior season, he moved to Wasatch Academy in Mount Pleasant, Utah to compete at the national level against better competition. Bradley helped his team achieve a 24–2 record and a number 13 national ranking. He played in the Ballislife All-American Game in May 2018.

=== Recruiting ===
Bradley was a consensus four-star recruit, with Rivals.com considering him the 53rd-best player in the 2018 class. On June 1, 2017, after his junior season, he committed to play college basketball for California over offers from San Diego State, Utah and Utah State, among others. Bradley was drawn to the program by head coach Wyking Jones.

College recruiting
Name	Hometown	School	Height	Weight	Commit date
Matt Bradley; SG	San Bernardino, CA	Wasatch Academy (UT)	6 ft 4 in (1.93 m)	210 lb (95 kg)	Jun 1, 2017
Matt Bradley; SG	Recruit ratings: Rivals: 247Sports: ESPN: (81)				
Overall recruit ranking: Rivals: 55 247Sports: 85 ESPN: —
Note: In many cases, Scout, Rivals, 247Sports, On3, and ESPN may conflict in their listings of height and weight.; In these cases, the average was taken. ESPN grades are on a 100-point scale.; Sources: "California 2018 Basketball Commitments". Rivals.; "2018 California Golden Bears Recruiting Class". ESPN.; "2018 Team Ranking". Rivals.

== College career ==
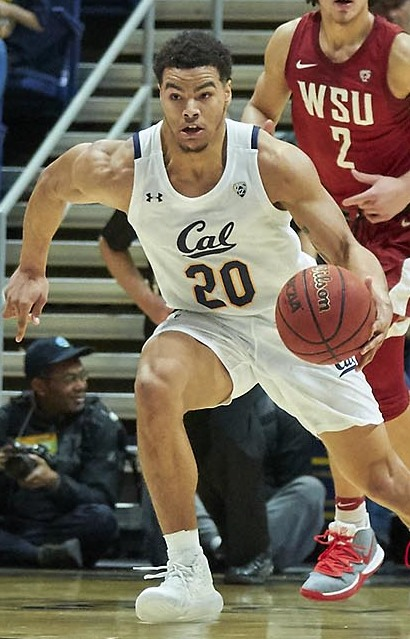
Bradley with California in 2020

On November 9, 2018, Bradley made his debut for California, scoring 13 points in a 76–59 loss to Yale. On February 24, 2019, he recorded his first double-double with a freshman season-high 23 points, making five three-pointers, and 10 rebounds in a 69–59 loss to Arizona State. As a freshman, Bradley averaged 10.9 points, 3.6 rebounds and two assists per game. He shot 47.2 percent from three-point range, setting a school freshman record. In his sophomore season, Bradley had an expanded role with the departure of leading scorer Justice Sueing. On January 9, 2020, Bradley posted 26 points, 10 rebounds and four assists in a 73–66 victory over Washington State. In his next game, he made a game-winning three-pointer with six seconds left in overtime against Washington, 61–58. As a sophomore, he averaged 17.5 points, 4.9 rebounds and 1.5 assists per game and was named second-team All-Pac-12. In his junior season, he averaged 17.9 points, 4.6 rebounds and 1.7 assists per game and repeated as a second-team all-conference selection.

On April 12, 2021, Bradley announced that he would transfer to the San Diego State Aztecs program. He was close with former Aztec Matt Mitchell, his former Amateur Athletic Union teammate. Bradley was also a family friend of former Aztec standout Michael Cage. In his first season at San Diego State University, Bradley was named first-team All-Mountain West in 2021–22. He averaged 16.9 points and 5.4 rebounds per game. He opted to return for his fifth season of eligibility, in order to complete his degree in criminal justice. On December 31, 2022, Bradley scored 23 points in a 76-67 victory at UNLV and surpassed the 2,000 point threshold.

In his final season with the SDSU Aztecs, Bradley was instrumental in leading his team all the way to the championship final of the 2023 NCAA March Madness Tournament, knocking off numerous higher-seeded teams and losing to the Uconn Huskies in the final.

== Professional career ==
After going undrafted in the 2023 NBA draft, Bradley signed his first professional contract with the Rostock Seawolves of the Basketball Bundesliga on August 17, 2023.

On October 18, 2024, Bradley signed with the Houston Rockets, but was waived the next day. On October 27, he joined the Rio Grande Valley Vipers and on November 7, he was waived by the Vipers.

== Career statistics ==
Legend
GP	Games played	GS	Games started	MPG	Minutes per game
FG%	Field goal percentage	3P%	3-point field goal percentage	FT%	Free throw percentage
RPG	Rebounds per game	APG	Assists per game	SPG	Steals per game
BPG	Blocks per game	PPG	Points per game	**Bold**	Career high

=== College ===
Year	Team	GP	GS	MPG	FG%	3P%	FT%	RPG	APG	SPG	BPG	PPG
2018–19	California	31	19	28.4	.411	**.472**	.791	3.6	2.0	0.9	**0.4**	10.8
2019–20	California	32	30	**33.2**	.437	.384	**.868**	4.9	1.5	0.5	0.2	17.5
2020–21	California	22	19	30.2	**.455**	.364	.821	4.6	1.7	0.4	0.2	**18.0**
2021–22	San Diego State	32	32	31.5	.438	.401	.779	**5.4**	**2.7**	**1.0**	0.2	16.9
2022–23	San Diego State	**39**	**39**	26.4	.398	.356	.800	3.8	2.1	0.7	0.3	12.6
Career		156	139	29.8	.427	.391	.814	4.5	2.0	0.7	0.3	14.9
