= Jaylen Nowell =

American basketball player (born 1999)

- Nowell with the Beşiktaş in 2026

No. 24 – Beşiktaş Fuzul
- Position: Point guard / shooting guard
- League: BSL; EuroLeague

Personal information
- Born: July 9, 1999 (age 27) Seattle, Washington, U.S.
- Listed height: 6 ft 4 in (1.93 m)
- Listed weight: 201 lb (91 kg)

Career information
- High school: Garfield (Seattle, Washington)
- College: Washington (2017–2019)
- NBA draft: 2019: 2nd round, 43rd overall pick
- Drafted by: Minnesota Timberwolves
- Playing career: 2019–present

Career history
- 2019–2023: Minnesota Timberwolves
- 2019–2020: →Iowa Wolves
- 2023: Memphis Grizzlies
- 2023–2024: Stockton Kings
- 2024: Detroit Pistons
- 2024: New Orleans Pelicans
- 2024–2025: Capital City Go-Go
- 2025–2026: Shanxi Loongs
- 2026: Gigantes de Carolina
- 2026–present: Beşiktaş

Career highlights
- All-NBA G League First Team (2025); BSN scoring champion (2026); Pac-12 Player of the Year (2019); First-team All-Pac-12 (2019)
- Stats at NBA.com
- Stats at Basketball Reference

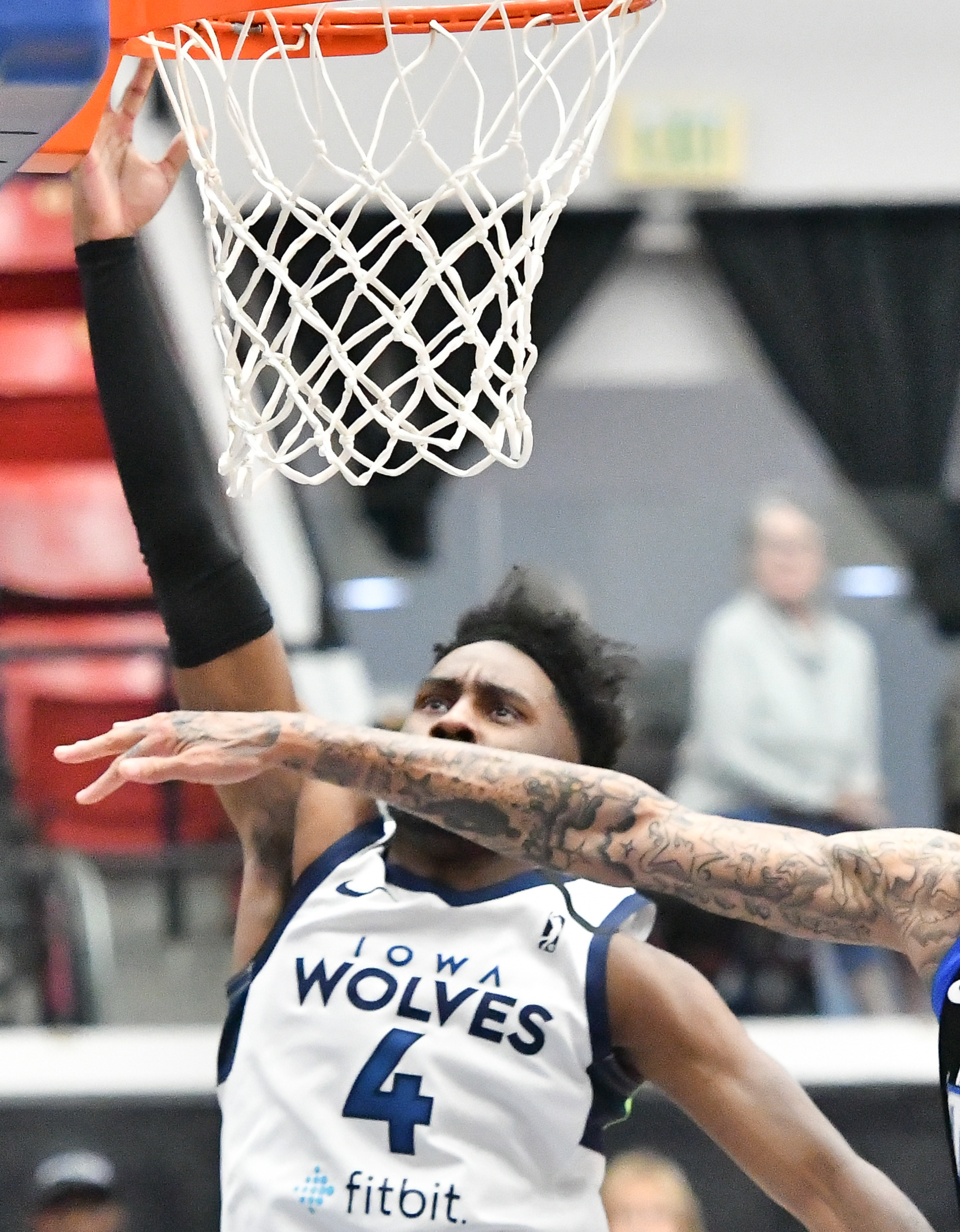
Nowell with the Iowa Wolves in 2020

Jaylen Clinton Andrew Nowell (born July 9, 1999) is an American professional basketball player for Beşiktaş of the Basketbol Süper Ligi (BSL) and the EuroLeague. He played college basketball for the Washington Huskies of the Pac-12 Conference, and was named the conference's player of the year in 2019. He was selected by the Minnesota Timberwolves in the second round of the 2019 NBA draft.

== Early life ==
Nowell was born in Seattle to Lanie and Mike Nowell. His parents met at Clark Atlanta University, where they both played basketball. His father played professionally in the Continental Basketball Association. Jaylen Nowell attended high school in Seattle at Garfield High, where he was a standout player.

== College career ==
At the University of Washington, Nowell was originally part of a five-player recruiting class considered the best in the Huskies' history. However, after Washington coach Lorenzo Romar was fired, he was the lone member who remained committed to the school and first-year coach Mike Hopkins. As a freshman in 2017–18, Nowell averaged 16.0 points per game. The following season, he was named the Pac-12 Player of the Year after leading the Huskies in scoring and helping them win the Pac-12 regular season championship.

Following Washington's loss in the 2019 NCAA men's basketball tournament, Nowell announced his intention to forgo his final two seasons of collegiate eligibility and declare for the 2019 NBA draft.

== Professional career ==
=== Minnesota Timberwolves (2019–2023) ===
On June 20, 2019, Nowell was selected with the 43rd overall pick in the 2nd round by the Minnesota Timberwolves in the 2019 NBA draft. He was later included in the Timberwolves' roster for the 2019 NBA Summer League. On August 6, Nowell signed with the Timberwolves. He made his NBA debut on November 6, playing one minute in a 121–137 loss to the Memphis Grizzlies. On January 1, 2020, Nowell scored a season-high 12 points, alongside two rebounds, in a 104–106 loss to the Milwaukee Bucks.

On March 11, 2021, Nowell scored a season-high 28 points, alongside five rebounds and six assists, in a 135–105 win over the New Orleans Pelicans.

On December 27, 2021, Nowell scored a career-high 29 points, alongside six rebounds and three assists, in a 108–103 win over the Boston Celtics. The Timberwolves qualified for the postseason for the first time since 2018 and faced the Memphis Grizzlies during their first round series. Nowell made his playoff debut on April 19, 2022, scoring six points in a 96–124 Game 2 loss. The Timberwolves were eliminated by the Grizzlies in six games.

=== Stockton Kings / Memphis Grizzlies (2023–2024) ===
On October 2, 2023, Nowell signed with the Sacramento Kings, but was waived on October 20. On November 9, he was named to the opening night roster for the Stockton Kings.

On November 24, 2023, Nowell signed a 10-day contract with the Grizzlies and on December 4, he signed a second 10-day deal. On December 15, he returned to Stockton.

=== Detroit Pistons (2024) ===
On April 3, 2024, Nowell signed a 10-day contract with the Detroit Pistons and on April 13, he signed a second 10-day contract.

On September 29, 2024, Nowell signed with the Washington Wizards, but was waived on October 10. On October 28, he joined the Capital City Go-Go

=== New Orleans Pelicans (2024) ===
On November 3, 2025, Nowell signed with the New Orleans Pelicans. However, he was waived on November 20.

=== Capital City Go-Go (2024–2025) ===
On November 20, 2024, Nowell signed with the Capital City Go-Go for a second time. On February 8, 2025, Nowell signed a 10-day contract with the Washington Wizards, but did not appear in a game for them. Following the expiration of his 10-day contract, he returned to the Go-Go.

=== Shanxi Loongs (2025–2026) ===
On June 9, 2025, Nowell signed with the Shanxi Loongs of the Chinese Basketball Association (CBA).

=== Beşiktaş (2026–present) ===
On July 12, 2026, Nowell signed with Beşiktaş of the Turkish Basketbol Süper Ligi (BSL).

== Career statistics ==
Legend
| GP | Games played | GS | Games started | MPG | Minutes per game |
| FG% | Field goal percentage | 3P% | 3-point field goal percentage | FT% | Free throw percentage |
| RPG | Rebounds per game | APG | Assists per game | SPG | Steals per game |
| BPG | Blocks per game | PPG | Points per game | **Bold** | Career high |

=== NBA ===
==== Regular season ====
| Year | Team | GP | GS | MPG | FG% | 3P% | FT% | RPG | APG | SPG | BPG | PPG |
|---|---|---|---|---|---|---|---|---|---|---|---|---|
| 2019–20 | Minnesota | 15 | 0 | 10.1 | .358 | .115 | .941 | .9 | 1.3 | .2 | .1 | 3.8 |
| 2020–21 | Minnesota | 42 | 0 | 18.1 | .424 | .333 | .818 | 2.3 | 1.5 | .5 | .3 | 9.0 |
| 2021–22 | Minnesota | 62 | 1 | 15.7 | .475 | **.394** | .783 | 2.0 | 2.1 | .4 | .2 | 8.5 |
| 2022–23 | Minnesota | **65** | **2** | 19.3 | .448 | .289 | .778 | **2.6** | 2.0 | **.6** | .1 | **10.8** |
| 2023–24 | Memphis | 9 | 1 | 17.4 | .400 | .174 | **1.000** | 1.6 | 1.8 | .3 | .0 | 5.7 |
| 2023–24 | Detroit | 4 | 0 | 14.4 | **.522** | .333 | .667 | 2.5 | .8 | .3 | **.5** | 7.5 |
| 2024–25 | New Orleans | 8 | 0 | **21.0** | .356 | .296 | .636 | 2.5 | **2.3** | .1 | **.5** | 8.4 |
| Career | | 205 | 4 | 17.2 | .442 | .316 | .792 | 2.2 | 1.9 | .5 | .2 | 8.9 |

==== Playoffs ====
| Year | Team | GP | GS | MPG | FG% | 3P% | FT% | RPG | APG | SPG | BPG | PPG |
|---|---|---|---|---|---|---|---|---|---|---|---|---|
| 2022 | Minnesota | 1 | 0 | 11.9 | **.300** | .000 | — | .0 | **1.0** | **1.0** | .0 | **6.0** |
| 2023 | Minnesota | **5** | 0 | **12.4** | .231 | **.333** | .500 | **1.0** | .6 | .0 | .0 | 3.2 |
| Career | | 6 | 0 | 12.3 | .250 | .214 | .500 | .8 | .7 | .2 | .0 | 3.7 |

=== College ===
| Year | Team | GP | GS | MPG | FG% | 3P% | FT% | RPG | APG | SPG | BPG | PPG |
|---|---|---|---|---|---|---|---|---|---|---|---|---|
| 2017–18 | Washington | 34 | 31 | 32.5 | .451 | .351 | **.800** | 4.0 | 2.7 | 1.1 | **.3** | 16.0 |
| 2018–19 | Washington | **36** | **36** | **34.4** | **.502** | **.440** | .779 | **5.3** | **3.1** | **1.3** | **.3** | **16.2** |
| Career | | 70 | 67 | 33.5 | .476 | .396 | .789 | 4.6 | 2.9 | 1.2 | .3 | 16.1 |
