= 2018–19 Washington Huskies men's basketball team =

American college basketball season

2018–19 Washington Huskies men's basketball

Pac-12 regular season champions

NCAA tournament, Second Round
- Conference: Pac-12 Conference
- Record: 27–9 (15–3 Pac-12)
- Head coach: Mike Hopkins (2nd season)
- Assistant coaches: Will Conroy (4th season); Cameron Dollar (2nd season); Dave Rice (2nd season)
- Captains: Matisse Thybulle; David Crisp
- Home arena: Alaska Airlines Arena

2018–19 Pac-12 Conference men's basketball standings
	Conf.				Overall
Team	W		L	PCT	W		L	PCT
Washington	15	–	3	.833	27	–	9	.750
Arizona State	12	–	6	.667	23	–	11	.676
Utah	11	–	7	.611	17	–	14	.548
Oregon State	10	–	8	.556	18	–	13	.581
Colorado	10	–	8	.556	23	–	13	.639
Oregon †	10	–	8	.556	25	–	13	.658
UCLA	9	–	9	.500	17	–	16	.515
USC	8	–	10	.444	16	–	17	.485
Arizona	8	–	10	.444	17	–	15	.531
Stanford	8	–	10	.444	15	–	16	.484
Washington State	4	–	14	.222	11	–	21	.344
California	3	–	15	.167	8	–	23	.258
† Pac-12 Conference tournament winner

The 2018–19 Washington Huskies men's basketball team represented the University of Washington in the 2018–19 NCAA Division I men's basketball season. The Huskies, led by second-year head coach Mike Hopkins, played their home games at Alaska Airlines Arena at Hec Edmundson Pavilion in Seattle, Washington as members of the Pac-12 Conference. They finished the season 27–9, 15–3 in Pac-12 play to win the regular season championship. They advanced to the championship game of the Pac-12 tournament, where they lost to Oregon. They received an at-large bid to the NCAA tournament, where, as a No. 9 seed, they defeated No. 8 seed Utah State in the first round before losing to No. 1 seed North Carolina in the second round.

== Previous season ==
The Huskies finished the 2017–18 season 21–13, 10–8 in Pac-12 play to finish in a tie for sixth place. They lost to Oregon State in the first round of the Pac-12 tournament. They received an invitation to the National Invitation Tournament, where they defeated Boise State in the first round before losing to Saint Mary's in the second round.

== Off-season ==
=== Departures ===
Name	Number	Pos.	Height	Weight	Year	Hometown	Reason for departure
Bitumba Baruti	0	G	6'6"	210	Junior	DR Congo	Transferred to Chipola College
Dan Kingma	2	G	5'10"	160	Senior	Mill Creek, WA	Graduated
Michael Carter III	14	G	6'4"	190	Freshman	Seattle, WA	Transferred to South Dakota State
Carlos Johnson	23	G	6'4"	215	Sophomore	Centralia, IL	Transferred to Grand Canyon University
Devenir Duruisseau	24	F	6'8"	245	Junior	Palmdale, CA	Left team
Greg Bowman	32	F	6'7"	225	Senior	Mountlake Terrace, WA	Graduated

=== Incoming transfers ===
Name	Number	Pos.	Height	Weight	Year	Hometown	Previous school
Travis Rice	30	G	6'2"	170	RS sophomore	Las Vegas, NV	Northern Arizona
Quade Green		G	6'0"	170	Sophomore	Philadelphia, Pennsylvania	Kentucky

=== 2018 recruiting class ===
College recruiting
Name	Hometown	School	Height	Weight	Commit date
Elijah Hardy; PG	Oakland, CA	Bishop O'Dowd High School	6 ft 2 in (1.88 m)	160 lb (73 kg)	Sep 9, 2017
Elijah Hardy; PG	Recruit ratings: Scout: Rivals: 247Sports: ESPN:				
Nate Roberts; PF	Edgewood, MD	Brewster Academy	6 ft 11.5 in (2.12 m)	220 lb (100 kg)	Oct 17, 2017
Nate Roberts; PF	Recruit ratings: Scout: Rivals: 247Sports: ESPN:				
Jamal Bey; SF	Las Vegas, NV	Bishop Gorman High School	6 ft 6 in (1.98 m)	185 lb (84 kg)	Sep 30, 2017
Jamal Bey; SF	Recruit ratings: Scout: Rivals: 247Sports: ESPN:				
Bryan Penn-Johnson; C	Las Vegas, NV	Wasatch Academy	7 ft 0 in (2.13 m)	215 lb (98 kg)	Mar 19, 2018
Bryan Penn-Johnson; C	Recruit ratings: Scout: Rivals: 247Sports: ESPN:				
Riley Sorn; C	Richland, WA	Richland High	7 ft 4 in (2.24 m)	235 lb (107 kg)	May 21, 2018
Riley Sorn; C	Recruit ratings: 247Sports:				
Overall recruit ranking:
Note: In many cases, Scout, Rivals, 247Sports, On3, and ESPN may conflict in their listings of height and weight.; In these cases, the average was taken. ESPN grades are on a 100-point scale.; Sources: "2018 Washington Signees". Rivals.; "2018 Washington Signees". Scout.; "2018 Washington Signees". ESPN.; "Scout.com Team Recruiting Rankings". Scout.; "2018 Team Ranking". Rivals.

College recruiting (2019)
Name	Hometown	School	Height	Weight	Commit date
RaeQuan Battle; SG	Marysville, WA	Marysville Pilchuck High School	6 ft 5 in (1.96 m)	200 lb (91 kg)	May 31, 2018
RaeQuan Battle; SG	Recruit ratings: Scout: Rivals: 247Sports: ESPN:				
Isaiah Stewart; C	Rochester, NY	La Lumiere School	6 ft 9 in (2.06 m)	245 lb (111 kg)	Jan 20, 2019
Isaiah Stewart; C	Recruit ratings: Scout: Rivals: 247Sports: ESPN:				
Marcus Tsohonis; SG	Portland, OR	Jefferson High School	6 ft 3 in (1.91 m)	170 lb (77 kg)	Sep 18, 2018
Marcus Tsohonis; SG	Recruit ratings: Rivals: 247Sports: ESPN:				
Overall recruit ranking:
Note: In many cases, Scout, Rivals, 247Sports, On3, and ESPN may conflict in their listings of height and weight.; In these cases, the average was taken. ESPN grades are on a 100-point scale.; Sources: "2019 Washington Commits". Rivals.; "ESPN- Washington Huskies Men's Basketball Recruiting". ESPN.; "2019 Team Ranking". Rivals.

== Roster ==
2018–19 Washington Huskies men's basketball team
Players
Coaches

Pos.	#	Name	Height	Weight	Year	Previous school	Hometown
F	0	Jamal Bey	6 ft 6 in (1.98 m)	205 lb (93 kg)	Fr	Bishop Gorman HS	Las Vegas, NV
G	1	David Crisp (C)	6 ft 0 in (1.83 m)	185 lb (84 kg)	Sr	Brewster Academy	Tacoma, WA
G	4	Matisse Thybulle (C)	6 ft 5 in (1.96 m)	205 lb (93 kg)	Sr	Eastside Catholic	Issaquah, WA
G	5	Jaylen Nowell	6 ft 4 in (1.93 m)	200 lb (91 kg)	So	Garfield HS	Seattle, WA
G	10	Elijah Hardy	6 ft 2 in (1.88 m)	175 lb (79 kg)	Fr	Bishop O'Dowd HS	Oakland, CA
F	11	Nahziah Carter	6 ft 6 in (1.98 m)	205 lb (93 kg)	So	Bishop Kearney HS	Rochester, NY
G	12	Jason Crandall (W)	6 ft 0 in (1.83 m)	150 lb (68 kg)	Jr	Issaquah HS	Issaquah, WA
F	13	Hamier Wright	6 ft 9 in (2.06 m)	215 lb (98 kg)	So	Albany Academy	Albany, NY
C	14	Bryan Penn-Johnson	7 ft 0 in (2.13 m)	245 lb (111 kg)	Fr	Wasatch Academy	Long Beach, CA
F	15	Noah Dickerson	6 ft 8 in (2.03 m)	245 lb (111 kg)	Sr	Montverde Academy	Atlanta, GA
G	20	Quin Barnard (W)	6 ft 0 in (1.83 m)	175 lb (79 kg)	Jr	O'Dea HS	Bellevue, WA
G	21	Noah Neubauer (W)	6 ft 2 in (1.88 m)	175 lb (79 kg)	Fr	Garfield HS	Seattle, WA
F	22	Dominic Green	6 ft 6 in (1.98 m)	200 lb (91 kg)	Sr	Hazen HS	Renton, WA
G	23	Jonah Geron (W)	6 ft 5 in (1.96 m)	175 lb (79 kg)	Fr	San Joaquin HS	San Joaquin, CA
F	24	Nate Roberts (redshirt)	6 ft 10 in (2.08 m)	235 lb (107 kg)	Fr	Brewster Academy	Washington, D.C.
G	30	Travis Rice (W)	6 ft 2 in (1.88 m)	185 lb (84 kg)	RS So	Northern Arizona	Las Vegas, NV
F	33	Sam Timmins	6 ft 11 in (2.11 m)	265 lb (120 kg)	Jr	Otago Boys' High School	Dunedin, New Zealand
F	34	Regan Lundeen (W)	6 ft 6 in (1.98 m)	225 lb (102 kg)	Fr	Mater Dei HS	Santa Ana, CA
C	52	Riley Sorn (redshirt)	7 ft 4 in (2.24 m)	260 lb (118 kg)	Fr	Richland HS	Richland, WA
G		Quade Green (redshirt)	6 ft 0 in (1.83 m)	170 lb (77 kg)	So	Kentucky	Philadelphia, PA

Head coach

- Mike Hopkins (Syracuse)

Assistant coach(es)

- Will Conroy (Washington)
- Cameron Dollar (UCLA)
- Dave Rice (UNLV)

Legend

- (C) Team captain
- (S) Suspended
- (I) Ineligible
- (W) Walk-on
- Injured
- Current redshirt

Roster
Last update: January 4, 2019

== Schedule and results ==
Date time, TV	Rank^{#}	Opponent^{#}	Result	Record	High points	High rebounds	High assists	Site (attendance) city, state
Exhibition
October 21, 2018*; 3:00 pm		at Nevada; Wildfire Charity	W 91–73	–	26 – Nowell	6 – Tied	6 – Thybulle	Lawlor Events Center (4,069); Reno, NV
November 1, 2018*; 7:00 pm, P12N	No. 25	Seattle Pacific	W 70–61	–	23 – Nowell	9 – Timmins	3 – Green	Alaska Airlines Arena (5,702); Seattle, WA
Non-conference regular season
November 6, 2018*; 7:30 pm, ESPNU	No. 25	Western Kentucky	W 73–55	1–0	18 – Dickerson	6 – Tied	7 – Crisp	Alaska Airlines Arena (5,721); Seattle, WA
November 9, 2018*; 6:30 pm, SECN	No. 25	at No. 11 Auburn	L 66–88	1–1	16 – Tied	5 – Dickerson	5 – Thybulle	Auburn Arena (9,121); Auburn, AL
November 12, 2018*; 8:00 pm, P12N		San Diego	W 66–63	2–1	18 – Nowell	8 – Dickerson	3 – Nowell	Alaska Airlines Arena (6,219); Seattle, WA
November 18, 2018*; 5:00 pm, ESPN3		vs. Santa Clara; Vancouver Showcase	W 82–68	3–1	32 – Nowell	7 – Carter	7 – Crisp	Vancouver Convention Centre (3,107); Vancouver, BC
November 20, 2018*; 8:30 pm, ESPN2		vs. Texas A&M; Vancouver Showcase	W 71–67	4–1	24 – Dickerson	17 – Dickerson	4 – Crisp	Vancouver Convention Centre (3,070); Vancouver, BC
November 21, 2018*; 3:30 pm, BTN		vs. Minnesota; Vancouver Showcase	L 66–68	4–2	28 – Dickerson	7 – Dickerson	2 – Nowell	Vancouver Convention Centre (1,680); Vancouver, BC
November 27, 2018*; 6:00 pm, P12N		Eastern Washington	W 83–59	5–2	25 – Green	9 – Nowell	7 – Nowell	Alaska Airlines Arena (6,054); Seattle, WA
December 2, 2018*; 5:00 pm, P12N		UC Santa Barbara	W 67–63	6–2	22 – Dickerson	8 – Dickerson	5 – Nowell	Alaska Airlines Arena (6,533); Seattle, WA
December 5, 2018*; 8:00 pm, ESPN2		at No. 1 Gonzaga; Rivalry	L 79–81	6–3	26 – Nowell	7 – Dickerson	6 – Nowell	McCarthey Athletic Center (6,000); Spokane, WA
December 9, 2018*; 6:00 pm, P12N		Seattle	W 70–62	7–3	18 – Nowell	9 – Nowell	3 – Tied	Alaska Airlines Arena (6,688); Seattle, WA
December 15, 2018*; 4:00 pm, ESPNU		vs. No. 13 Virginia Tech; Boardwalk Classic	L 61–73	7–4	16 – Thybulle	9 – Carter	5 – Crisp	Boardwalk Hall (5,456); Atlantic City, NJ
December 21, 2018*; 6:00 pm, P12N		Sacramento State	W 57–41	8–4	12 – Tied	7 – Wright	3 – Crisp	Alaska Airlines Arena (6,888); Seattle, WA
January 1, 2019*; 7:00 pm, P12N		Cal State Fullerton	W 84–76	9–4	20 – Nowell	12 – Dickerson	6 – Nowell	Alaska Airlines Arena (5,083); Seattle, WA
Pac-12 regular season
January 5, 2019; 7:30 pm, P12N		Washington State; Rivalry	W 85–67	10–4 (1–0)	23 – Crisp	8 – Tied	5 – Nowell	Alaska Airlines Arena (8,029); Seattle, WA
January 10, 2019; 7:00 pm, FS1		at Utah	W 69–53	11–4 (2–0)	18 – Carter	12 – Nowell	5 – Nowell	Jon M. Huntsman Center (10,481); Salt Lake City, UT
January 12, 2019; 7:00 pm, ESPNU		at Colorado	W 77–70	12–4 (3–0)	19 – Nowell	8 – Dickerson	5 – Nowell	CU Events Center (7,758); Boulder, CO
January 17, 2019; 6:00 pm, ESPN2		Stanford	W 80–64	13–4 (4–0)	22 – Nowell	5 – Tied	2 – Tied	Alaska Airlines Arena (7,852); Seattle, WA
January 19, 2019; 2:00 pm, P12N		California	W 71–52	14–4 (5–0)	17 – Green	11 – Dickerson	4 – Nowell	Alaska Airlines Arena (9,225); Seattle, WA
January 24, 2019; 6:00 pm, ESPN2		at Oregon	W 61–56	15–4 (6–0)	20 – Nowell	6 – Nowell	7 – Thybulle	Matthew Knight Arena (9,464); Eugene, OR
January 26, 2019; 1:00 pm, P12N		at Oregon State	W 79–69	16–4 (7–0)	19 – Nowell	6 – Tied	4 – Crisp	Gill Coliseum (6,462); Corvallis, OR
January 30, 2019; 8:00 pm, FS1		USC	W 75–62	17–4 (8–0)	21 – Dickerson	14 – Dickerson	7 – Nowell	Alaska Airlines Arena (9,121); Seattle, WA
February 2, 2019; 1:00 pm, ESPN2		UCLA	W 69–55	18–4 (9–0)	15 – Tied	8 – Nowell	4 – Nowell	Alaska Airlines Arena (10,000); Seattle, WA
February 7, 2019; 6:00 pm, ESPN2		at Arizona	W 67–60	19–4 (10–0)	17 – Crisp	6 – Nowell	4 – Nowell	McKale Center (13,732); Tucson, AZ
February 9, 2019; 7:00 pm, ESPN		at Arizona State	L 63–75	19–5 (10–1)	18 – Dickerson	8 – Dickerson	3 – Thybulle	Wells Fargo Arena (12,686); Tempe, AZ
February 16, 2019; 5:00 pm, ESPNU		at Washington State; Rivalry	W 72–70	20–5 (11–1)	20 – Nowell	10 – Dickerson	3 – Thybulle	Beasley Coliseum (4,233); Pullman, WA
February 20, 2019; 8:00 pm, FS1		Utah	W 62–45	21–5 (12–1)	12 – Carter	8 – Nowell	5 – Crisp	Alaska Airlines Arena (8,268); Seattle, WA
February 23, 2019; 7:30 pm, P12N		Colorado	W 64–55	22–5 (13–1)	17 – Thybulle	6 – Green	3 – Tied	Alaska Airlines Arena (10,000); Seattle, WA
February 28, 2019; 7:00 pm, FS1	No. 25	at California	L 73–76	22–6 (13–2)	32 – Crisp	8 – Nowell	7 – Thybulle	Haas Pavilion (6,441); Berkeley, CA
March 3, 2019; 1:00 pm, ESPN2	No. 25	at Stanford	W 62–61	23–6 (14–2)	13 – Nowell	6 – Nowell	2 – Tied	Maples Pavilion (5,741); Stanford, CA
March 6, 2019; 7:00 pm, P12N		Oregon State	W 81–76 ^{OT}	24–6 (15–2)	22 – Tied	17 – Dickerson	5 – Nowell	Alaska Airlines Arena (9,863); Seattle, WA
March 9, 2019; 7:00 pm, ESPN		Oregon	L 47–55	24–7 (15–3)	17 – Nowell	16 – Dickerson	1 – Tied	Alaska Airlines Arena (10,000); Seattle, WA
Pac-12 Tournament
March 14, 2019; 12:00 pm, P12N	(1)	vs. (8) USC; Quarterfinals	W 78–75	25–7	24 – Nowell	11 – Dickerson	6 – Crisp	T-Mobile Arena (10,556); Paradise, NV
March 15, 2019; 6:00 pm, P12N	(1)	vs. (5) Colorado; Semifinals	W 66–61	26–7	14 – Tied	11 – Dickerson	4 – Nowell	T-Mobile Arena (13,955); Paradise, NV
March 16, 2019; 7:30 pm, ESPN	(1)	vs. (6) Oregon; Championship	L 48–68	26–8	8 – Nowell	6 – Dickerson	6 – Crisp	T-Mobile Arena (12,877); Paradise, NV
NCAA tournament
March 22, 2019*; 3:50 pm, TNT	(9 MW)	vs. (8 MW) No. 25 Utah State; First Round	W 78–61	27–8	20 – Dickerson	12 – Dickerson	5 – Nowell	Nationwide Arena (19,426); Columbus, OH
March 24, 2019*; 11:40 am, CBS	(9 MW)	vs. (1 MW) No. 3 North Carolina; Second Round	L 59–81	27–9	12 – Nowell	6 – Dickerson	4 – Thybulle	Nationwide Arena (19,610); Columbus, OH
*Non-conference game. ^{#}Rankings from AP poll. (#) Tournament seedings in parentheses. MW=Midwest Region. All times are in Pacific Time.

== Rankings ==
Ranking movements Legend: ██ Increase in ranking ██ Decrease in ranking — = Not ranked RV = Received votes т = Tied with team above or below
	Week																				
Poll	Pre	1	2	3	4	5	6	7	8	9	10	11	12	13	14	15	16	17	18	19	Final
AP	25	RV	RV	—	—	—	—	—	—	—	RV	RV	RV	RV	RV	RV	25	RV	—	—	Not released
Coaches	24	24^	RV	—	—	—	—	—	—	—	RV	RV	RV	RV	RV	RV	25–T	RV	RV	RV	RV

*AP does not release post-NCAA Tournament rankings.
^Coaches did not release a Week 2 poll.

== Awards and honors ==
=== Pac-12 Player of the Week ===
Week	Player	Opponents
11/19	Jaylen Nowell	San Diego & Santa Clara
12/10	Jaylen Nowell	Gonzaga & Seattle
1/28	Jaylen Nowell	Oregon & Oregon State
2/25	Matisse Thybulle	Utah & Colorado

=== All Pac-12 Team ===
- First team: Jaylen Nowell & Matisse Thybulle
- Honorable mention: Noah Dickerson

=== Pac-12 All-Defensive Team ===
- Matisse Thybulle

=== Pac-12 Player of the Year ===
- Jaylen Nowell

=== Pac-12 Defensive Player of the Year ===
- Matisse Thybulle

=== Pac-12 John R. Wooden Coach of the Year ===
- Mike Hopkins
