= 2018–19 California Golden Bears men's basketball team =

American college basketball season

2018–19 California Golden Bears men's basketball
- Conference: Pac-12 Conference
- Record: 8–23 (3–15 Pac–12)
- Head coach: Wyking Jones (2nd season)
- Assistant coaches: Chris Walker; Marty Wilson; David Grace
- Home arena: Haas Pavilion (Capacity: 11,877)

2018–19 Pac-12 Conference men's basketball standings
	Conf.				Overall
Team	W		L	PCT	W		L	PCT
Washington	15	–	3	.833	27	–	9	.750
Arizona State	12	–	6	.667	23	–	11	.676
Utah	11	–	7	.611	17	–	14	.548
Oregon State	10	–	8	.556	18	–	13	.581
Colorado	10	–	8	.556	23	–	13	.639
Oregon †	10	–	8	.556	25	–	13	.658
UCLA	9	–	9	.500	17	–	16	.515
USC	8	–	10	.444	16	–	17	.485
Arizona	8	–	10	.444	17	–	15	.531
Stanford	8	–	10	.444	15	–	16	.484
Washington State	4	–	14	.222	11	–	21	.344
California	3	–	15	.167	8	–	23	.258
† Pac-12 Conference tournament winner

The 2018–19 California Golden Bears men's basketball team represented the University of California, Berkeley in the 2018–19 NCAA Division I men's basketball season. This was Wyking Jones' second year as head coach at California. The Golden Bears played their home games at Haas Pavilion as members of the Pac-12 Conference. They finished the season 8–23, 3–15 in Pac-12 play to finish in last place. They lost in the first round of the Pac-12 tournament to Colorado.

On March 24, head coach Wyking Jones was fired. He finished with a two-year record of 16–47 overall and 5–31 in the Pac-12. Former Georgia and Nevada head coach Mark Fox was hired to replace him on March 29.

== Previous season ==
The Golden Bears finished the 2017–18 season with a record of 8–24, 2–16 in Pac-12 play to finish in last place. They lost in the first round of the Pac-12 tournament to Stanford.

== Off-season ==
=== Departures ===
Name	Num	Pos.	Height	Weight	Year	Hometown	Reason for departure
Austin McCullogh	12	G	6'4"	197	Freshman	Portage, MI	Transferred to City College of San Francisco
Don Coleman	14	G	6'3"	193	Junior	Augusta, GA	Transferred to South Alabama
Derek King	20	G	6'3"	198	Senior	Shanghai, China	Graduated
Nick Hamilton	21	G	6'3"	201	Senior	Inglewood, CA	Graduated
Kingsley Okoroh	22	C	7'1"	267	Senior	Derby, England	Graduated
Marcus Lee	24	F	6'11"	225	RS senior	Antioch, CA	Graduated
Deschon Winston	25	G	6'2"	175	Freshman	Lake Balboa, CA	Transferred to City College of San Francisco
Koko Jurdoghlian	30	G	6'2"	184	Sophomore	La Cañada, CA	Left team
Cole Welle	42	F	6'8"	230	Senior	Aptos, CA	Graduated

=== 2018 recruiting class ===
College recruiting
Name	Hometown	School	Height	Weight	Commit date
Jacobi Gordon #29 SF	Houston, TX	Global Learning Village	6 ft 6 in (1.98 m)	205 lb (93 kg)	May 31, 2017
Jacobi Gordon #29 SF	Recruit ratings: Scout: Rivals: 247Sports: ESPN:				
Matt Bradley #20 SG	San Bernardino, CA	Wasatch Academy	6 ft 4 in (1.93 m)	190 lb (86 kg)	Jun 1, 2017
Matt Bradley #20 SG	Recruit ratings: Scout: Rivals: 247Sports: ESPN:				
Connor Vanover #43 C	Little Rock, AR	Findlay College Prep	7 ft 3 in (2.21 m)	217 lb (98 kg)	Apr 12, 2018
Connor Vanover #43 C	Recruit ratings: Scout: Rivals: 247Sports: ESPN:				
Andre Kelly; PF	Stockton, CA	Lincoln High School	6 ft 7 in (2.01 m)	235 lb (107 kg)	Sep 3, 2017
Andre Kelly; PF	Recruit ratings: Scout: Rivals: 247Sports: ESPN:				
Overall recruit ranking:
Note: In many cases, Scout, Rivals, 247Sports, On3, and ESPN may conflict in their listings of height and weight.; In these cases, the average was taken. ESPN grades are on a 100-point scale.; Sources: "2018 California Commits". Rivals.; "2018 Team Ranking". Rivals.

== Future recruits ==
=== 2019 team recruits ===
College recruiting (2019)
Name	Hometown	School	Height	Weight	Commit date
Joel Brown; PG	Toronto, ON	Brewster Academy	6 ft 2 in (1.88 m)	175 lb (79 kg)	Oct 2, 2018
Joel Brown; PG	Recruit ratings: Scout: Rivals: 247Sports: ESPN:				
D. J. Thorpe; C	Austin, TX	Lake Travis High School	6 ft 9 in (2.06 m)	210 lb (95 kg)	Sep 21, 2018
D. J. Thorpe; C	Recruit ratings: Scout: Rivals: 247Sports: ESPN:				
Dimitris Klonaras; SG	Thessaloniki, Greece	PAOK B.C.	6 ft 6 in (1.98 m)	205 lb (93 kg)	
Dimitris Klonaras; SG	Recruit ratings: Scout: Rivals: 247Sports: ESPN:				
Lars Thiemann; C	Leverkusen, Germany	Bayern Giants Leverkusen	6 ft 11 in (2.11 m)	N/A	
Lars Thiemann; C	Recruit ratings: Scout: Rivals: 247Sports: ESPN:				
Kuany Kuany; PF	Melbourne, Australia	Prolific Prep	6 ft 9 in (2.06 m)	200 lb (91 kg)	May 9, 2019
Kuany Kuany; PF	Recruit ratings: Scout: Rivals: 247Sports: ESPN:				
Overall recruit ranking:
Note: In many cases, Scout, Rivals, 247Sports, On3, and ESPN may conflict in their listings of height and weight.; In these cases, the average was taken. ESPN grades are on a 100-point scale.; Sources: "2019 California Commits". Rivals.; "2019 Team Ranking". Rivals.

== Roster ==
2018–19 California Golden Bears men's basketball team
Players
Coaches

Pos.	#	Name	Height	Weight	Year	Previous school	Hometown
G	0	Jacob Orender (W)	6 ft 0 in (1.83 m)	178 lb (81 kg)	Sr	Lafayette	Jacksonville Beach, Florida
G	1	Darius McNeill	6 ft 3 in (1.91 m)	182 lb (83 kg)	So	Westfield HS	Houston, Texas
G	2	Juhwan Harris-Dyson	6 ft 5 in (1.96 m)	203 lb (92 kg)	So	Heritage Christian	Northridge, California
G	3	Paris Austin	6 ft 0 in (1.83 m)	185 lb (84 kg)	RS Jr	Bishop O'Dowd HS/Boise State	Oakland, California
F	10	Justice Sueing	6 ft 7 in (2.01 m)	215 lb (98 kg)	So	Mater Dei HS	Honolulu, Hawaii
G	13	Jules Erving (W)	6 ft 6 in (1.98 m)	205 lb (93 kg)	So	Holy Innocents' Episcopal School	Atlanta, Georgia
F	15	Roman Davis	6 ft 7 in (2.01 m)	210 lb (95 kg)	RS Jr	Windward HS	Carson, California
G	20	Matt Bradley	6 ft 4 in (1.93 m)	220 lb (100 kg)	Fr	Wasatch Academy	San Bernardino, California
G	21	David Serge (W)	6 ft 4 in (1.93 m)	185 lb (84 kg)	Jr	Oaks Christian	Newbury Park, California
F	22	Andre Kelly	6 ft 8 in (2.03 m)	260 lb (118 kg)	Fr	Lincoln HS	Stockton, California
F/C	23	Connor Vanover	7 ft 3 in (2.21 m)	225 lb (102 kg)	Fr	Findlay Prep	Little Rock, Arkansas
F	24	Jacobi Gordon	6 ft 7 in (2.01 m)	215 lb (98 kg)	Fr	Aspire Academy	Houston, Texas
F	34	Grant Anticevich	6 ft 8 in (2.03 m)	240 lb (109 kg)	So	Newington College	Sydney, Australia
G	35	James Zhao (W)	6 ft 3 in (1.91 m)	184 lb (83 kg)	Fr	Dulwich College Beijing	Beijing, China
F	42	Blake Welle (W)	6 ft 7 in (2.01 m)	208 lb (94 kg)	Fr	Aptos HS	Santa Cruz, California

Head coach

- Wyking Jones (Loyola Marymount)

Assistant coach(es)

- Chris Walker (Villanova)
- Marty Wilson (Pepperdine)
- David Grace (Park)

Legend

- (C) Team captain
- (S) Suspended
- (I) Ineligible
- (W) Walk-on
- Injured
- Current redshirt

Roster

== Schedule and results ==
Date time, TV	Rank^{#}	Opponent^{#}	Result	Record	High points	High rebounds	High assists	Site (attendance) city, state
Exhibition
October 30, 2018*; 7:00 pm		Cal State East Bay	W 82–62		18 – Bradley	7 – Tied	8 – Austin	Haas Pavilion (3,568); Berkeley, CA
Non-conference regular season
November 9, 2018*; 8:00 pm, ESPNU		vs. Yale; Pac-12 China Game	L 59–76	0–1	18 – Austin	10 – Kelly	2 – Tied	Baoshan Sports Centre (4,048); Shanghai, China
November 13, 2018*; 7:00 pm, P12N		Hampton; Legends Classic campus-site game	W 80–66	1–1	20 – Austin	7 – Tied	6 – Austin	Haas Pavilion (3,312); Berkeley, CA
November 15, 2018*; 7:00 pm, P12N		Detroit Mercy; Legends Classic campus-site game	Cancelled					Haas Pavilion; Berkeley, CA
November 19, 2018*; 4:00 pm, ESPN2		vs. St. John's; Legends Classic semifinals	L 79–82	1–2	21 – McNeill	9 – Sueing	2 – Tied	Barclays Center; Brooklyn, NY
November 20, 2018*; 2:00 pm, ESPNU		vs. Temple; Legends Classic consolation	L 59–76	1–3	12 – McNeill	6 – Tied	4 – Austin	Barclays Center; Brooklyn, NY
November 26, 2018*; 6:00 pm, P12N		Santa Clara	W 78–66	2–3	18 – Bradley	6 – Sueing	5 – Austin	Haas Pavilion (4,116); Berkeley, CA
December 1, 2018*; 7:00 pm, ESPNU		at Saint Mary's	L 71–84	2–4	16 – Sueing	6 – Kelly	3 – Austin	McKeon Pavilion (3,500); Moraga, CA
December 5, 2018*; 8:00 pm, P12N		San Francisco	L 60–79	2–5	17 – Kelly	9 – Kelly	8 – Austin	Haas Pavilion (4,039); Berkeley, CA
December 8, 2018*; 7:30 pm, P12N		San Diego State	W 89–83	3–5	23 – Sueing	6 – Anticevich	9 – Austin	Haas Pavilion (5,268); Berkeley, CA
December 15, 2018*; 7:00 pm, P12N		Cal Poly	W 67–66	4–5	15 – Sueing	7 – Sueing	2 – Anticevich	Haas Pavilion (3,907); Berkeley, CA
December 19, 2018*; 7:00 pm, Stadium		at Fresno State	L 73–95	4–6	20 – Tied	8 – Sueing	6 – Austin	Save Mart Center (5,836); Fresno, CA
December 21, 2018*; 7:00 pm, P12N		San Jose State	W 88–80	5–6	22 – McNeill	10 – Kelly	11 – Austin	Haas Pavilion (3,443); Berkeley, CA
December 29, 2018*; 5:00 pm, P12N		Seattle	L 73–82	5–7	20 – Austin	10 – Kelly	2 – Austin	Haas Pavilion (4,104); Berkeley, CA
Pac-12 regular season
January 3, 2019; 7:00 pm, P12N		at USC	L 73–82	5–8 (0–1)	16 – Sueing	11 – Sueing	6 – Austin	Galen Center (3,371); Los Angeles, CA
January 5, 2019; 1:00 pm, P12N		at UCLA	L 83–98	5–9 (0–2)	23 – McNeill	9 – Sueing	5 – Bradley	Pauley Pavilion (9,045); Los Angeles, CA
January 9, 2019; 6:00 pm, P12N		Arizona State	L 66–80	5–10 (0–3)	19 – Bradley	7 – Sueing	3 – Harris-Dyson	Haas Pavilion (5,827); Berkeley, CA
January 12, 2019; 7:30 pm, P12N		Arizona	L 65–87	5–11 (0–4)	27 – Sueing	5 – Sueing	2 – Tied	Haas Pavilion (7,868); Berkeley, CA
January 17, 2019; 7:00 pm, P12N		at Washington State	L 59–82	5–12 (0–5)	15 – Sueing	7 – Davis	3 – Austin	Beasley Coliseum (2,130); Pullman, WA
January 19, 2019; 2:00 pm, P12N		at Washington	L 52–71	5–13 (0–6)	14 – Kelly	8 – Sueing	3 – Tied	Alaska Airlines Arena (9,225); Seattle, WA
January 24, 2019; 8:00 pm, P12N		Colorado	L 59–68	5–14 (0–7)	13 – Austin	4 – Bradley	7 – Austin	Haas Pavilion (5,720); Berkeley, CA
January 26, 2019; 5:00 pm, ESPNU		Utah	L 64–82	5–15 (0–8)	20 – Sueing	7 – Sueing	5 – Bradley	Haas Pavilion (6,218); Berkeley, CA
February 3, 2019; 1:00 pm, ESPNU		Stanford	L 81–84	5–16 (0–9)	23 – Sueing	7 – Sueing	6 – Bradley	Haas Pavilion (7,840); Berkeley, CA
February 6, 2019; 6:30 pm, FS1		at Oregon	L 62–73	5–17 (0–10)	17 – Sueing	5 – Sueing	5 – Austin	Matthew Knight Arena (8,768); Eugene, OR
February 9, 2019; 2:30 pm, P12N		at Oregon State	L 71–79	5–18 (0–11)	16 – Sueing	5 – Austin	5 – Bradley	Gill Coliseum (5,122); Corvallis, OR
February 13, 2019; 7:00 pm, P12N		UCLA	L 67–75 ^{OT}	5–19 (0–12)	18 – McNeill	7 – Sueing	4 – Austin	Haas Pavilion (7,182); Berkeley, CA
February 16, 2019; 5:00 pm, P12N		USC	L 66–89	5–20 (0–13)	17 – Sueing	8 – Vanover	3 – Sueing	Haas Pavilion (7,345); Berkeley, CA
February 21, 2019; 6:00 pm, FS1		at Arizona	L 51–76	5–21 (0–14)	18 – Sueing	6 – Sueing	2 – Austin	McKale Center (13,737); Tucson, AZ
February 24, 2019; 3:00 pm, P12N		at Arizona State	L 59–69	5–22 (0–15)	23 – Bradley	10 – Bradley	4 – Sueing	Wells Fargo Arena (11,618); Tempe, AZ
February 28, 2019; 8:00 pm, FS1		No. 25 Washington	W 76–73	6–22 (1–15)	19 – McNeill	8 – Sueing	9 – Austin	Haas Pavilion (6,441); Berkeley, CA
March 2, 2019; 4:00 pm, P12N		Washington State	W 76–69	7–22 (2–15)	17 – McNeill	6 – Austin	6 – Bradley	Haas Pavilion (7,406); Berkeley, CA
March 7, 2019; 8:00 pm, ESPNU		at Stanford	W 64–59	8–22 (3–15)	24 – Vanover	10 – Sueing	4 – Austin	Maples Pavilion (3,822); Stanford, CA
Pac-12 tournament
March 13, 2019; 2:30 pm, P12N	(12)	vs. (5) Colorado; First round	L 51–56	8–23	17 – Bradley	5 – Bradley	3 – Sueing	T-Mobile Arena (9,748); Paradise, NV
*Non-conference game. ^{#}Rankings from AP Poll. (#) Tournament seedings in parentheses. All times are in Pacific Time.
