= Justice Sueing =

American basketball player

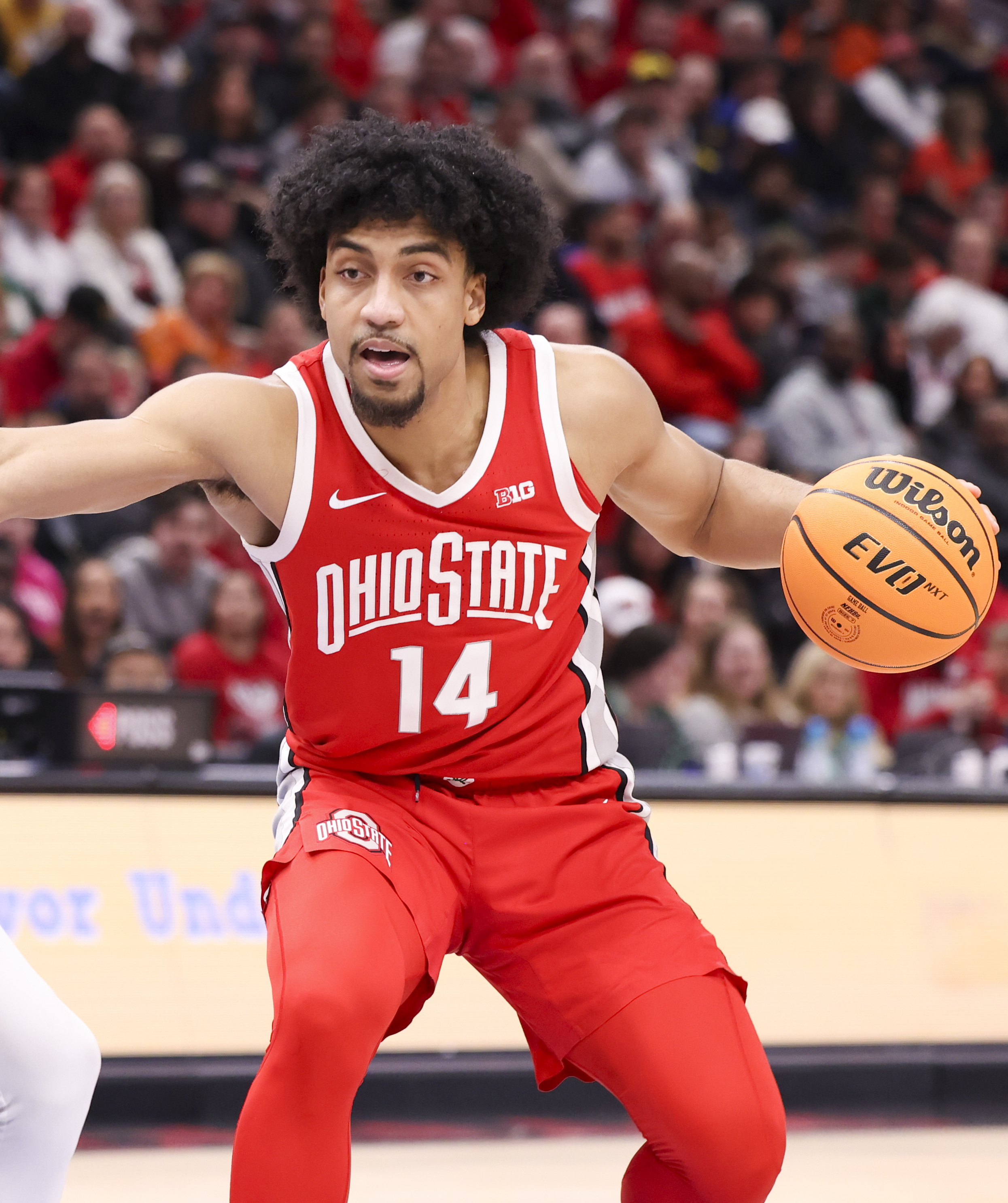
- Sueing with Ohio State in 2023

No. 22 – Rasta Vechta
- Position: Small forward
- League: Basketball Bundesliga

Personal information
- Born: March 15, 1999 (age 27) Honolulu, Hawaii, U.S.
- Listed height: 6 ft 6 in (1.98 m)
- Listed weight: 210 lb (95 kg)

Career information
- High school: Maryknoll School (Honolulu, Hawaii); Mater Dei (Santa Ana, California)
- College: California (2017–2019); Ohio State (2019–2023)
- Playing career: 2023–present

Career history
- 2023–2024: Antwerp Giants
- 2024–2025: Czarni Słupsk
- 2025–2026: Benfica
- 2026–present: Rasta Vechta

Justice Lamont Sueing Jr. (born March 15, 1999) is an American professional basketball player for Rasta Vechta of the German Basketball Bundesliga (BBL). He played college basketball for the California Golden Bears and the Ohio State Buckeyes.

== Early life and high school career ==
Sueing was born and raised in Honolulu, Hawaii and attended Maryknoll School in his hometown for his freshman and sophomore year. Sueing moved to California and transferred to Mater Dei High School for his junior and senior year. During his time at Mater Dei, he played with teammates Bol Bol, Spencer Freedman, and Michael Wang. As a junior, Sueing averaged 10.1 points, 4.8 rebounds, 1.1 assists and 1.4 steals per game. As a senior, Sueing averaged 17 points, 6.6 rebounds, 2.1 assists and 1.5 steals per game.

=== Recruiting ===
Sueing was considered a four-star recruit by ESPN and a three-star recruit by 247Sports and Rivals. On February 1, 2017, Sueing committed to playing college basketball for California over offers from Utah and Vanderbilt, among others.

College recruiting
Name	Hometown	School	Height	Weight	Commit date
Justice Sueing; SF	Honolulu, Hawaii	Mater Dei (CA)	6 ft 6 in (1.98 m)	210 lb (95 kg)	Feb 1, 2017
Justice Sueing; SF	Recruit ratings: Rivals: 247Sports: ESPN: (82)				
Overall recruit ranking: Rivals: — 247Sports: 206 ESPN: —
Note: In many cases, Scout, Rivals, 247Sports, On3, and ESPN may conflict in their listings of height and weight.; In these cases, the average was taken. ESPN grades are on a 100-point scale.; Sources: "2017 California Basketball Commitments". Rivals.; "2017 California Golden Bears Recruiting Class". ESPN.; "2017 Team Ranking". Rivals.

== College career ==
=== California ===
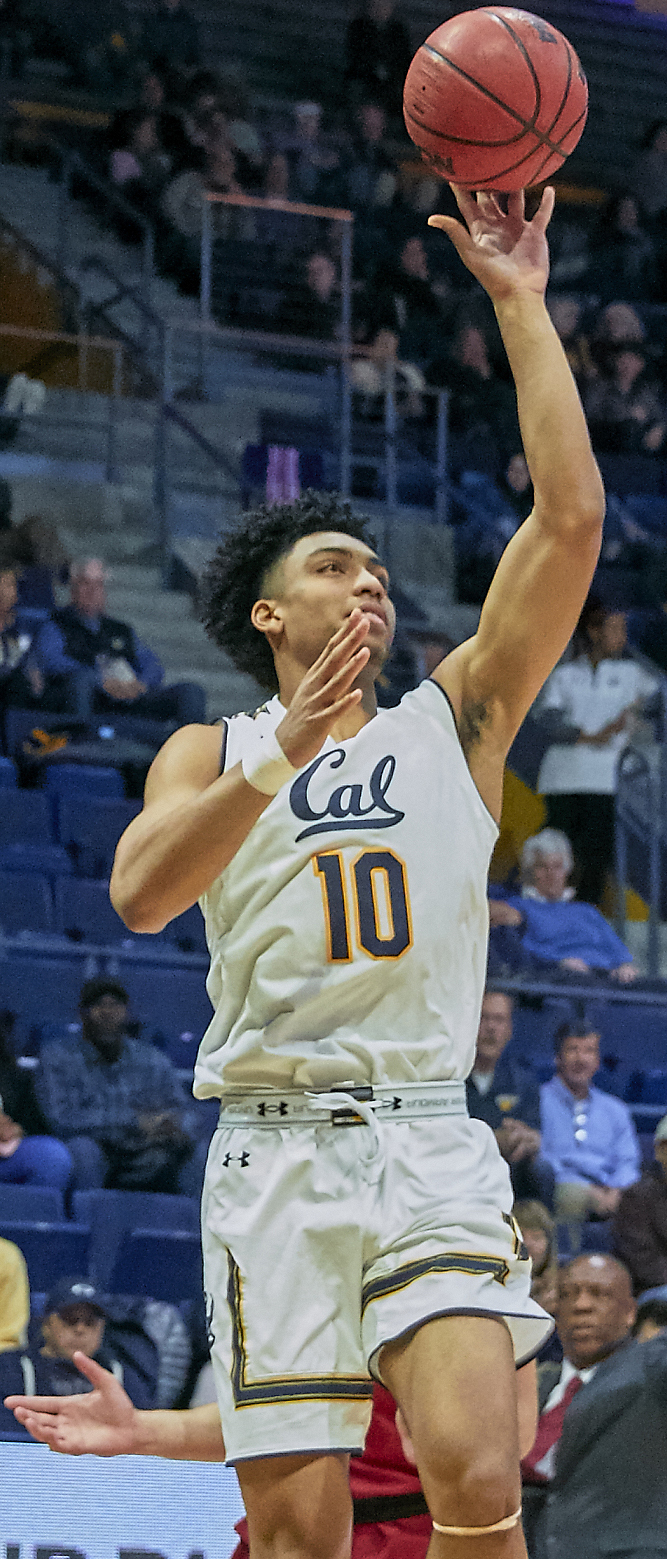
Sueing with California in 2018

Sueing started all but one game in his freshman year, playing in all 32 games and averaging 13.8 points and 5.4 rebounds per game. He scored a career-high 27 points against Washington.

He once again started every game except for one during his sophomore season, playing in all 31 games and averaging 14.3 points and 6 rebounds per game. His best game of the season came against Arizona, when he matched his career-high with 27 points. On April 7, 2019, Sueing announced his intent to transfer from California after former head coach Wyking Jones was fired.

=== Ohio State ===
On May 22, 2019, Sueing announced that he was transferring to Ohio State. In his first game at Ohio State, he scored 19 points and had 8 rebounds. As a junior, Sueing averaged 10.7 points and 5.5 rebounds per game.

On November 18, 2021, it was announced that he would miss an extended period of time due to an abdominal injury, which turned out to be the rest of the season. In two games, he averaged 6 points and 3.5 rebounds per game. Following the season, he announced he was taking advantage of the additional season of eligibility granted by the NCAA due to the COVID-19 pandemic.

== Professional career ==
On August 1, 2023, he signed with Antwerp Giants of the BNXT League.

On August 21, 2024, he signed with Czarni Słupsk in Polish Basketball League (PLK).

On August 15, 2025, he signed with Benfica of the Liga Portuguesa de Basquetebol.

== Career statistics ==
Legend
GP	Games played	GS	Games started	MPG	Minutes per game
FG%	Field goal percentage	3P%	3-point field goal percentage	FT%	Free throw percentage
RPG	Rebounds per game	APG	Assists per game	SPG	Steals per game
BPG	Blocks per game	PPG	Points per game	**Bold**	Career high

=== College ===
Year	Team	GP	GS	MPG	FG%	3P%	FT%	RPG	APG	SPG	BPG	PPG
2017–18	California	**32**	**31**	32.0	.434	.311	.672	5.4	1.4	1.5	**.5**	13.8
2018–19	California	31	30	**34.5**	.432	.302	.782	**6.0**	**2.0**	**1.7**	**.5**	**14.3**
2019–20	Ohio State	Redshirt										
2020–21	Ohio State	31	**31**	28.3	**.491**	**.361**	.750	5.5	1.5	.9	.2	10.7
2021–22	Ohio State	2	0	15.5	.385	.000	**1.000**	3.5	.0	.5	.0	6.0
Career		96	92	31.3	.446	.313	.740	5.6	1.6	1.4	.4	12.8

== Personal life ==
Sueing's father, Justice Sr., played college basketball for Hawaii and professionally in Israel and Luxembourg.
