= Legends Classic (basketball tournament) =

College basketball tournament in the US

- Logo from 2019
- Sport: College basketball
- Founded: 2007
- No. of teams: 3 (2025); 4 (2021–2024); 8 (2007–2019)
- Country: United States
- Venue: Barclays Center
- Most recent champion: Texas
- Most titles: Auburn, Pittsburgh, and Texas (2)
- Broadcaster: ESPN
- Sponsors: Vivid Seats; Old Trapper
- Website: legendsclassic.com

The Legends Classic is an annual, early-season, college basketball tournament which started in 2007 and takes place at the beginning of the college basketball season in November. Four teams (from four conferences) compete in the Legends Classic. The tournament has been held at various venues in the New York metropolitan area, primarily the Barclays Center in Brooklyn.

== History ==
The Legends Classic began in 2007 with the first two events being played at the Prudential Center in Newark, NJ. In that first year, only the four regional-round hosts were guaranteed to play four games, as Texas, Tennessee, West Virginia, and New Mexico State each hosted a pair of games, before advancing to the semifinals in Newark. Since the 2008–09 season, each team has been guaranteed to play four games.

In 2013, the field for the event decreased from 12 teams to 8 teams from eight separate conferences. Two games were held at four different regional sites selected before the tournament. Four teams advanced to the semifinals and finals at Barclays Center in New York City, while the remaining four teams played in a tournament format at a predetermined on-campus site. After a showcase format was used in 2020, following the withdrawal of teams due to COVID-19-related issues, the size of the field was reduced to four, starting in 2021, with all games played at the same venue.

In 2025, the tournament moved to a one-game showcase format, featuring Pittsburgh and UCF, with the two teams hosting Quinnipiac at their respective home arenas for campus-site games. Additionally, the tournament moved to Ocean Center in Daytona Beach.

=== Yearly champions, runners-up, and MVPs ===
Year	Winner	Score	Opponent	Tournament MVP	Other participants	Venue
2025	UCF	77–67	Pittsburgh	Riley Kugel, UCF	Quinnipiac (campus site games)	Ocean Center, Daytona Beach
2024	Texas	67–58	Saint Joseph's	Tre Johnson, Texas	Texas Tech, Syracuse	Barclays Center, Brooklyn
2023	Auburn	77–60	St. Bonaventure	Johni Broome, Auburn	Notre Dame, Oklahoma State	Barclays Center, Brooklyn
2022	Arizona State	87–62	Michigan	Desmond Cambridge Jr., Arizona State	Pittsburgh, VCU	Barclays Center, Brooklyn
2021	Virginia	58–40	Providence	Jayden Gardner, Virginia	Northwestern, Georgia	Prudential Center, Newark
2020	Changed to a Showcase due to COVID-19			Evan Mobley, USC	Boston College, BYU, Florida, St. John's, UConn, USC	Mohegan Sun Arena, Uncasville
2019	Auburn	79–65	Richmond	Austin Wiley, Auburn	New Mexico, Wisconsin	Barclays Center, Brooklyn
2018	St. John's	87–86^{OT}	VCU	Shamorie Ponds, St. John's	California, Temple	Barclays Center, Brooklyn
2017	Texas A&M	98–87	Penn State	Robert Williams, Texas A&M	Oklahoma State, Pittsburgh	Barclays Center, Brooklyn
2016	Notre Dame	70–66	Northwestern	Matt Farrell, Notre Dame	Colorado, Texas	Barclays Center, Brooklyn
2015	Marquette	78–73^{OT}	Arizona State	Henry Ellenson, Marquette	LSU, NC State	Barclays Center, Brooklyn
2014	Villanova	60–55	Michigan	Dylan Ennis, Villanova	VCU, Oregon	Barclays Center, Brooklyn
2013	Pittsburgh	88–67	Stanford	Lamar Patterson, Pittsburgh	Texas Tech, Houston	Barclays Center, Brooklyn
2012	Indiana	82–72^{OT}	Georgetown	Jordan Hulls, Indiana	UCLA, Georgia	Barclays Center, Brooklyn
2011	Vanderbilt	64–62	Oregon State	John Jenkins, Vanderbilt	NC State, Texas	Izod Center, East Rutherford
2010	Syracuse	80–76	Georgia Tech	Rick Jackson, Syracuse	Michigan, UTEP	Boardwalk Hall, Atlantic City
2009	Florida	73–58	Rutgers	Erving Walker, Florida	Michigan State, UMass	Boardwalk Hall, Atlantic City
2008	Pittsburgh	57–43	Washington State	Sam Young, Pittsburgh	Mississippi State, Texas Tech	Prudential Center, Newark
2007	Texas	97–78	Tennessee	D. J. Augustin, Texas	New Mexico State, West Virginia	Prudential Center, Newark

==== Most appearances ====
School	
Pittsburgh	5
Texas	4
Michigan	3
VCU	3
Texas Tech	3
Auburn	2
Georgia	2
NC State	2
Northwestern	2
Syracuse	2

== Brackets ==
* – Denotes overtime period

=== 2025 ===
The 2025 tournament took place at Ocean Center in Daytona Beach on November 20, 2025. Campus-site matchups took place on November 23, 2025 and November 25, 2025 at Petersen Events Center in Pittsburgh and at Addition Financial Arena in Orlando, respectively.

Tournament Game

November 20 (ESPN2); Ocean Center; Daytona Beach
Pittsburgh	67
UCF	77

Campus-site games
Home teams listed second.

Campus-site game (ACCNX); November 23
Quinnipiac	83
Pittsburgh	72

Campus-site game (ESPN+); November 25
Quinnipiac	91
UCF	102

=== 2024 ===
The 2024 tournament took place at the Barclays Center in Brooklyn, on November 21 & 22, 2024.

Semifinals; November 21; ESPN2
Syracuse	66
Texas	70
Texas Tech	77
Saint Joseph's	78

Championship; November 22; ESPNU
Texas	67
Saint Joseph's	58
Consolation Game; November 22; ESPNU
Syracuse	74
Texas Tech	79

=== 2023 ===
The 2023 tournament took place at Barclays Center in Brooklyn. It took place on November 16 & 17, 2023.

Semifinals; November 16; ESPNU/ESPN2
Oklahoma State	64
St. Bonaventure	66
Auburn	83
Notre Dame	59

Championship; November 17; ESPN2
St. Bonaventure	60
Auburn	77
Consolation Game; November 17; ESPNU
Oklahoma State	64
Notre Dame	66*

=== 2022 ===
The 2022 tournament took place at Barclays Center in Brooklyn The tournament took place from Wednesday, November 16 to Thursday, November 17, 2022.

Semifinals; November 16; ESPNU/ESPN+
20	Michigan	90
Pittsburgh	61
Arizona State	63
VCU	59

Championship; November 17; ESPN2
20	Michigan	62
Arizona State	87
Consolation Game; November 17; ESPN2
Pittsburgh	67
VCU	71

=== 2021 ===
The 2021 tournament was set to return to the Barclays Center in Brooklyn but was played at the Prudential Center in Newark. The tournament took place from Monday, November 22 to Tuesday, November 23, 2021. Texas and UCLA were originally set to play, but were replaced by Georgia and Providence.

Semifinals; November 22; ESPNU/ESPN+
Virginia	65
Georgia	55
Providence	77
Northwestern	72

Championship; November 23; ESPN2
Virginia	58
Providence	40
Consolation Game; November 23; ESPN2
Georgia	62
Northwestern	78

=== 2020 ===
The field for the tournament for the year 2020 initially included four teams instead of the usual eight due to COVID-19 concerns. BYU replaced Notre Dame after they pulled out of the field. Then later Vanderbilt withdrew from the tournament as well and the format for the competition was changed to a showcase format. The location of the tournament was also relocated to the Mohegan Sun Arena in Uncasville, Connecticut. The participants in the 2020 group included:

- Boston College
- BYU
- Florida
- St. Johns
- UConn
- USC

All games in the 2020 Tournament are televised on either ESPN or ESPN2. Due to Notre Dame and Vanderbilt not participating in the tournament, the format was changed to a showcase format with the following results.

Date	Time (EST)	Winner	Opponent	Score	Television	Top Performer/Player of the Game
December 1, 2020	2:30 pm	USC	BYU	79–53	ESPN2	Evan Mobley (USC), 17 points, 11 rebounds
December 2, 2020	5:00 pm	BYU	St. John's	74–68	ESPN2	Alex Barcello (BYU), 20 points, 5 assists, 3 rebounds
December 3, 2020	7:00 pm	UConn	USC	61–58	ESPN	Evan Mobley (USC), 17 points, 7 rebounds, 3 assists, 4 blocks
December 3, 2020	9:30 pm	Florida	Boston College	90–70	ESPN	Keyontae Johnson (Florida), 24 points, 12 rebounds

MVP: Evan Mobley (USC)

All-Tournament Team: Julian Champagnie (St. John's), Alex Barcello (BYU), James Bouknight (UConn) and Keyontae Johnson (Florida).

=== 2019 participants and bracket ===
- Auburn
- Cal State Northridge
- Colgate
- Green Bay
- McNeese State
- New Mexico
- Richmond
- Wisconsin

==== Championship Round ====
First Round; November 25; ESPN2; ESPNEWS
Wisconsin	52
Richmond	62
18	Auburn	84
New Mexico	59

Championship; November 26; ESPN2
Richmond	65
18	Auburn	79
Consolation; November 26; ESPN2
Wisconsin	50
New Mexico	59

=== 2018 participants and bracket ===
- Bowling Green
- California
- Detroit Mercy
- Hampton
- Loyola (Md.)
- St. John's
- Temple
- VCU

==== Championship Round ====
First Round; November 19; ESPN 2 ESPN3
St. John's	82
California	79
VCU	57
Temple	51

Championship; November 20; ESPN2
St. John's	87*
VCU	86
Consolation; November 20; ESPNU
California	59
Temple	76

===== Sub Regionals =====
Sub Regional Games; November 19
Bowling Green	81
Hampton	79
Detroit Mercy	91
Loyola Maryland	63

Championship Game; November 20
Bowling Green	67
Detroit Mercy	82
Consolation Game; November 20
Hampton	66
Loyola Maryland	75

=== 2017 participants and bracket ===
- Montana
- Oklahoma State
- Oral Roberts
- Penn State
- Pepperdine
- Pittsburgh
- Texas A&M
- UC Santa Barbara

==== Regionals ====
Game 1 November 10; Fox College Sports		Game 5 November 16; Fox Sports Oklahoma +
		Oral Roberts	48
Pepperdine	47	Oklahoma State	91
Oklahoma State	78

Game 2 November 13; ACC Network Extra		Game 4 November 15; ACC Network Extra
		UC Santa Barbara	62
Montana	83	Pittsburgh	70
Pittsburgh	78

Game 3 November 15; Big Ten Network		Game 7 November 24; Big Ten Network +
		Oral Roberts	48
Montana	57	Penn State	86
Penn State	70

Game 6 November 17; SEC Network +		Game 8 November 24; SEC Network
		Pepperdine	65
UC Santa Barbara	65	Texas A&M	81
Texas A&M	84

==== Championship Round ====
Semifinals; November 20; ESPN 2 ESPN3
16	Texas A&M	72
Oklahoma State	55
Penn State	85
Pittsburgh	54

Championship; November 21; ESPN2
16	Texas A&M	98
Penn State	87
Consolation; November 21; ESPNU
Oklahoma State	73
Pittsburgh	67

==== Sub Regionals ====
Sub Regional Games; November 20
Oral Roberts	64
Montana	69
UC Santa Barbara	92
Pepperdine	84

Championship Game; November 21
Montana	73
UC Santa Barbara	80
Consolation Game; November 21
Oral Roberts	76
Pepperdine	80

=== 2016 participants and bracket ===
- Bryant
- Colorado
- Eastern Washington
- Louisiana–Monroe
- Northwestern
- Notre Dame
- Seattle
- Texas

Semifinals; November 21
Notre Dame	89
Colorado	83
22	Texas	58
Northwestern	77

Championship; November 22; ESPN2
Notre Dame	70
Northwestern	66
Consolation; November 22; ESPNU
Colorado	68
22	Texas	54

=== 2015 participants and bracket ===
- Arizona State
- Belmont
- IUPUI
- Kennesaw State
- LSU
- Marquette
- NC State
- South Alabama

Semifinals; November 23
23	LSU	80
Marquette	81
NC State	76
Arizona State	79

Championship; November 24; ESPN2
Marquette	78*
Arizona State	73
Consolation; November 24; ESPNU
23	LSU	72
NC State	83*

=== 2014 participants and bracket ===
- Bucknell
- Detroit
- Maryland Eastern Shore
- Michigan
- Oregon
- Toledo
- Villanova
- VCU

Semifinals; November 24
12	Villanova	77
14	VCU	53
19	Michigan	70
Oregon	63

Championship; November 25; ESPN2
12	Villanova	60
19	Michigan	55
Consolation; November 25; ESPNU
14	VCU	77
Oregon	63

=== 2013 participants and bracket ===
- Houston
- Howard
- Lehigh
- Pittsburgh
- South Dakota State
- Stanford
- Texas Southern
- Texas Tech

Semifinals; November 25
Pittsburgh	76
Texas Tech	53
Stanford	86
Houston	76

Championship; November 26; ESPNU
Pittsburgh	88
Stanford	67
Consolation; November 26; ESPN3
Texas Tech	76
Houston	64

=== 2012 participants and bracket ===
- Duquesne
- Georgetown
- Georgia
- Indiana
- James Madison
- Liberty
- North Dakota State
- Sam Houston State
- Southern Miss
- University of California, Irvine
- UCLA
- Youngstown State

Semifinals; November 19
Georgia	53
1	Indiana	66
Georgetown	78
13	UCLA	70

Championship; November 20; ESPN
1	Indiana	82*
Georgetown	72
Consolation; November 20; ESPNU
13	UCLA	60
Georgia	56

=== 2011 participants and bracket ===
- Boston University
- Bucknell
- Cleveland State
- Hofstra
- Morehead State
- North Carolina State
- Oregon State
- Princeton
- Rhode Island
- Texas
- Vanderbilt
- West Alabama

Semifinals; November 19; ESPN3
20	Vanderbilt	86
NC State	79
Texas	95
Oregon State	100*

Championship; November 21; ESPN3
20	Vanderbilt	64
Oregon State	62
Consolation; November 21; ESPN3
NC State	77
Texas	74

=== 2010 participants and bracket ===
- Albany
- Bowling Green
- Detroit
- Gardner-Webb
- Georgia Tech
- Michigan
- Niagara
- Mercer
- Syracuse
- UTEP
- Western Carolina
- William & Mary

Semifinals; November 26; HDNet
Georgia Tech	71
UTEP	61
10	Syracuse	53
Michigan	50

Championship; November 27; HDNet
Georgia Tech	76
10	Syracuse	80
Consolation; November 27; HDNet
UTEP	65
Michigan	56

=== 2009 participants and bracket ===
- Arkansas-Fort Smith
- Cornell
- Drexel
- Michigan State
- Georgia Southern
- Florida
- Rutgers
- Toledo
- Valparaiso
- Vermont
- Troy
- UMass

Semifinals; November 27; HDNet
Rutgers	83
UMass	75
2	Michigan State	74
Florida	77

Championship; November 28; HDNet
Rutgers	58
Florida	73
Consolation; November 20; ESPNU
UMass	68
2	Michigan State	106

=== 2008 participants and bracket ===
- Akron
- Eastern Kentucky
- East Central (Ok.)
- Fairleigh Dickinson
- Indiana (Pa.)
- Mississippi State
- North Alabama
- Pittsburgh
- Texas Tech
- Thiel
- Urbana
- Washington State

Semifinals; November 28; HDNet
Washington State	63
Mississippi State	52
Pittsburgh	80
Texas Tech	67

Championship; November 29; HDNet
Washington State	43
Pittsburgh	57
Consolation; November 29; HDNet
Mississippi State	77
Texas Tech	73

=== 2007 participants and bracket ===
- Arkansas-Monticello
- La Verne
- LeMoyne–Owen
- New Mexico State
- Prairie View A&M
- Schreiner
- University of California, Santa Cruz
- Tennessee
- Texas
- University of California, Davis
- West Virginia

Semifinals; November 23; Versus
16	Texas	102
New Mexico State	87
West Virginia	72
7	Tennessee	74

Championship; November 24; Versus
16	Texas	97
7	Tennessee	78
Consolation; November 24
West Virginia	75
New Mexico State	61

== See also ==
- Barclays Center Classic
