= Wyking Jones =

American basketball coach (born 1973)

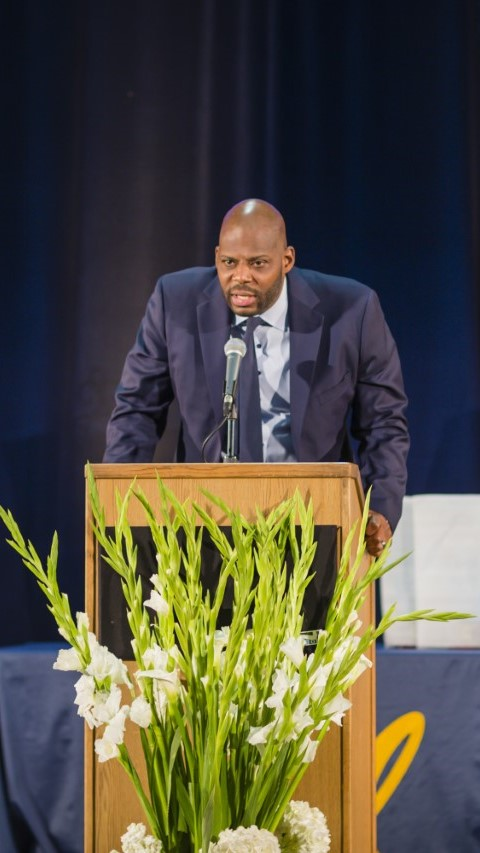

Biographical details
- Born: January 8, 1973 (age 53); Inglewood, California, U.S.

Playing career
- 1991–1995: Loyola Marymount

Coaching career (HC unless noted)
- 1996–1997: Loyola Marymount (assistant)
- 2002–2006: Pepperdine (assistant)
- 2009–2011: New Mexico (assistant)
- 2011–2015: Louisville (assistant)
- 2015–2017: California (assistant)
- 2017–2019: California
- 2021–2023: Washington (assistant)

Head coaching record
- Overall: 16–47

Wyking L. Jones (born January 8, 1973) is an American basketball coach, former college and professional player, basketball broadcasting analyst, actor, and real estate agent. He was head coach of the California Golden Bears men's basketball program for two seasons (2017–19), and was most recently an assistant coach on the men's basketball team at the University of Washington (2021–23).

As of 2026, Jones is a real estate agent in the Las Vegas area.

== Biography ==
=== Early life ===
A native of Inglewood, California, Jones attended St. Bernard High School where he played basketball and was recruited by the likes of Oregon, Oregon State, UCLA and UC Santa Barbara, but ultimately decided to attend Loyola Marymount, where he was a ball boy in elementary school.

=== Collegiate career ===
Jones attended Loyola Marymount from 1991 to 1995 under head coach John Olive. A two-time All-West Coast Conference selection, Jones emerged in a starring role his junior and senior seasons going from averaging 3.5 points per game and 2.2 rebounds per game in his first two seasons to 19.7 points per game and 8.0 rebounds per game in his junior season and 13.1 points per game and 5.9 rebounds per game in his senior year. Jones graduated with a degree in Business Administration and ended his collegiate career with 1,076 points, which is good for 24th all-time, along with 493 rebounds, which also ranks 24th all-time.

=== Professional career ===
Prior to joining the coaching ranks, Jones played professionally in Italy, France, Lebanon, Japan and South Korea from 1995 to 2001.

== Coaching career ==
=== Assistant coaching career ===
Jones got his coaching start at his alma mater for the 1996–97 season. He also served on the staff of the Nike Elite Youth Basketball League (EYBL) for three years, where he was the travel team manager for more than 45 youth basketball programs. Jones then landed at Pepperdine as an assistant under Paul Westphal from 2002 to 2006. In 2009, Jones joined the coaching staff of Steve Alford at New Mexico, helping the Lobos to 52 wins in two seasons, including a school record 30-win campaign and an NCAA Tournament berth in 2010 and NIT bid in 2011, while coaching future NBA player Tony Snell.

In 2011, Jones headed to Louisville to work for Rick Pitino, where he was part of the 2013 national championship squad, along with two Final Fours, three Elite Eights, and four Sweet 16 appearances as the Cardinals went 123–30 in the span. Jones coached the likes of Terry Rozier, Montrezl Harrell, and Gorgui Dieng while with the Cardinals.

Jones was hired by Cuonzo Martin at California in 2015, where he was part of a team that made an NCAA and NIT appearance, while also helping the Golden Bears to be the Pac-12's best defensive unit, ranking tops in the league in points per game allowed and field goal percentage allowed in 2015–16 and 2016–17. Jones is also credited for his work with Pac-12 Freshman of the Year and 2016 NBA draft selection Jaylen Brown, along with two-time All-Pac-12 selection Ivan Rabb.

=== California ===
Jones was announced as California's 17th head coach on March 24, 2017. He was officially introduced in a news conference on March 29, 2017.

On March 24, 2019, Jones was fired after posting a 16–47 record in two seasons at Cal.

=== Washington ===
Jones joined the Washington Huskies as an assistant coach under head coach Mike Hopkins, starting with the 2021–22 season.

== Acting career ==
Off the court, Jones has appeared in movies such as Dope, The Wood, The Benchwarmers, and Brown Sugar and has been dubbed one of "College hoops' most interesting people" by ESPN in part due to his unique part-time acting career.

== Personal ==
Jones has a son, Jameel, and daughter, Zoe.

== Head coaching record ==
Record table
Season	Team	Overall	Conference	Standing	Postseason
California Golden Bears (Pac-12 Conference) (2017–2019)
2017–18	California	8–24	2–16	12th	
2018–19	California	8–23	3–15	12th	
California:		16–47 (.254)	5–31 (.139)		
Total:		16–47 (.254)			
