= Mike Hopkins (basketball) =

American basketball player and coach (born 1969)

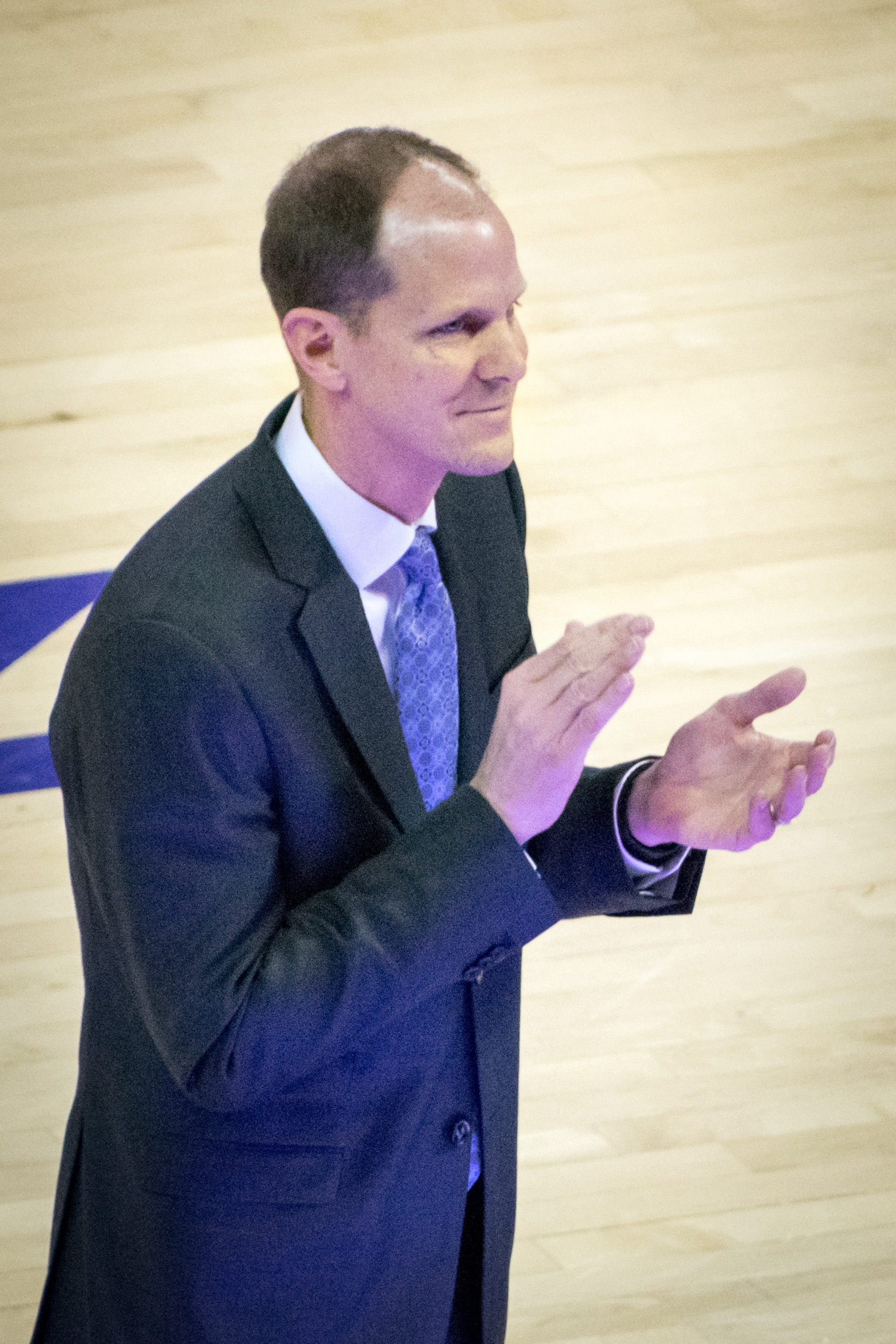
- Hopkins in 2019

New Orleans Pelicans
- Title: Assistant coach / head of player development
- League: NBA

Personal information
- Born: August 6, 1969 (age 57) San Mateo, California, U.S.
- Listed height: 6 ft 5 in (1.96 m)

Career information
- High school: Mater Dei (Santa Ana, California)
- College: Syracuse (1989–1993)
- NBA draft: 1993: undrafted
- Position: Shooting guard
- Coaching career: 1995–present

Career history

Coaching
- 1995–2015: Syracuse (assistant)
- 2015–2016: Syracuse (interim)
- 2016–2017: Syracuse (assistant)
- 2017–2024: Washington
- 2024–2025: Phoenix Suns (assistant)
- 2025–present: New Orleans Pelicans (assistant / head of player development)

Career highlights
- As head coach: 2× NABC District 20 Coach of the Year (2018, 2019); 2× Pac-12 Coach of the Year (2018, 2019); As assistant coach: NCAA champion (2003); Big East Tournament champion (2005)

Michael Griffith Hopkins (born August 6, 1969) is an American professional basketball coach who is an assistant coach and the head of player development for the New Orleans Pelicans of the National Basketball Association (NBA). Previously, he was a longtime assistant at Syracuse University before taking over as head coach for the University of Washington from 2017 until 2024. He spent one season as an assistant coach for the Phoenix Suns from 2024 to 2025.

The 6-foot-5 Hopkins, from Laguna Hills, California, was a fan favorite during his playing days at Syracuse, known for his all-out hustle and general scrappy play.

== High school career ==
Born in the Northern California city of San Mateo and raised in the Southern California city of Laguna Hills, Hopkins was a member of the 1987 California state championship team at Mater Dei High School in Santa Ana, California that also featured future NBA player LeRon Ellis. Having graduated from Mater Dei in 1988, Hopkins enrolled at Syracuse while Ellis went on to a two-year career at the University of Kentucky. After Kentucky was placed on probation, Hopkins would play an instrumental role in convincing his high school teammate to transfer to Syracuse.

== College career ==
Mike Hopkins College Career
Season	G	FG%	FT%	Reb	Pts
1989–90	20	.556	.750	1.2	2.9
1990–91	31	.514	.548	1.9	3.3
1991–92	31	.448	.629	3.9	6.5
1992–93	29	.438	.738	3.7	9.2
Totals	111	.462	.670	2.8	5.7

Hopkins played sparingly in his first two seasons at Syracuse before becoming the team's starting shooting guard in his junior year. That year, Hopkins hit the game-winning free throws with three seconds remaining against Connecticut to propel the Orange to the 1992 Big East Championship.

Hopkins was named captain in his senior season and posted a career high of 9.2 points and added 3.7 rebounds per game. He also had a flair for the clutch, heaving a three-quarter court pass to Conrad McRae for a buzzer-beating, game-winning shot against Villanova. In his final game in the Carrier Dome, Hopkins scored a game-high 20 points and tallied six rebounds and five assists in a 78–74 win over Pittsburgh.

Hopkins played 111 games throughout his four-year career spanning from 1989 to 1993. He finished with averages of 5.7 points and 2.8 rebounds per game.

== Professional career ==
Hopkins spent time in the Continental Basketball Association with the Minnesota-based Rochester Renegade as well as the Atlantic Basketball Association's Hazleton Hawks. He also played in Europe with teams in the Netherlands and Turkey.

== Coaching career ==
=== Syracuse ===
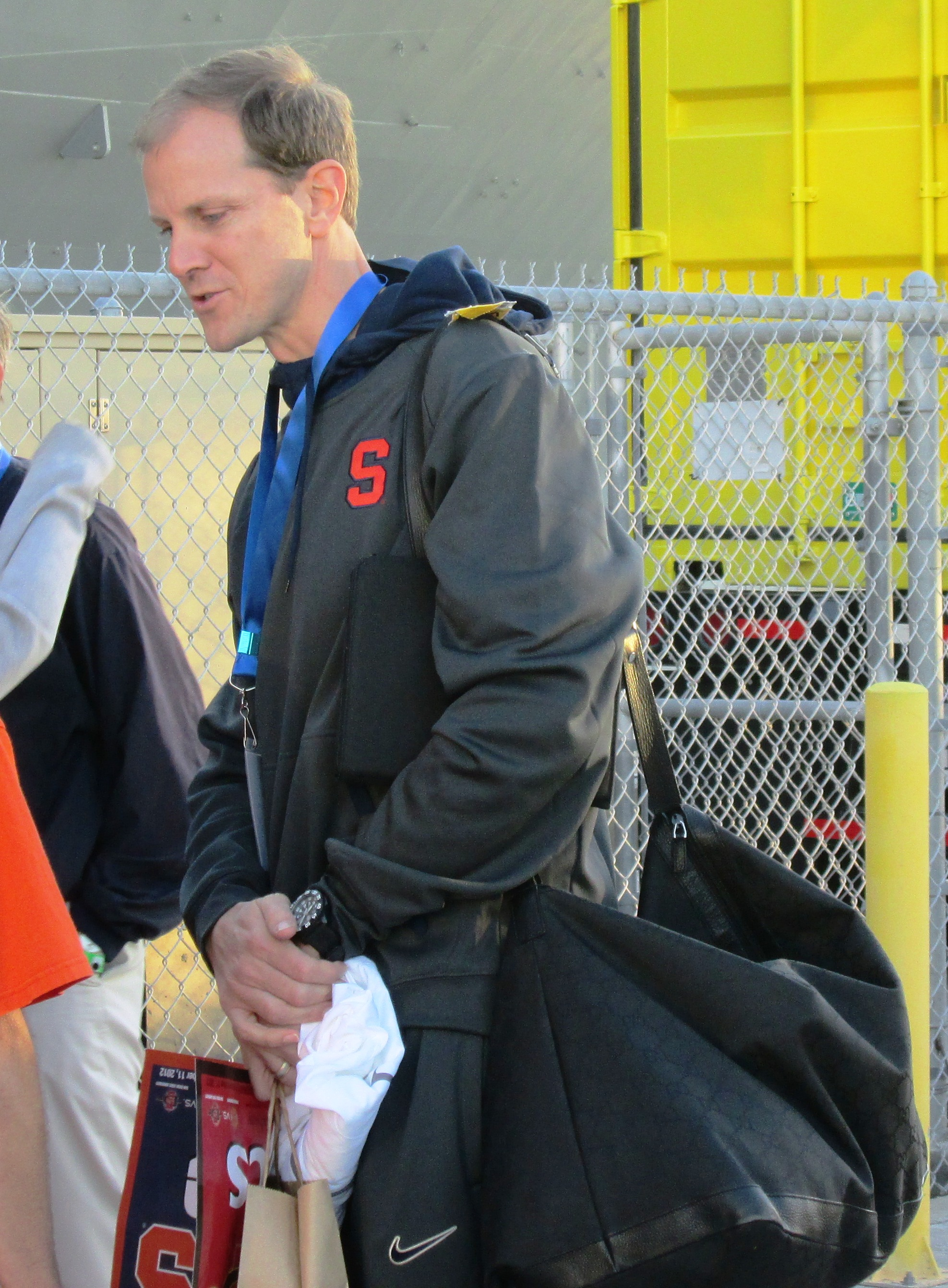
Mike Hopkins in 2012

Hopkins returned to Syracuse in 1995 and was primarily involved with recruiting and the development of guards. Hopkins played a large role in developing future NBA player Jason Hart and SU standout Allen Griffin. He has also been credited for recruiting Gerry McNamara and Billy Edelin.

In May 2007, it was reported that Hopkins was picked to be Jim Boeheim's successor, even though there was no timetable for Boeheim to retire. However, in October, Athletic Director Daryl Gross refuted that story, saying that his quote was taken out of context.

Away from Syracuse, Hopkins was the Court Coach for Team USA in 1998, 2000, 2001, 2010, and 2012.

In March 2010, Hopkins' name surfaced in connection with the head coaching vacancy at Charlotte. Hopkins was reported to be a finalist for the Oregon State University head coaching vacancy in May 2014.

On June 25, 2015, Hopkins was formally named Men's Basketball Head Coach-Designate by Syracuse University.

Hopkins served as head coach during Jim Boeheim's controversial nine-game suspension from December 5, 2015, to January 5, 2016. Hopkins later received credit as coach for the nine games while Boeheim was suspended.

=== Washington ===
On March 19, 2017, Hopkins was announced as head basketball coach at the University of Washington for the 2017–18 season. Hopkins signed a six-year deal worth $12.3 million. He earned $1.8 million in his first year and an additional $100,000 each subsequent year.

Coach Hopkins earned the Pac-12's Coach of the Year award in each of his first two seasons at the University of Washington, leading the Huskies to a regular -season conference title in the 2018–19 season.

On March 8, 2024, the University of Washington announced Hopkins would not return for the 2024–25 season.

=== Phoenix Suns ===
On June 11, 2024, the Phoenix Suns hired Hopkins as an assistant under new head coach Mike Budenholzer. His addition was made official on August 6.

=== New Orleans Pelicans ===
On August 5, 2025, Hopkins was hired by the New Orleans Pelicans as the team's head of player development/assistant coach under head coach Willie Green.

== Head coaching record ==
Record table
Season	Team	Overall	Conference	Standing	Postseason
Syracuse Orange (Atlantic Coast Conference) (2015–2016)
2015–16	Syracuse	4–5	0–3	T–9th*	NCAA Division I Final Four*
Syracuse:		4–5 (.444)	0–3 (.000)		
Washington Huskies (Pac-12 Conference) (2017–2024)
2017–18	Washington	21–13	10–8	T–6th	NIT second round
2018–19	Washington	27–9	15–3	1st	NCAA Division I Round of 32
2019–20	Washington	15–17	5–13	12th	
2020–21	Washington	5–21	4–16	11th	
2021–22	Washington	17–15	11–9	T–5th	
2022–23	Washington	16–16	8–12	T–8th	
2023–24	Washington	17–15	9–11	T–6th	
Washington:		118–106 (.527)	62–72 (.463)		
Total:		122–111 (.524)			
National champion Postseason invitational champion Conference regular season champion Conference regular season and conference tournament champion Division regular season champion Division regular season and conference tournament champion Conference tournament champion

* Syracuse head coach Jim Boeheim was suspended for nine games, during which Hopkins served as the interim head coach and was credited for those games.
