= Bradwell Institute =

Secondary school in Georgia, United States

Coordinates: 31°50′57″N 81°36′15″W

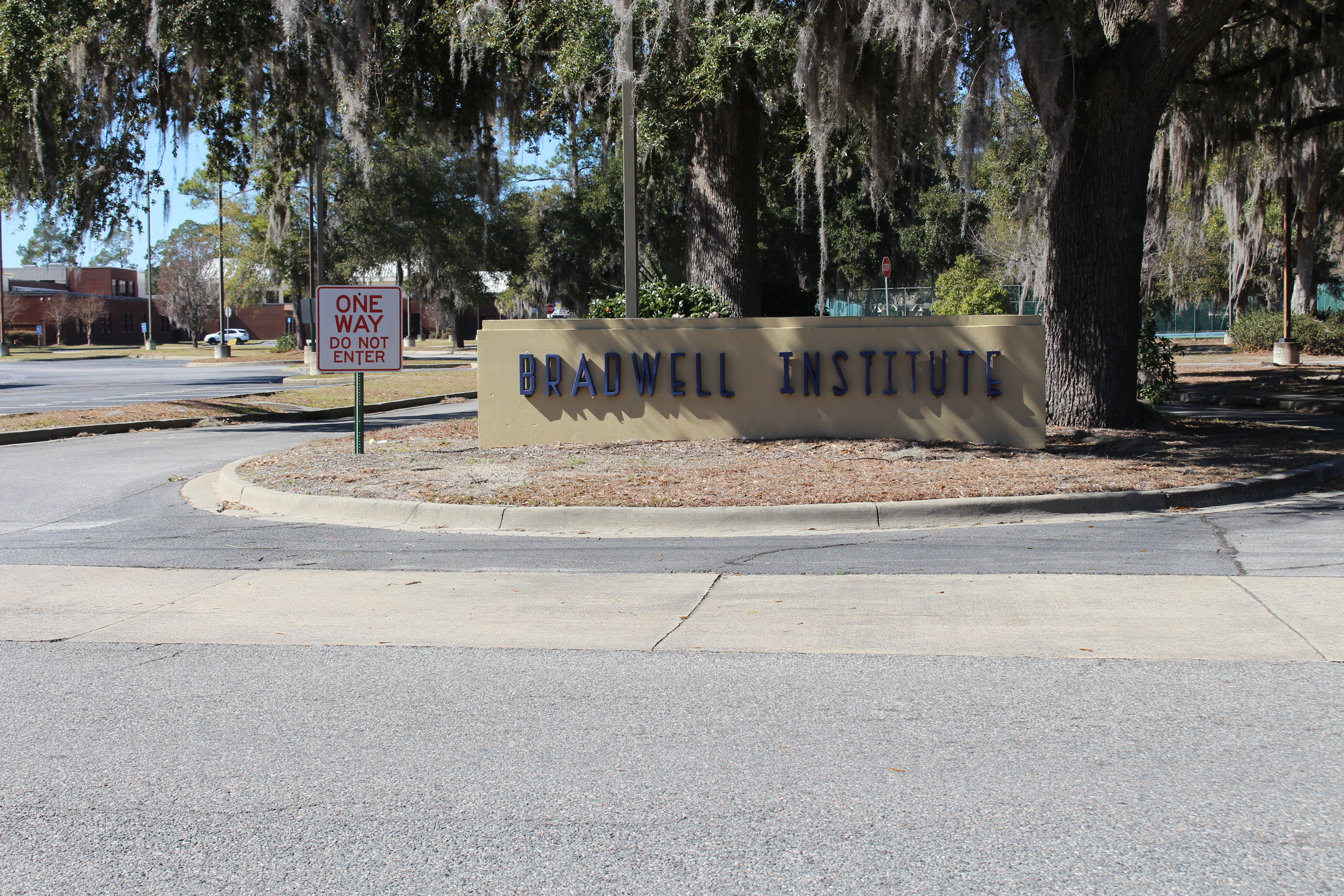

Information
- Established: 1871; 155 years ago
- Principal: Dr. Mary Ryan
- Grades: 9-12
- Enrollment: c.1600
- Website: https://bradwellinstitute.org/

Bradwell Institute is a public high school located in Hinesville, Georgia, United States. It serves the western half of Hinesville, western Fort Stewart, Walthourville, Allenhurst, and Gumbranch. It is a part of the Liberty County School District.

Its principal is Dr.Mary Ryan.

Bradwell serves grades 9–12 with about 1,600 students currently enrolled.

School activities include football, basketball, baseball, softball, cheerleading, soccer, volleyball, golf, tennis, cross country, track & field, and rifle team JROTC.

== History ==
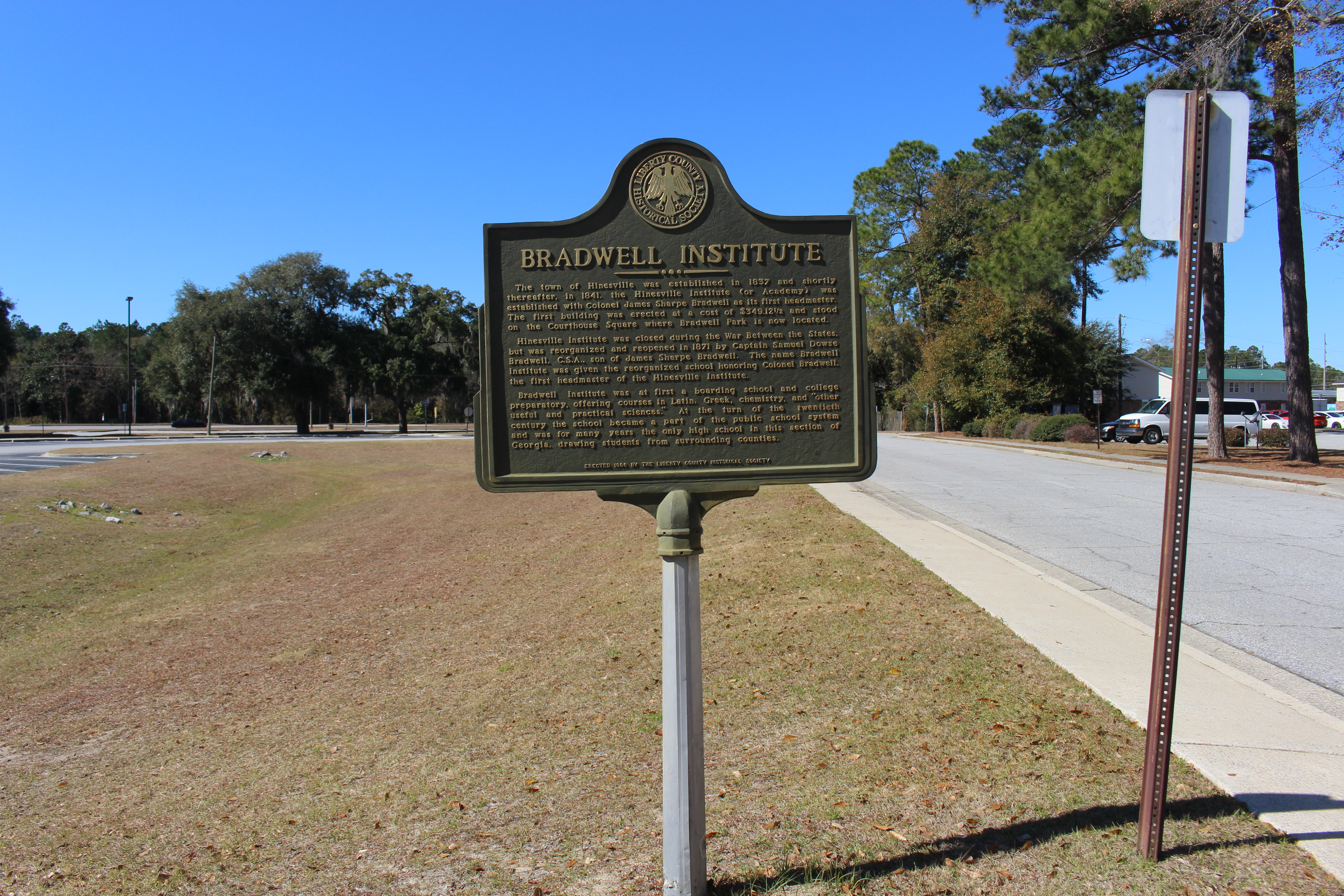
Historical marker

According to the school's website:

"Bradwell Institute was founded in 1871 by Captain Samuel Dowse Bradwell, C.S.A, and others, succeeding the Hinesville Institute, which had closed during the American Civil War. The school was named for Colonel James Sharpe Bradwell, father of Captain Bradwell. For many years, Bradwell Institute was a private school where students paid tuition and boarded in private homes. Thereafter it became a 12-year public school. Today, Bradwell Institute is a public comprehensive high school with a curriculum that is geared to the interests and needs of students of different ability levels and educational backgrounds. Bradwell also offers a variety of student activities to match the varied interests of the student body. The school is continually upgrading facilities and equipment in order to keep up with the changes occurring in education and business today."

=== Official GHSA State Titles ===
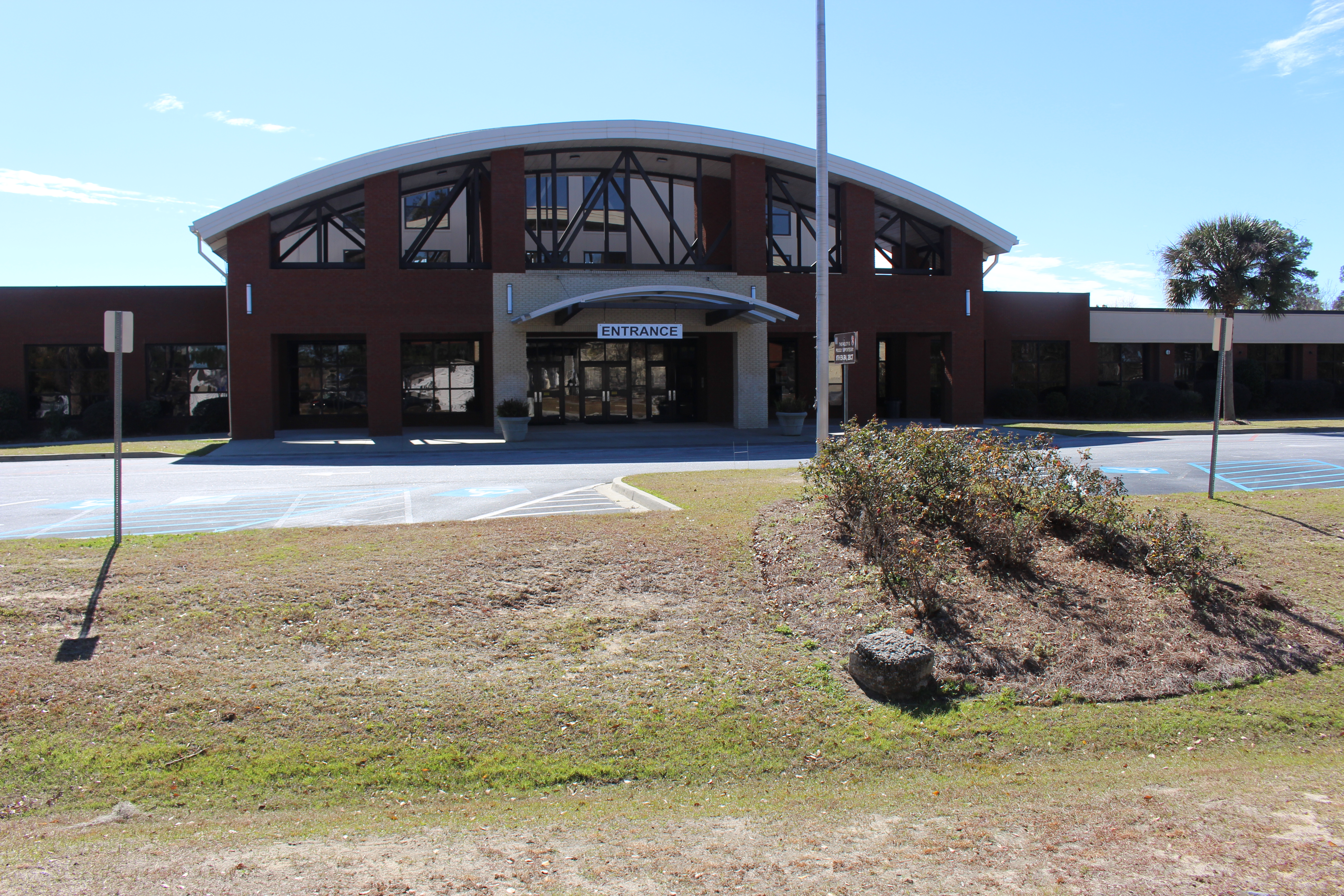
Main building

- Baseball (1) - 1976(2A)
- Football (1) - 1965(B)

== Notable alumni ==
- Gary Guyton, former NFL player
- Ulrick John, former NFL player
- DeLisha Milton-Jones, former WNBA player
- Will Pettis, Arena Football Hall of Fame player
- Kevin Harris, Current RB for the New England Patriots
