= Kevin Harris (American football) =

American football player (born 2000)

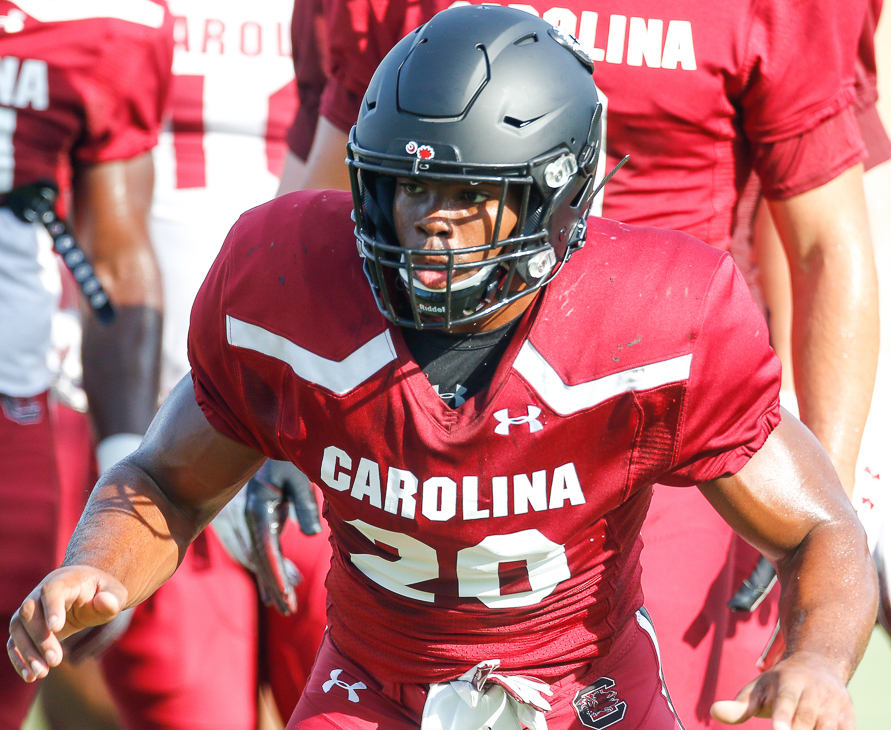
- Harris with the South Carolina Gamecocks in 2019

Profile
- Position: Running back

Personal information
- Born: November 17, 2000 (age 25); Hinesville, Georgia, U.S.
- Listed height: 5 ft 10 in (1.78 m)
- Listed weight: 225 lb (102 kg)

Career information
- High school: Bradwell Institute (Hinesville)
- College: South Carolina (2019–2021)
- NFL draft: 2022: 6th round, 183rd overall pick

Career history
- New England Patriots (2022–2024); Jacksonville Jaguars (2025)*; Ottawa Redblacks (2026)*
- * Offseason or practice squad member only

Awards and highlights
- First-team All-SEC (2020)

Career NFL statistics as of 2023
- Rushing yards: 117
- Rushing average: 3.4
- Rushing touchdowns: 2
- Receptions: 3
- Receiving yards: 58
- Stats at Pro Football Reference

Kevin Harris (born November 17, 2000) is an American professional football running back. He played college football for the South Carolina Gamecocks.

== Early life ==
Harris grew up in Hinesville, Georgia and attended Bradwell Institute. He was named the Georgia Region 2-6A Player of the Year after rushing for 1,680 yards and 16 touchdowns in his junior year. As a senior, Harris rushed for 1,556 yards and 22 touchdowns and was named the Region 2-6A Player of the Year for the second straight season. Harris committed to play college football at South Carolina over offers from Army, Air Force, Navy, Cornell, Furman, The Citadel, Middle Tennessee State, Tulane and Wofford.

== College career ==
Harris rushed 21 times for 179 yards and four touchdowns as a true freshman. He was named the Gamecocks starting running back several weeks into his sophomore season. Against Ole Miss, Harris rushed for 243 yards, the fifth-most in school history, and five touchdowns. He finished the season with 1,138 yards and 15 touchdowns on 185 carries and caught 21 passes for 159 yards and one touchdown.

== Professional career ==
Pre-draft measurables
Height	Weight	Arm length	Hand span	Wingspan	40-yard dash	10-yard split	20-yard split	20-yard shuttle	Three-cone drill	Vertical jump	Broad jump	Bench press
5 ft 9 7/8 in (1.77 m)	221 lb (100 kg)	31 1/4 in (0.79 m)	9 1/4 in (0.23 m)	6 ft 4 3/4 in (1.95 m)	4.62 s	1.66 s	2.62 s	4.26 s	7.39 s	38.5 in (0.98 m)	10 ft 6 in (3.20 m)	21 reps
All values from NFL Combine/Pro Day

=== New England Patriots ===
Harris was selected by the New England Patriots in the sixth round, 183rd overall, in the 2022 NFL draft. He was waived on August 30, 2022, and signed to the practice squad the next day. He was promoted to the active roster on October 13, 2022. In Week 14 against the Arizona Cardinals, he had his first professional touchdown on a 14-yard rush in the 27–13 victory. He appeared in five games as a rookie. He finished with 18 carries for 52 rushing yards and one rushing touchdown.

On August 29, 2023, Harris was waived by the Patriots and re-signed to the practice squad. He was promoted to the active roster on December 19.

Harris was waived by the Patriots on August 27, 2024, and re-signed to the practice squad.

=== Jacksonville Jaguars ===
On August 19, 2025, Harris was signed by the Jacksonville Jaguars. He was waived on August 26 as part of final roster cuts.

=== Ottawa Redblacks ===
On July 26, 2026, Harris was signed to the practice roster of the Ottawa Redblacks of the Canadian Football League (CFL). On August 3, he was released.
