= Liberty County School District (Georgia) =

School district in Georgia (U.S. state)

Address
- 200 Bradwell Street Hinesville, Georgia, 31313-2706; United States
- Coordinates: 31.852033°N 81.591961°W

District information
- Grades: Pre-school - 12
- Superintendent: Mrs. Debra B. Frazier
- Accreditations: Southern Association of Colleges and Schools; Georgia Accrediting Commission; AdvancED
- NCES District ID: 1303300

Students and staff
- Enrollment: 10,100
- Faculty: 674

Other information
- Telephone: (912) 876-2161
- Website: www.liberty.k12.ga.us

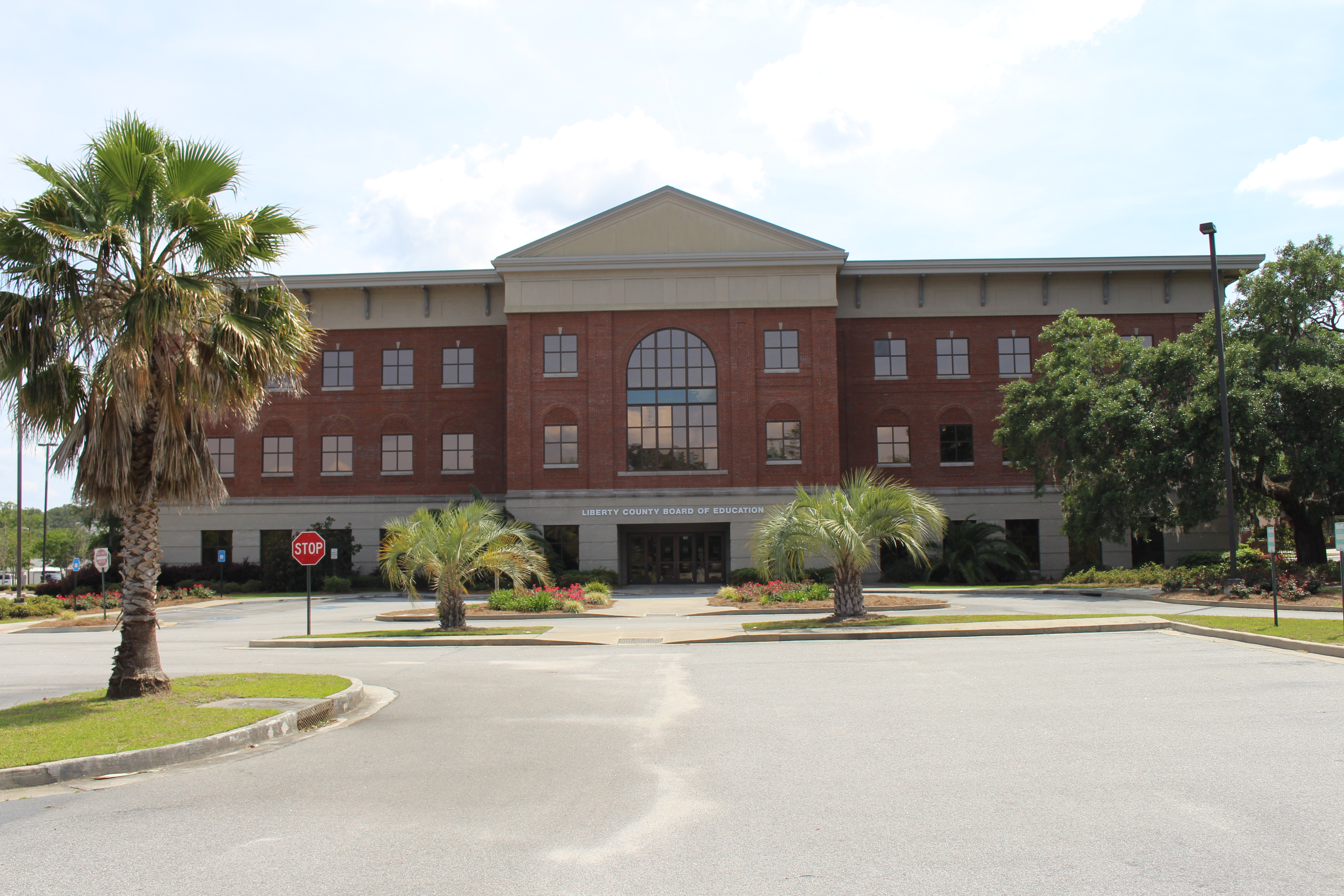
School district headquarters

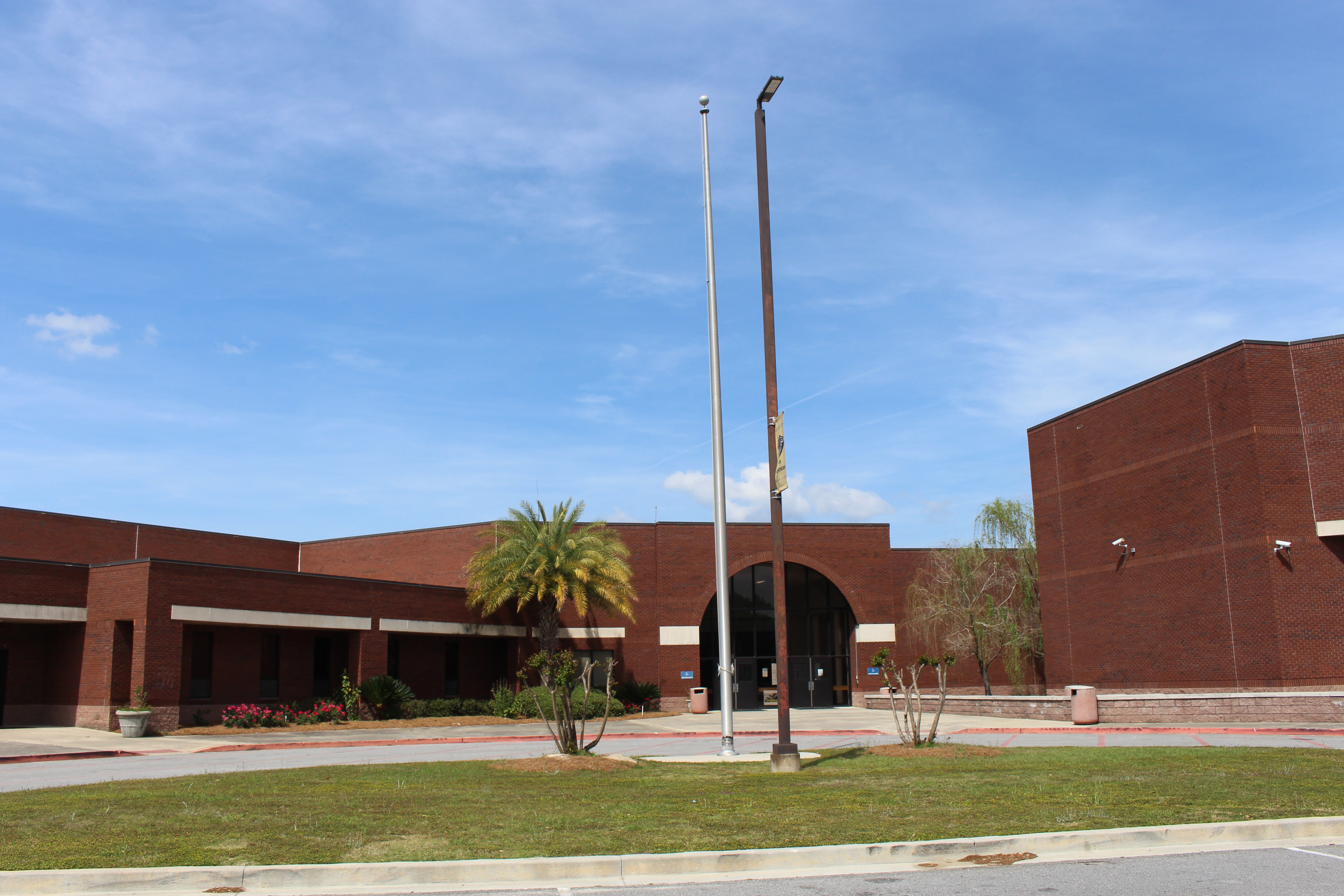
Liberty County High School

The Liberty County School District, or the Liberty County School System (LCSS), is a public school district in Liberty County, Georgia, United States, based in Hinesville. It serves the communities of Allenhurst, Flemington, Gumbranch, Hinesville, Midway, Riceboro, and Walthourville.

It is the designated school district for grades K-12 for the county, except parts in Fort Stewart. Fort Stewart has the Department of Defense Education Activity (DoDEA) as its local school district, for the elementary level. Students at the secondary level on Fort Stewart attend public schools operated by county school districts.

== Schools ==
The Liberty County School District has seven elementary schools, three middle schools, and two high schools.

=== Elementary schools ===
- Button Gwinnett Elementary School
- Liberty Elementary School
- Frank Long Elementary School
- Lyman Hall Elementary School
- Joseph Martin Elementary School
- Waldo Pafford Elementary School
- Taylors Creek Elementary School

=== Middle schools ===
- Lewis Frasier Middle School
- Midway Middle School
- Snelson-Golden Middle School

=== High schools ===
- Bradwell Institute
- Liberty County High School

== Gallery ==
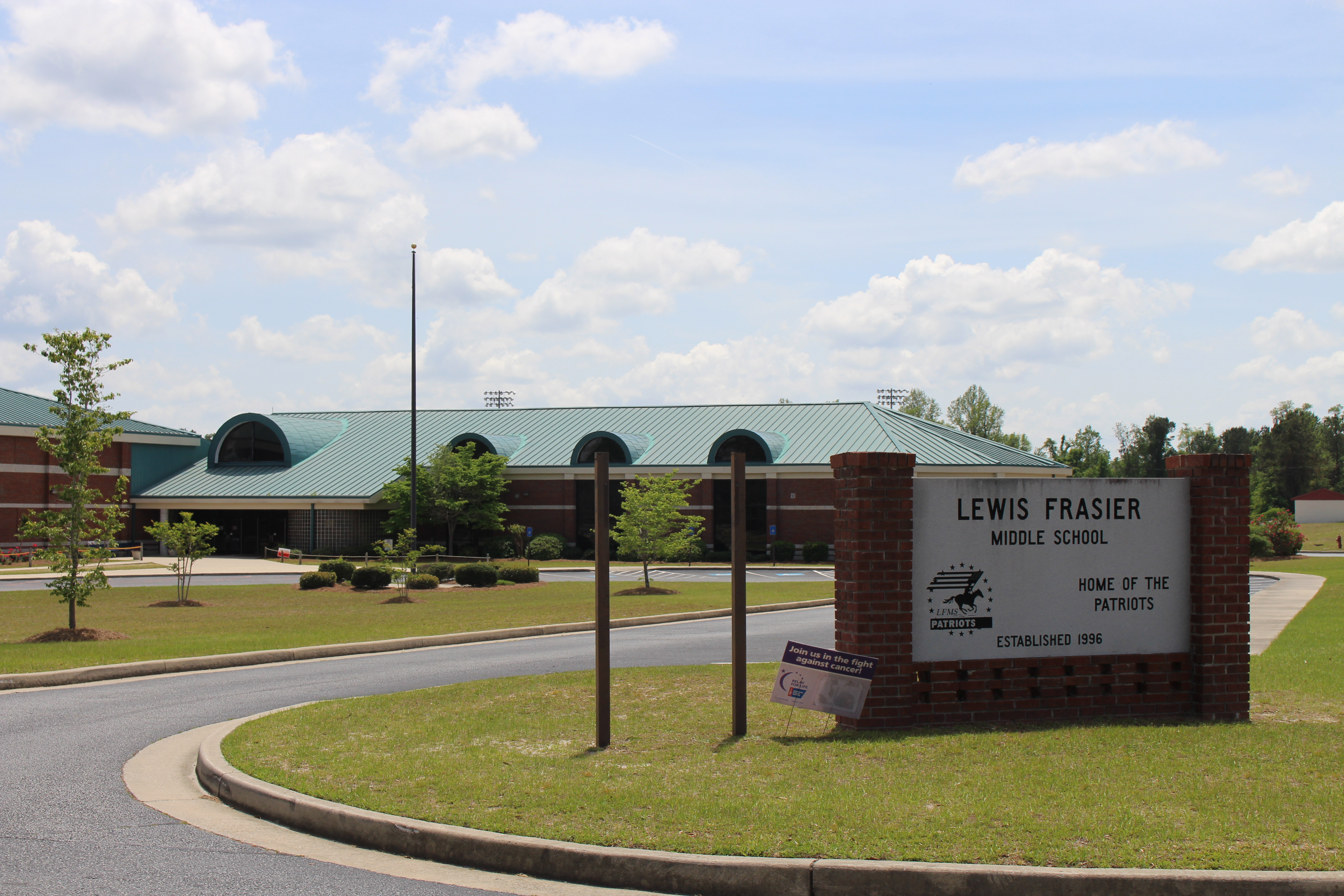
Lewis Fraser Middle School

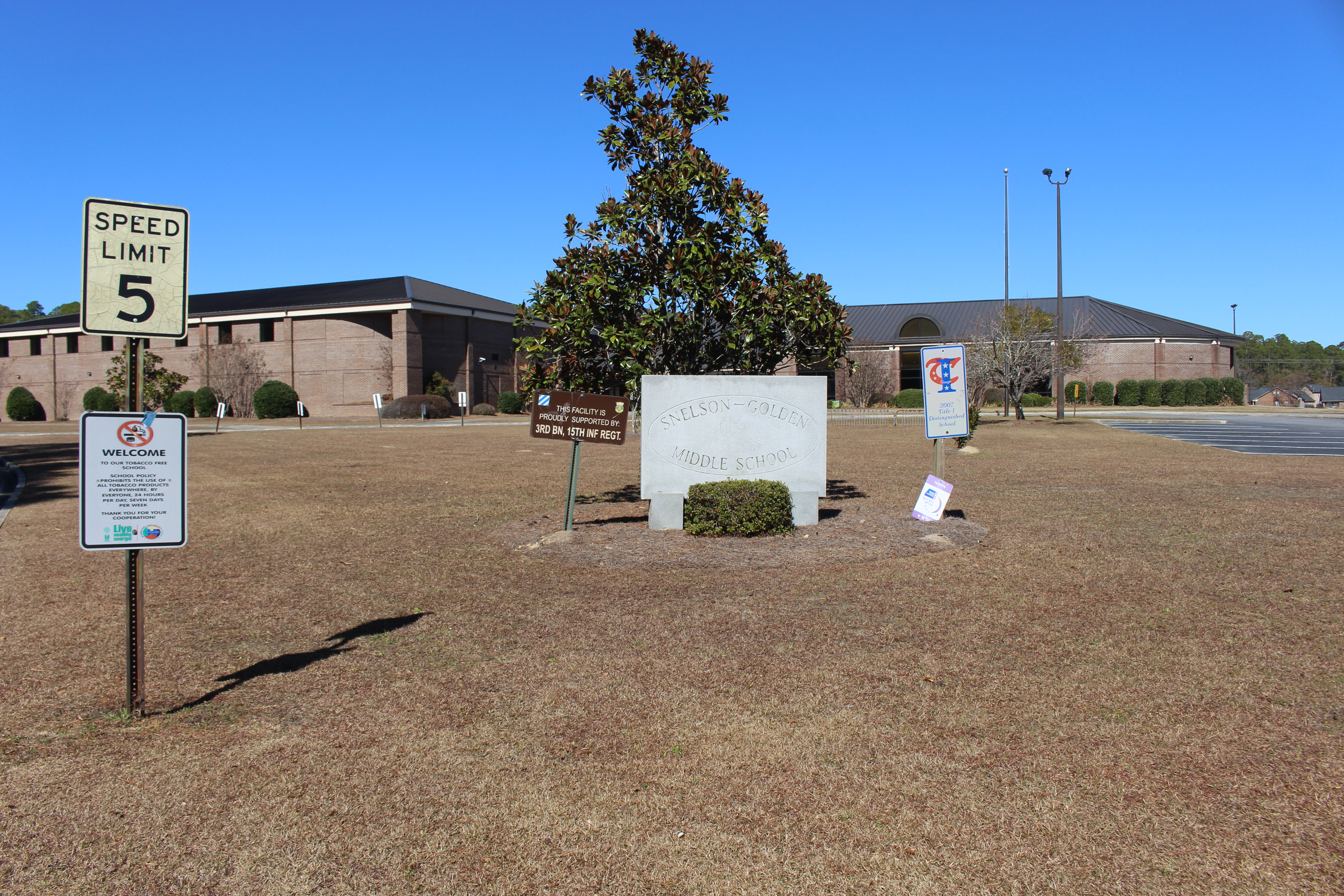
Snelson-Golden Middle School

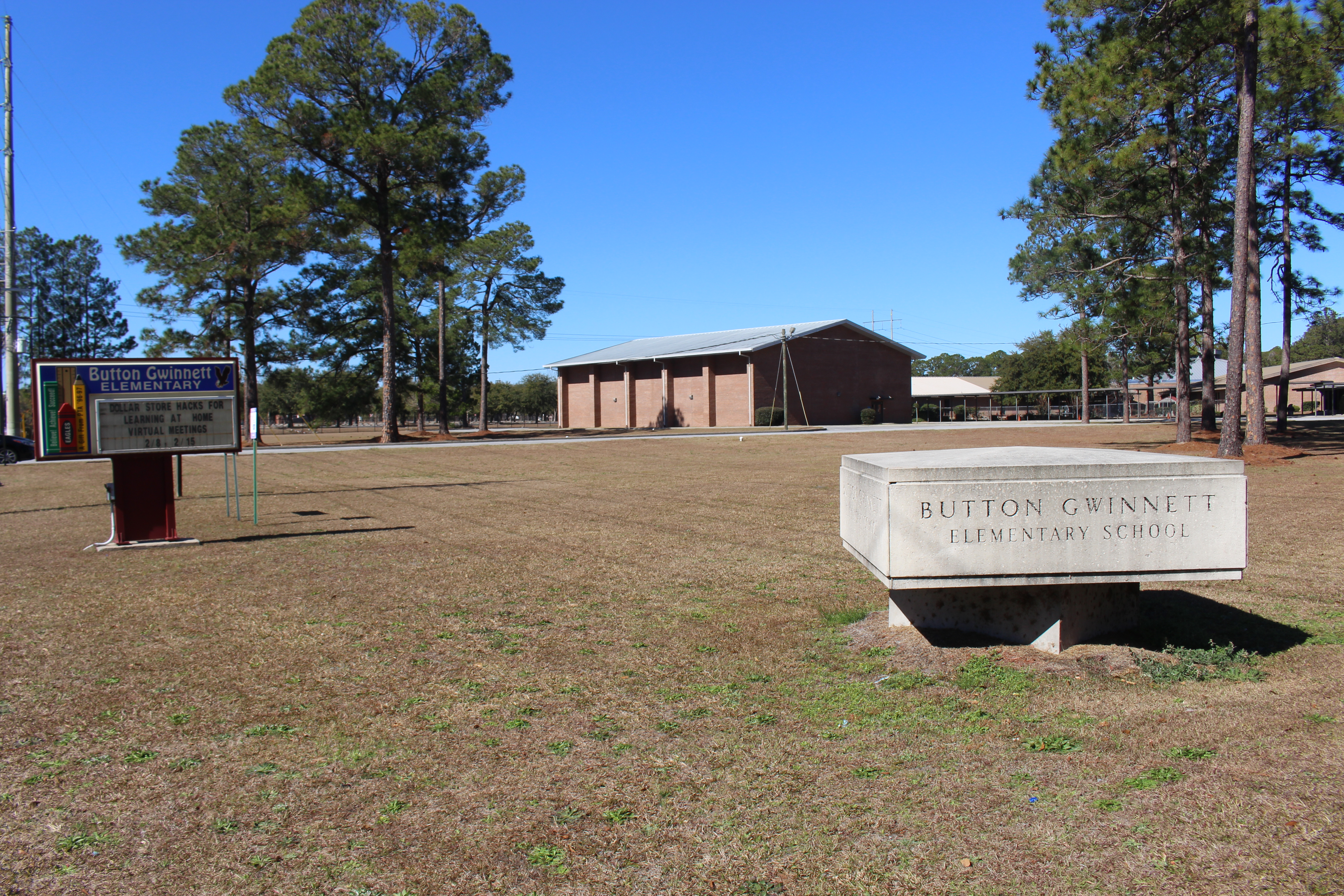
Button Gwinnett Elementary School

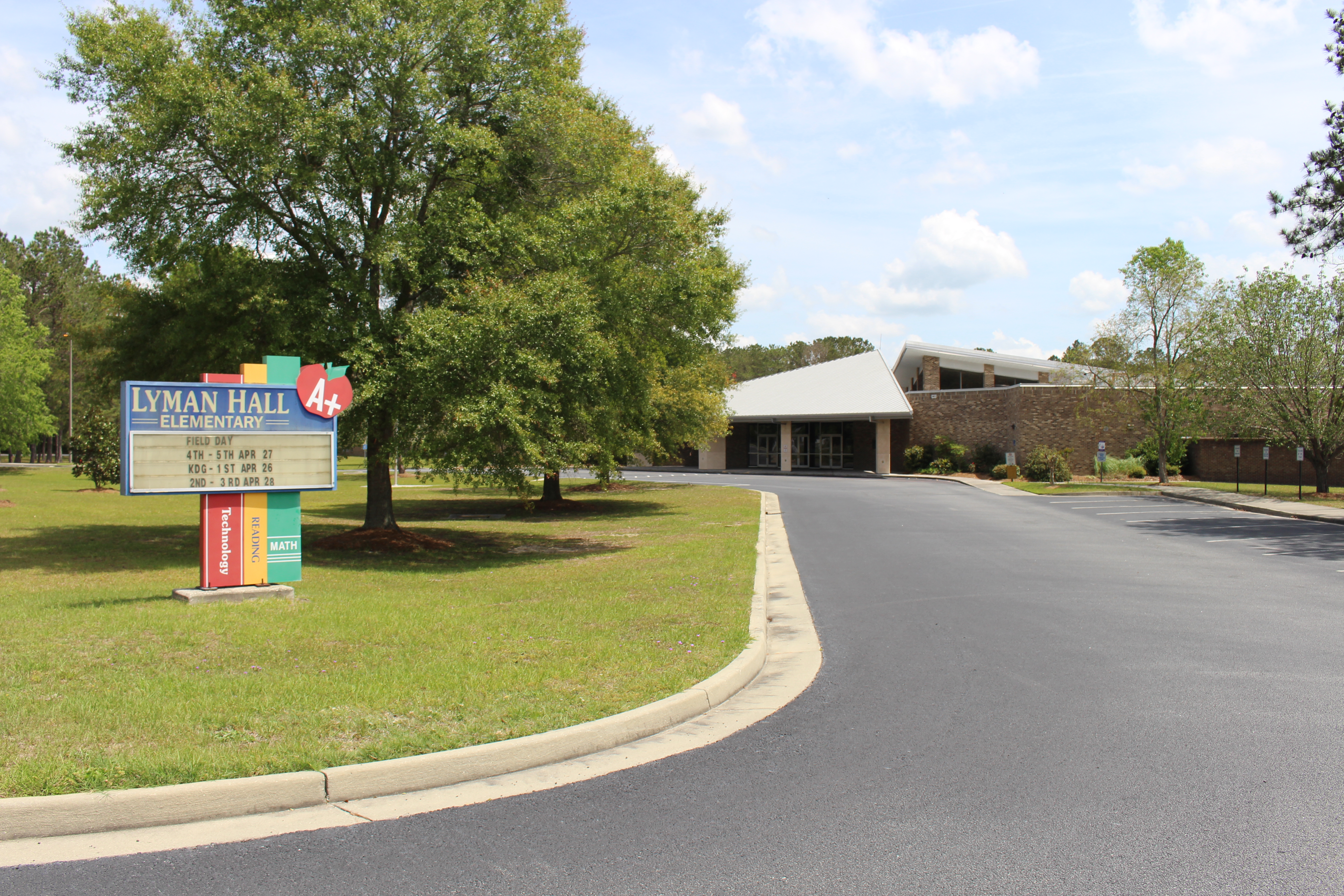
Lyman Hall Elementary School

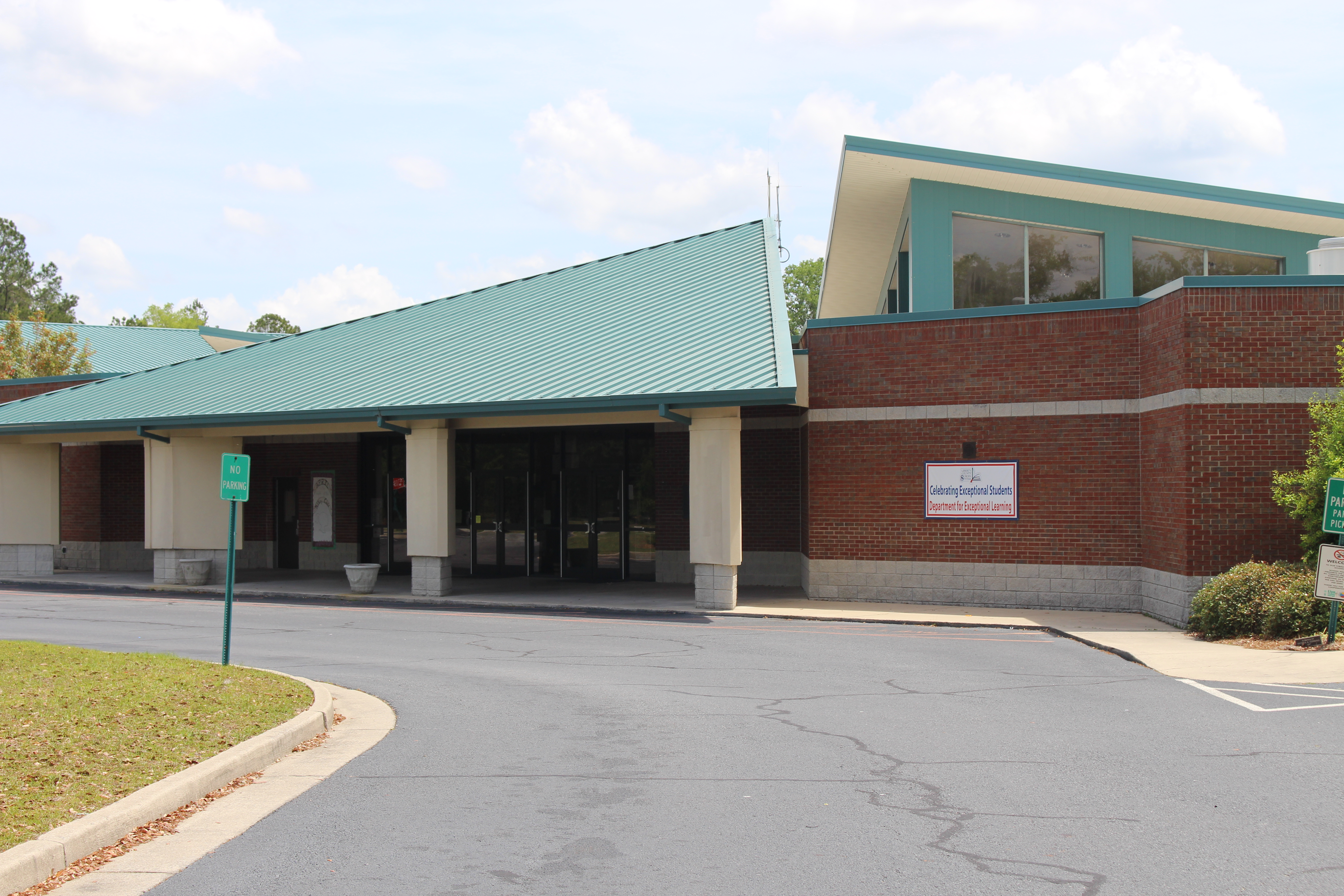
Frank Long Elementary School

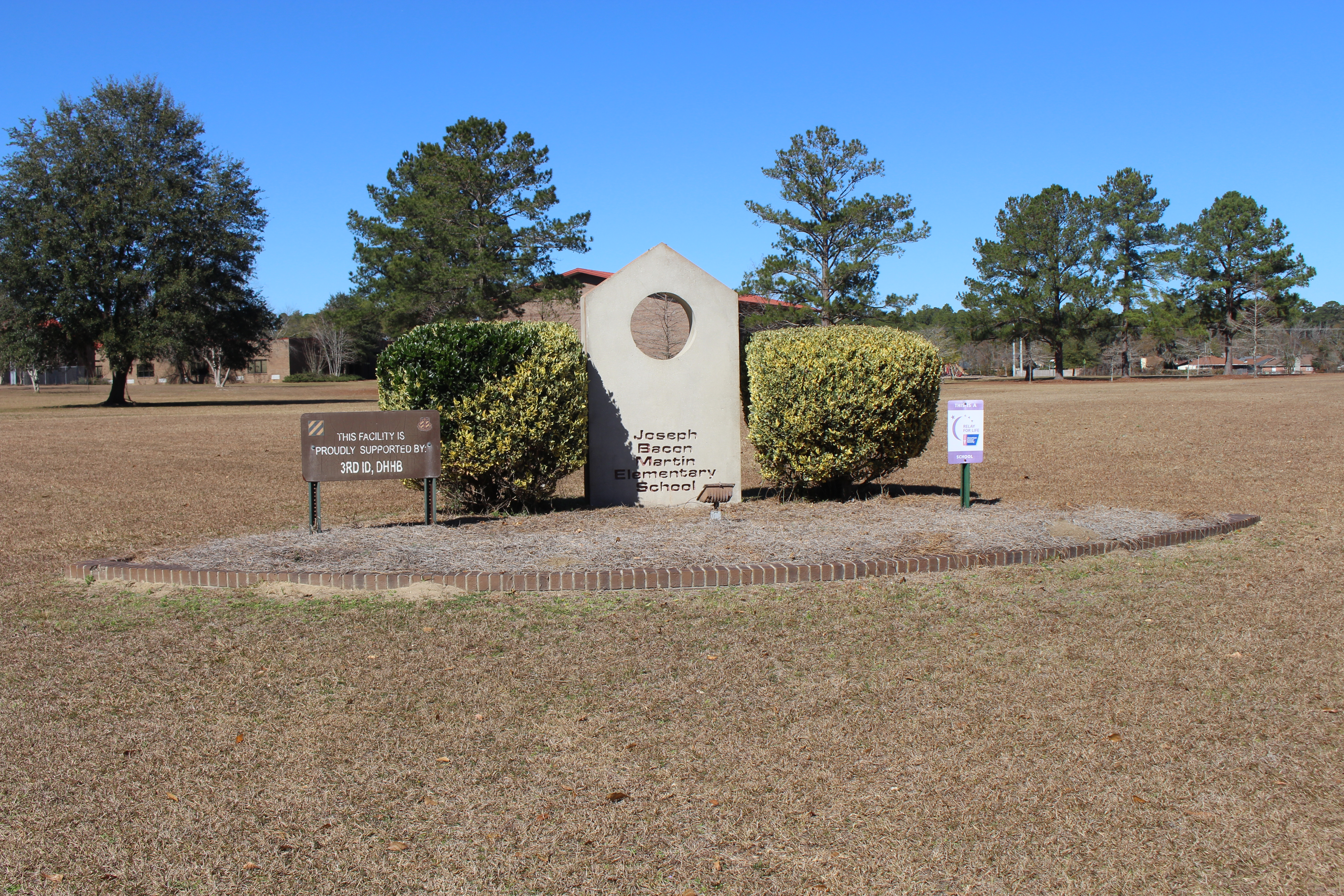
Joseph Bacon Martin Elementary School

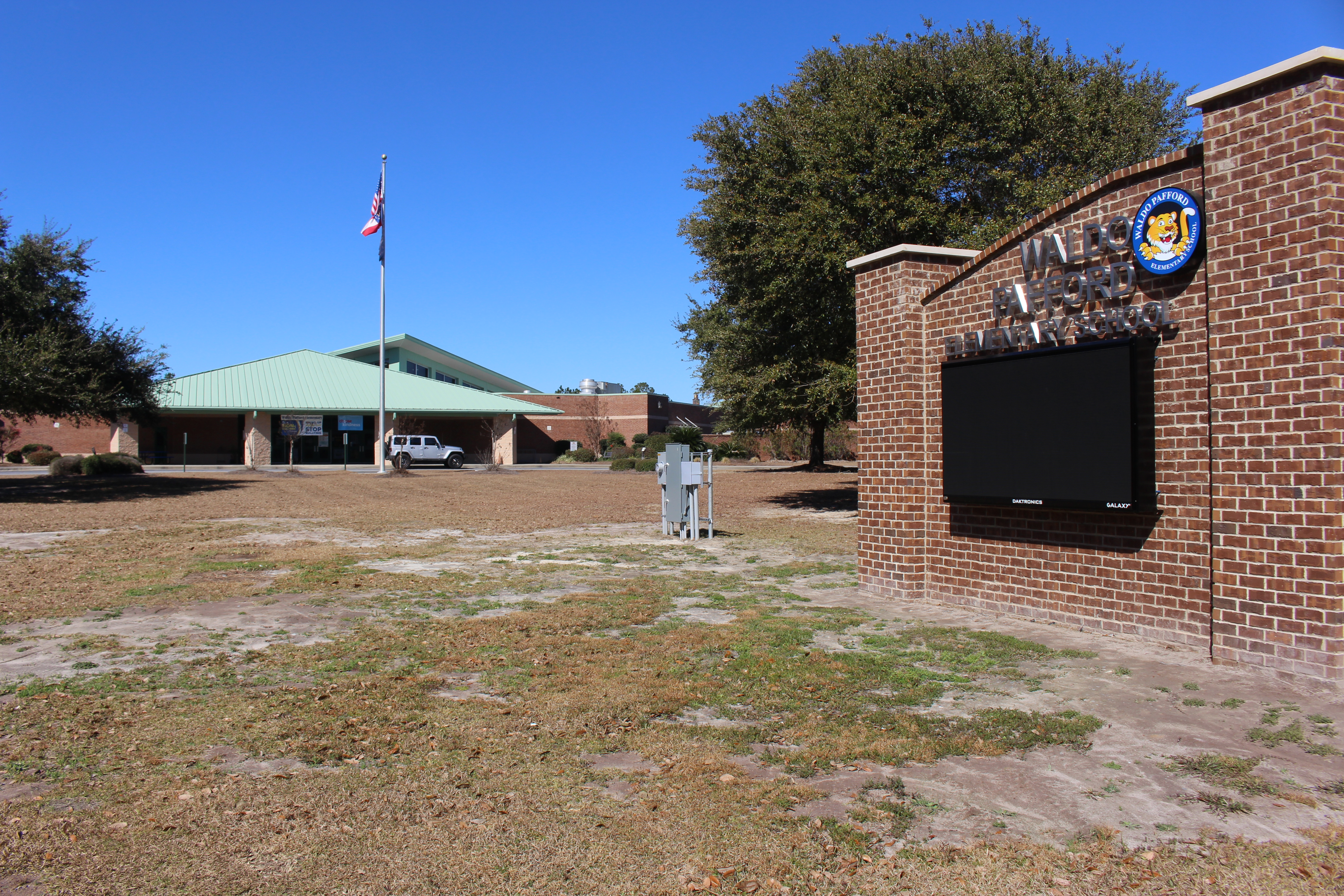
Waldo Pafford Elementary School

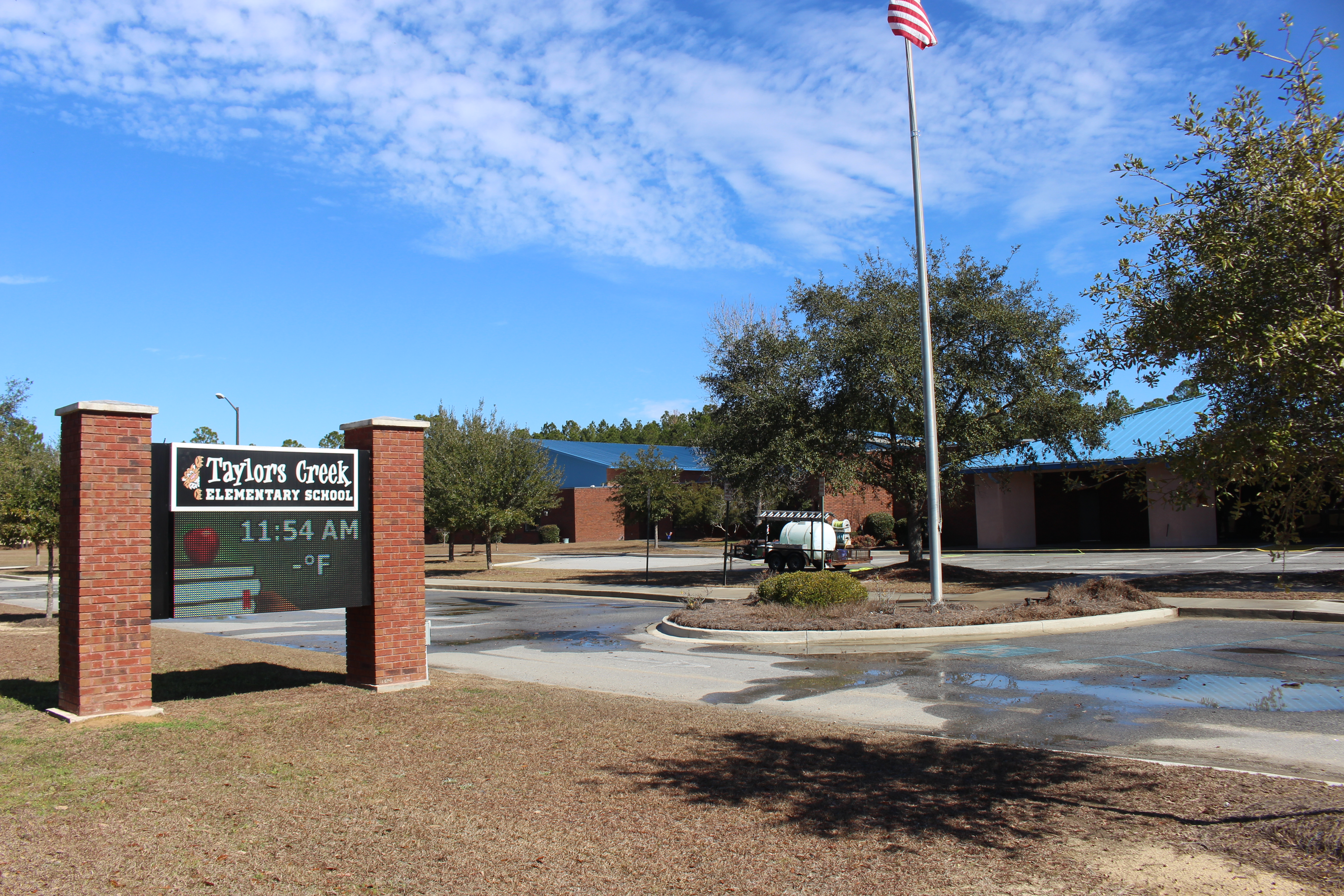
Taylors Creek Elementary School

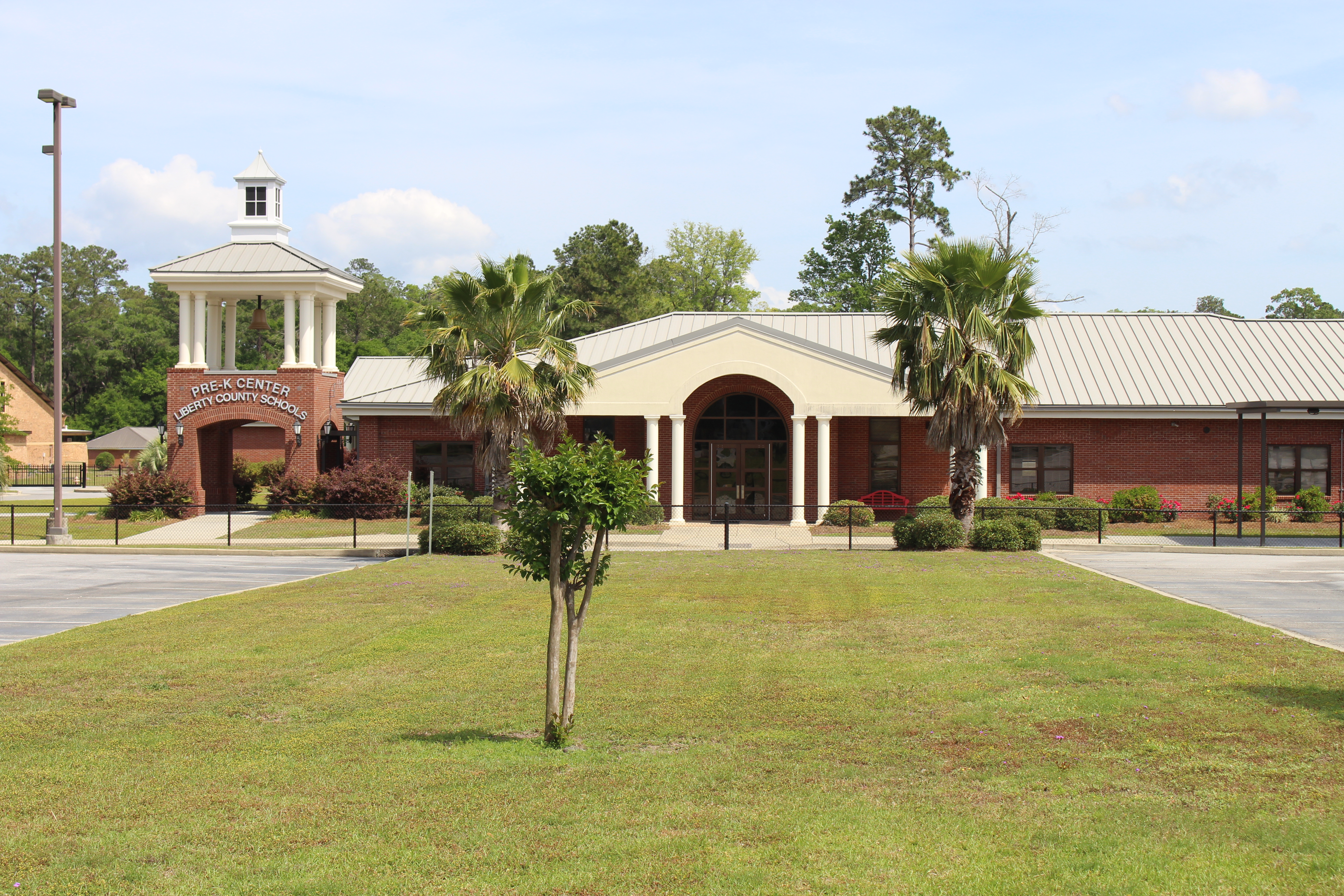
Pre-K Center
