= Hinesville metropolitan area =

Coordinates: 31°50′N 81°35′W

- Metropolitan statistical area
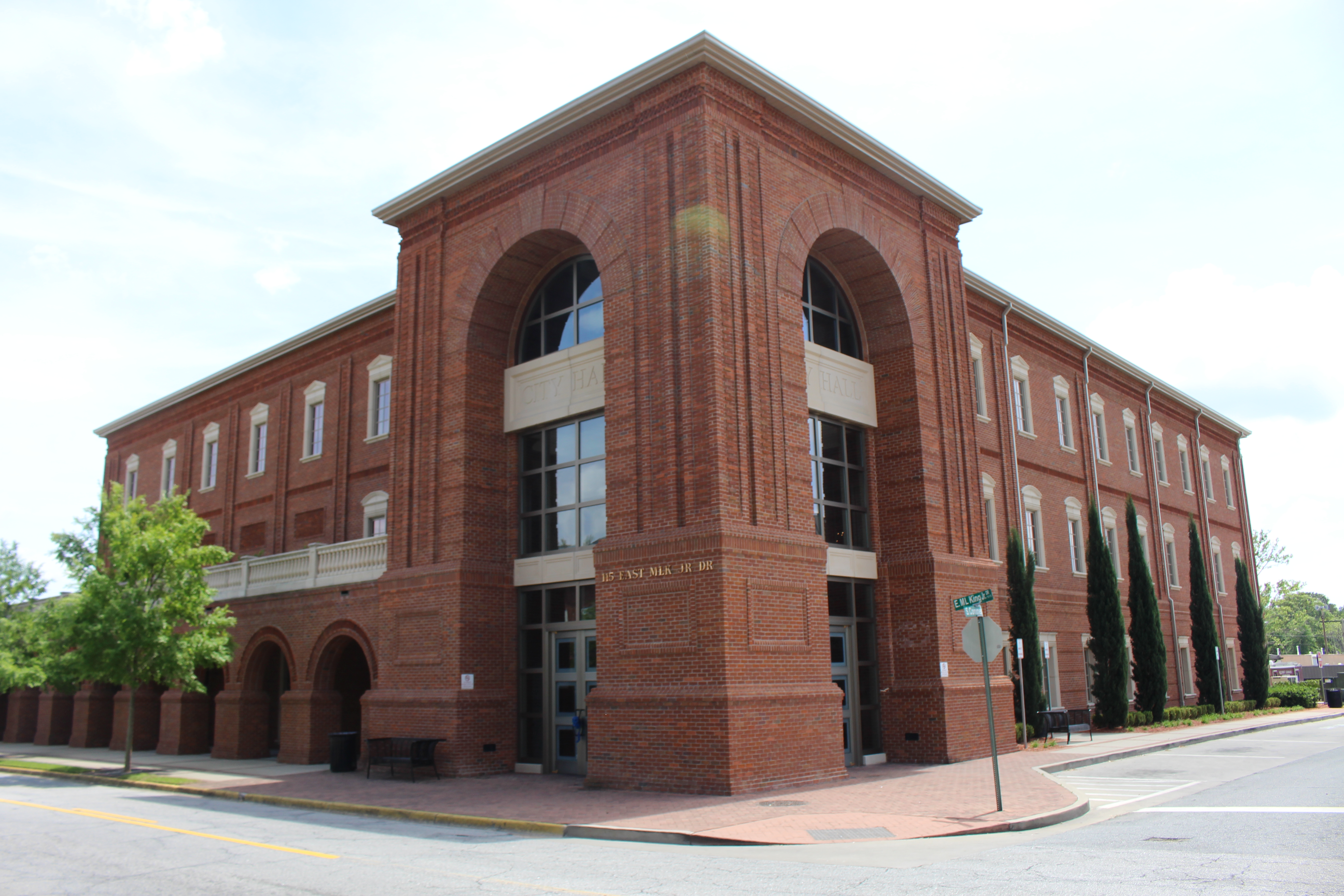
- Hinesville City Hall
Map of Savannah–Hinesville–Statesboro, GA CSA
City of Hinesville
Hinesville, GA MSA
Other Counties in the Savannah, GA CSA
- Country: United States
- State: Georgia
- Largest city: Hinesville

Area
  - Total: 916.9 sq mi (2,375 km^{2})

Population (2020)
  - Total: 81,424
  - Density: 94.9/sq mi (36.6/km^{2})
- Time zone: UTC−5 (EST)
  - Summer (DST): UTC−4 (EDT)

The Hinesville metropolitan area, officially the Hinesville metropolitan statistical area and previously the Hinesville–Ft. Stewart metropolitan statistical area, is defined by the U.S. Office of Management and Budget as a metropolitan statistical area consisting of two counties, Liberty and Long, in the U.S. state of Georgia. It is anchored by the city of Hinesville and encompasses all of Fort Stewart, one of the largest U.S. Army installations in the United States.

The Hinesville metropolitan statistical area is part of a larger trading area, the Savannah–Hinesville–Statesboro combined statistical area within the Coastal Georgia region. As of 2020, the metropolitan population was 81,424, with a 2022 census-estimated population of 86,378.

== Geography ==
Comprising Liberty and Long counties, Hinesville is one of the three main metropolitan areas within Coastal Georgia.

=== Communities ===
- Allenhurst
- Flemington
- Fort Stewart (census-designated place)
- Gumbranch
- Hinesville (principal city)
- Ludowici
- Midway
- Riceboro
- Walthourville

== Demographics ==
At the 2000 U.S. census, there were 71,914 people, 22,957 households, and 17,814 families residing in the MSA. At the 2020 census, there were 81,424 people residing in the MSA; in 2022, the U.S. Census Bureau estimated the MSA's population to have increased to 86,378.

In 2000, the racial makeup of the MSA was 49.76% White, 40.18% African American, 0.55% Native American, 1.59% Asian, 0.41% Pacific Islander, 4.36% from other races, and 3.15% from two or more races. Hispanic or Latinos of any race were 8.19% of the population. As of 2022's American Community Survey, its racial and ethnic makeup was 41% White, 35% Black, 2% Asian, 7% multiracial, and 13% Hispanic or Latino of any race.

In 2000, the median income for a household in the MSA was $32,059, and the median income for a family was $33,752. Males had a median income of $25,861 versus $19,749 for females. The per capita income for the MSA was $13,221. In 2022, its median household income was $62,795 with a per capita income of $28,762.

== See also ==
- Georgia statistical areas
- List of municipalities in Georgia (U.S. state)
