= Flemington, Georgia =

- City
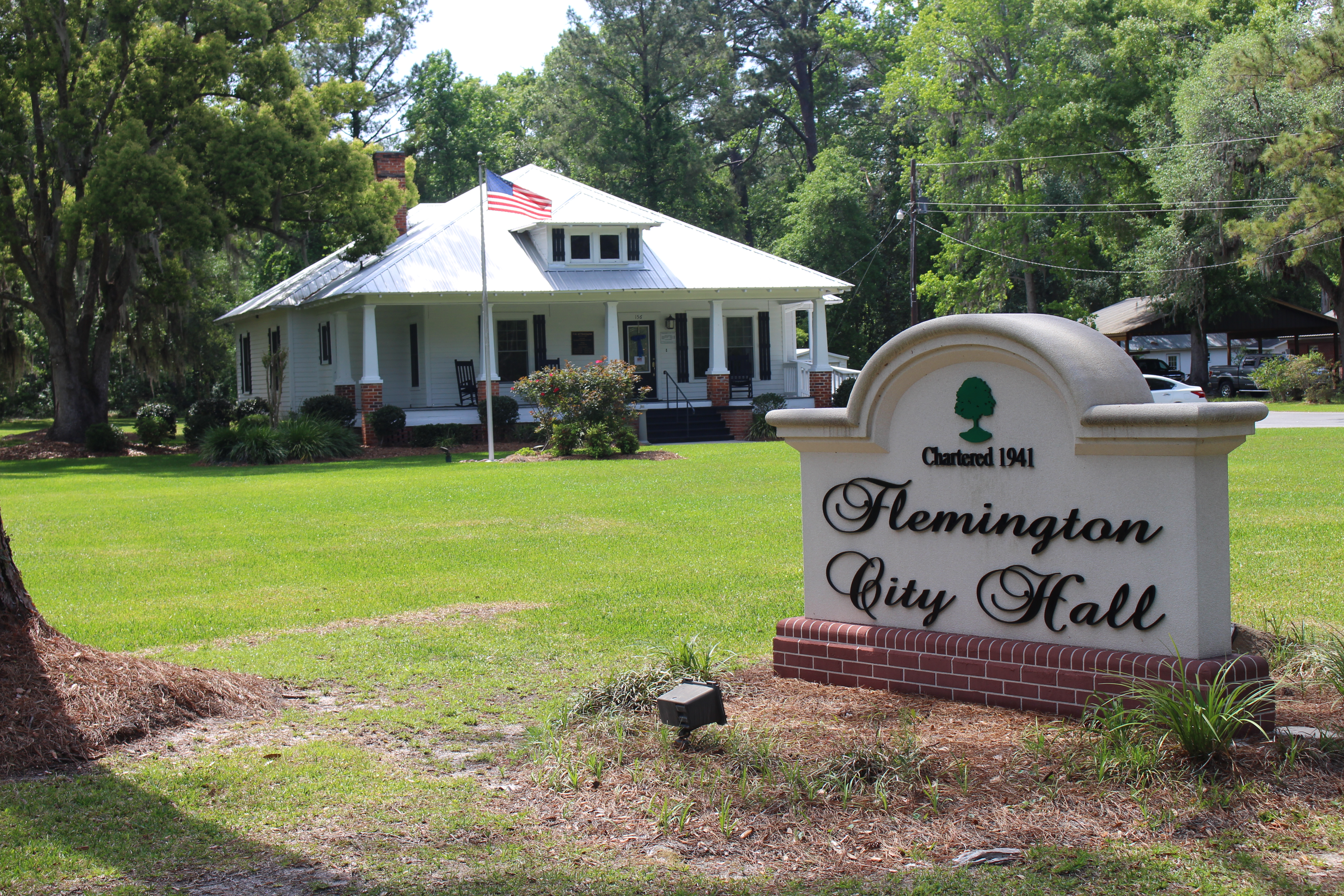
- Flemington City Hall

- Seal

- Location in Liberty County and the state of Georgia
- Coordinates: 31°51′23″N 81°33′40″W
- Country: United States
- State: Georgia
- County: Liberty

Government
  - Mayor: Paul Hawkins

Area
  - Total: 4.77 sq mi (12.35 km^{2})
  - Land: 4.76 sq mi (12.34 km^{2})
  - Water: 0 sq mi (0.00 km^{2})
- Elevation: 20 ft (6 m)

Population (2020)
  - Total: 825
  - Density: 173.1/sq mi (66.84/km^{2})
- Time zone: UTC-5 (Eastern (EST))
  - Summer (DST): UTC-4 (EDT)
- ZIP code: 31313
- Area code: 912
- FIPS code: 13-30088
- GNIS feature ID: 0355840
- Website: cityofflemington.org

Flemington is a city in Liberty County, Georgia, United States. It is a part of the Hinesville-Fort Stewart metropolitan statistical area. The population was 825 in 2020.

== History ==
A post office called Flemington was established in 1889, and remained in operation until 1966. The community was named after William Fleming, a pioneer settler. The Georgia General Assembly incorporated Flemington in 1941.

== Geography ==
Flemington is located in central Liberty County at 31°51′23″N 81°33′40″W. It is bordered to the west by Hinesville, the county seat. U.S. Route 84 passes through the center of Flemington, leading west into Hinesville and east 12 miles (19 km) to Interstate 95 on the east side of Midway.

According to the United States Census Bureau, Flemington has a total area of 4.7 square miles (12.3 km^{2}), of which 0.86 acres (3,485 m^{2}), or 0.03%, are water.

== Demographics ==
Historical population
Census	Pop.	Note	%±
1950	90		—
1960	149		65.6%
1970	265		77.9%
1980	440		66.0%
1990	279		−36.6%
2000	369		32.3%
2010	743		101.4%
2020	825		11.0%
U.S. Decennial Census

In 2020, its population was 825.

== Education ==
The Liberty County School District operates public schools that serve Flemington.
