= Gumbranch, Georgia =

Gumbranch, Georgia Gum Branch
- City
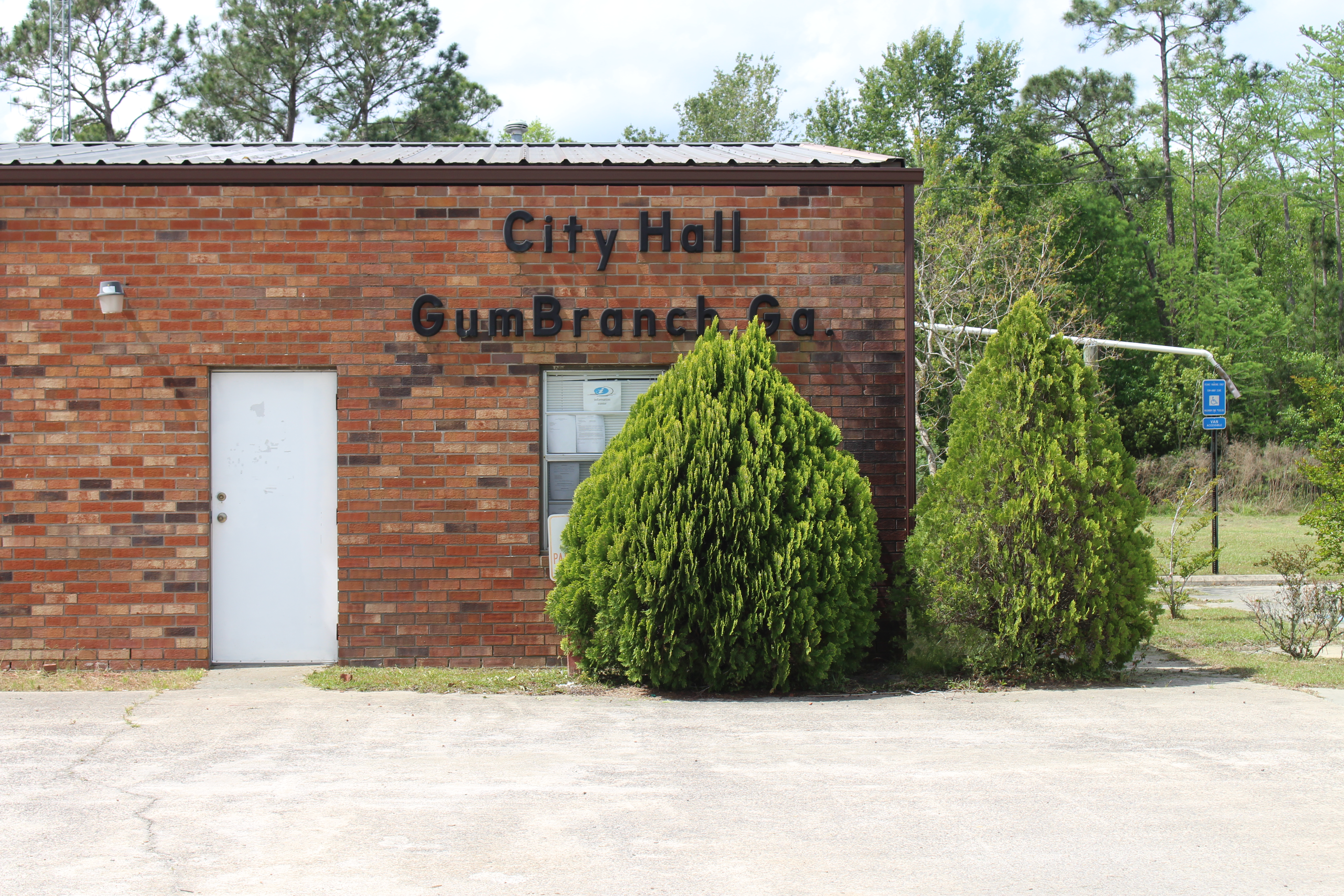
- City Hall

- Location in Liberty County and the state of Georgia

- Location in the United States
- Coordinates: 31°50′20″N 81°41′4″W
- Country: United States
- State: Georgia
- County: Liberty

Area
  - Total: 0.81 sq mi (2.09 km^{2})
  - Land: 0.81 sq mi (2.09 km^{2})
  - Water: 0 sq mi (0.00 km^{2})
- Elevation: 79 ft (24 m)

Population (2020)
  - Total: 235
  - Density: 291.1/sq mi (112.41/km^{2})
- Time zone: UTC-5 (Eastern (EST))
  - Summer (DST): UTC-4 (EDT)
- ZIP code: 31313
- Area code: 912
- FIPS code: 13-35800
- GNIS feature ID: 0331886

Gumbranch, alternatively spelled Gum Branch, is a city in Liberty County, Georgia, United States. It is a part of the Hinesville-Fort Stewart metropolitan statistical area. The population was 264 at the 2010 census, and 235 in 2020.

== History ==
Gumbranch was incorporated on January 1, 1979. While officially incorporated as "Gumbranch", the alternative spelling "Gum Branch" is often used, such as with the nearby Gum Branch Park and Gum Branch Baptist Church.

== Geography ==
Gumbranch is located in western Liberty County at 31°50′20″N 81°41′4″W (31.838765, -81.684384). Georgia State Route 196 passes through the community, leading east 7 miles (11 km) to Hinesville, the county seat, and northwest 19 miles (31 km) to Glennville.

According to the United States Census Bureau, Gumbranch has a total area of 0.81 square miles (2.1 km^{2}), all of it recorded as land.

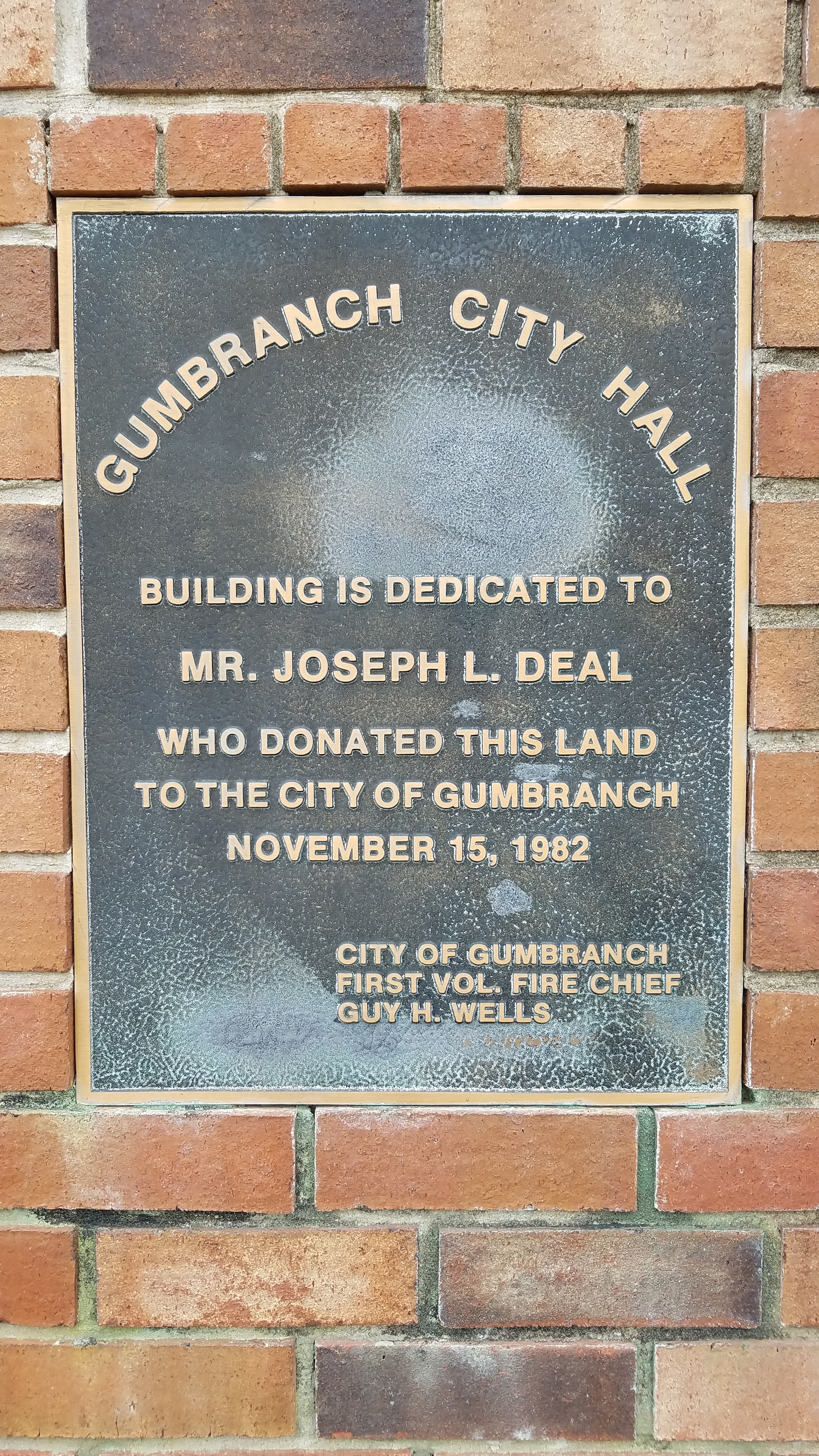
Gumbranch City Hall plaque

== Demographics ==
Historical population
Census	Pop.	Note	%±
1980	272		—
1990	291		7.0%
2000	273		−6.2%
2010	264		−3.3%
2020	235		−11.0%
U.S. Decennial Census

In 2020, its population was 235.

== Government and infrastructure ==
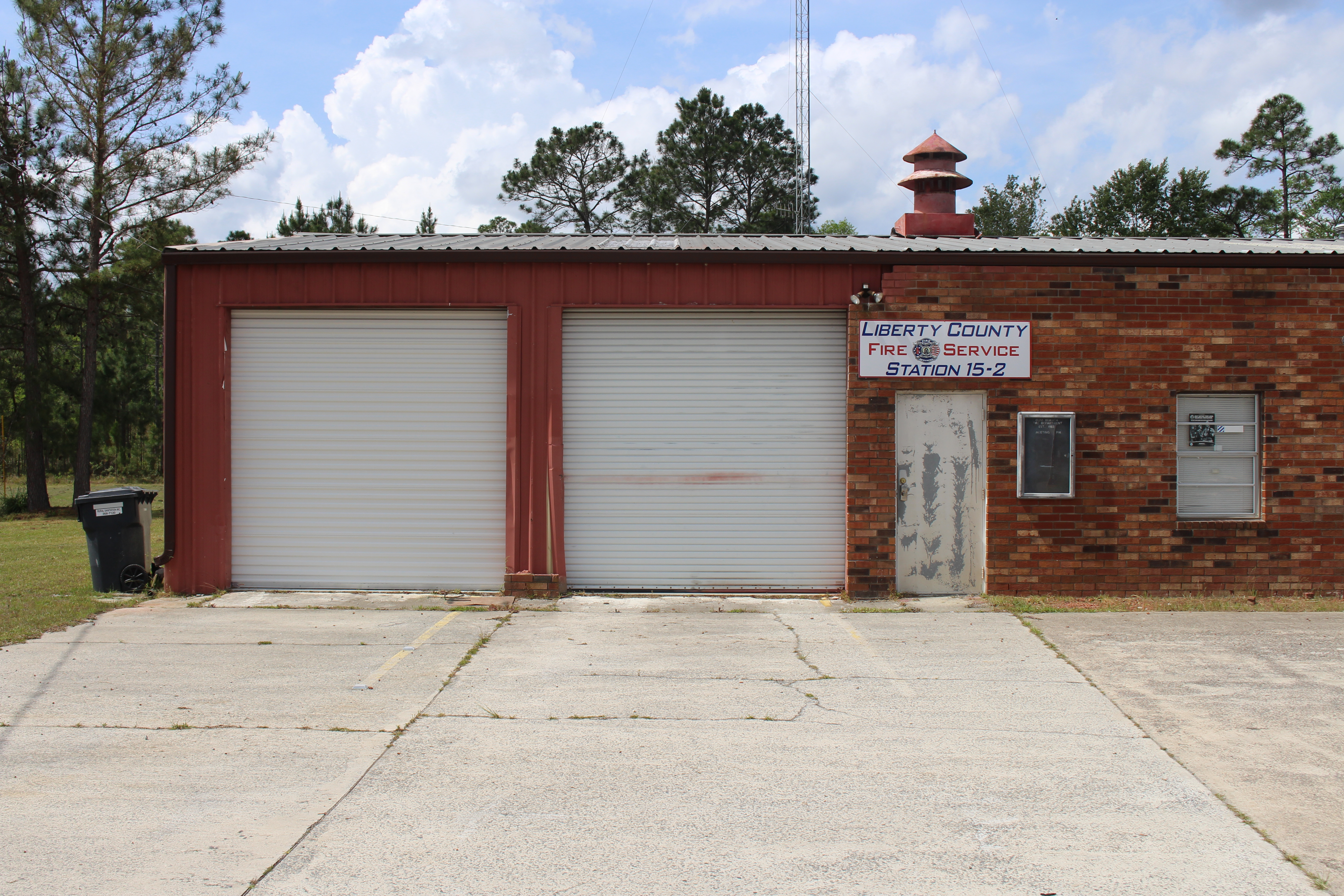
Liberty County Fire Service Station 15-2

Liberty County Fire Services operates Station 15 Gumbranch.

== Education ==
The Liberty County School District operates public schools that serve Gumbranch.
