= Liberty County High School (Georgia) =

Location
- 3216 East Oglethorpe Highway; Hinesville, Georgia 31313-1306; United States; 31.851372°N 81.583145°W

Information
- Type: Public secondary
- School district: Liberty County School District
- Principal: Warnella Wilder
- Teaching staff: 67.40 FTE
- Grades: 9–12
- Enrollment: 1,163 (2023–2024)
- Student to teacher ratio: 17.26
- Campus: Suburban
- Colors: Black and gold
- Mascot: Panther
- Accreditation: Southern Association of Colleges and Schools
- Telephone: (912) 876–4316
- Website: https://www.libertycountyhs.org/
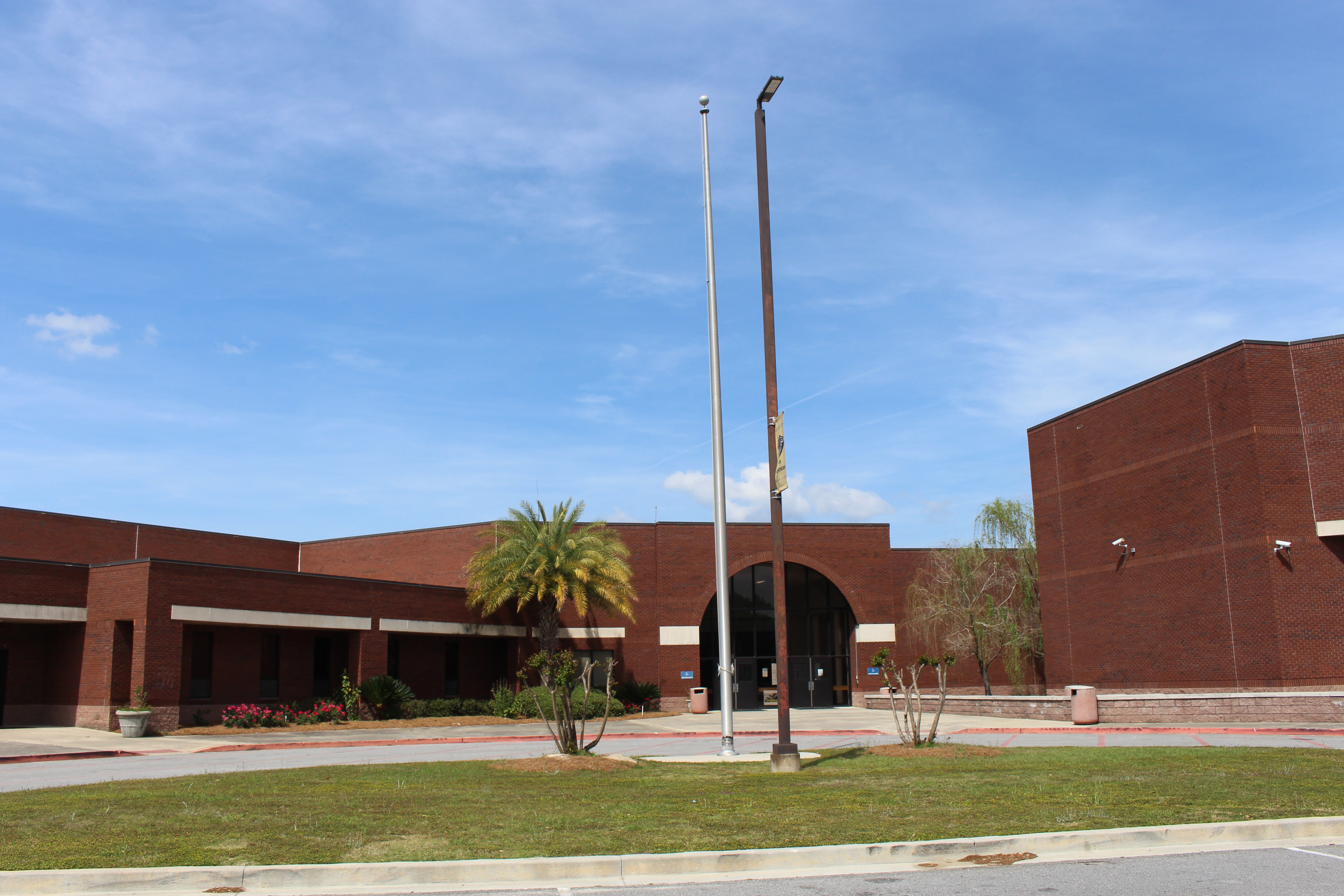

Liberty County High School is a public high school located in Hinesville, Georgia, United States. The school is part of the Liberty County School District, which serves Liberty County.

During the era of segregation the school competed in the Georgia Interscholastic Association.

"Liberty County High School, in cooperation with students, parents, and community members will strive to provide all students with the intellectual, cultural, and technological resources and opportunities necessary to become contributing members of our democratic society."

== Notable alumni ==
- Rion Brown, basketball player
- Raekwon McMillan (born 1995), NFL football player
- Jordan McRae (born 1991), basketball player for Hapoel Tel Aviv of the Israeli Basketball Premier League
- Davion Mitchell (born 1998), NBA basketball player
- Tony Royster Jr. (born 1984), drummer
- Bryan Sears (born 1982), sprinter
