= Riceboro, Georgia =

City in the United States

- City
- Logo

- Location in Liberty County and the state of Georgia
- Coordinates: 31°44′7″N 81°26′25″W
- Country: United States
- State: Georgia
- County: Liberty

Government
  - Mayor: Chris Stacy

Area
  - Total: 11.37 sq mi (29.46 km^{2})
  - Land: 11.12 sq mi (28.80 km^{2})
  - Water: 0.25 sq mi (0.66 km^{2})
- Elevation: 13 ft (4 m)

Population (2020)
  - Total: 615
  - Density: 55.3/sq mi (21.35/km^{2})
- Time zone: UTC-5 (Eastern (EST))
  - Summer (DST): UTC-4 (EDT)
- ZIP code: 31323
- Area code: 912
- FIPS code: 13-64960
- GNIS feature ID: 0356495
- Website: www.cityofriceboro.org

Riceboro is a city in Liberty County, Georgia, United States. As of the 2020 census, Riceboro had a population of 615. It is a part of the Hinesville-Fort Stewart metropolitan statistical area.

== History ==
The community was named for the early rice industry in the area. Riceboro served as the second seat of Liberty County from 1789 until 1837.

The Georgia General Assembly first incorporated the place as the "Village of Riceborough" in 1819.

== Geography ==
Riceboro is located at 31°44′7″N 81°26′25″W (31.735411, -81.440240).

According to the United States Census Bureau, the city has a total area of 11.4 square miles (30 km^{2}), of which 11.1 square miles (29 km^{2}) is land and 0.3 square miles (0.78 km^{2}) (2.72%) is water.

== Demographics ==
Historical population
Census	Pop.	Note	%±
1930	233		—
1940	364		56.2%
1950	267		−26.6%
1960	259		−3.0%
1970	252		−2.7%
1980	216		−14.3%
1990	745		244.9%
2000	736		−1.2%
2010	809		9.9%
2020	615		−24.0%
U.S. Decennial Census

=== Racial and ethnic composition ===
Riceboro city, Georgia – Racial and ethnic composition Note: the US Census treats Hispanic/Latino as an ethnic category. This table excludes Latinos from the racial categories and assigns them to a separate category. Hispanics/Latinos may be of any race.
Race / Ethnicity (NH = Non-Hispanic)	Pop 2000	Pop 2010	Pop 2020	% 2000	% 2010	% 2020
White alone (NH)	75	48	86	10.19%	5.93%	13.98%
Black or African American alone (NH)	648	733	509	88.04%	90.61%	82.76%
Native American or Alaska Native alone (NH)	0	0	2	0.00%	0.00%	0.33%
Asian alone (NH)	0	1	3	0.00%	0.12%	0.49%
Native Hawaiian or Pacific Islander alone (NH)	0	1	0	0.00%	0.12%	0.00%
Other race alone (NH)	0	0	0	0.00%	0.00%	0.00%
Mixed race or Multiracial (NH)	6	13	9	0.82%	1.61%	1.46%
Hispanic or Latino (any race)	7	13	6	0.95%	1.61%	0.98%
Total	736	809	615	100.00%	100.00%	100.00%

=== 2020 census ===
As of the 2020 United States census, there were 615 people, 310 households, and 193 families residing in the city.

== Notable people ==
- DeLisha Milton-Jones, WNBA player and Olympic gold medalist, head coach at Old Dominion
- Richard LeCounte III, (b 1998) NFL safety for the Cleveland Browns and at the University of Georgia

== See also ==
List of county seats in Georgia (U.S. state)

A famous case about adoption which took place in Riceboro: O’Neal v. Wilkes
