= Hinesville, Georgia =

Hinesville
- City
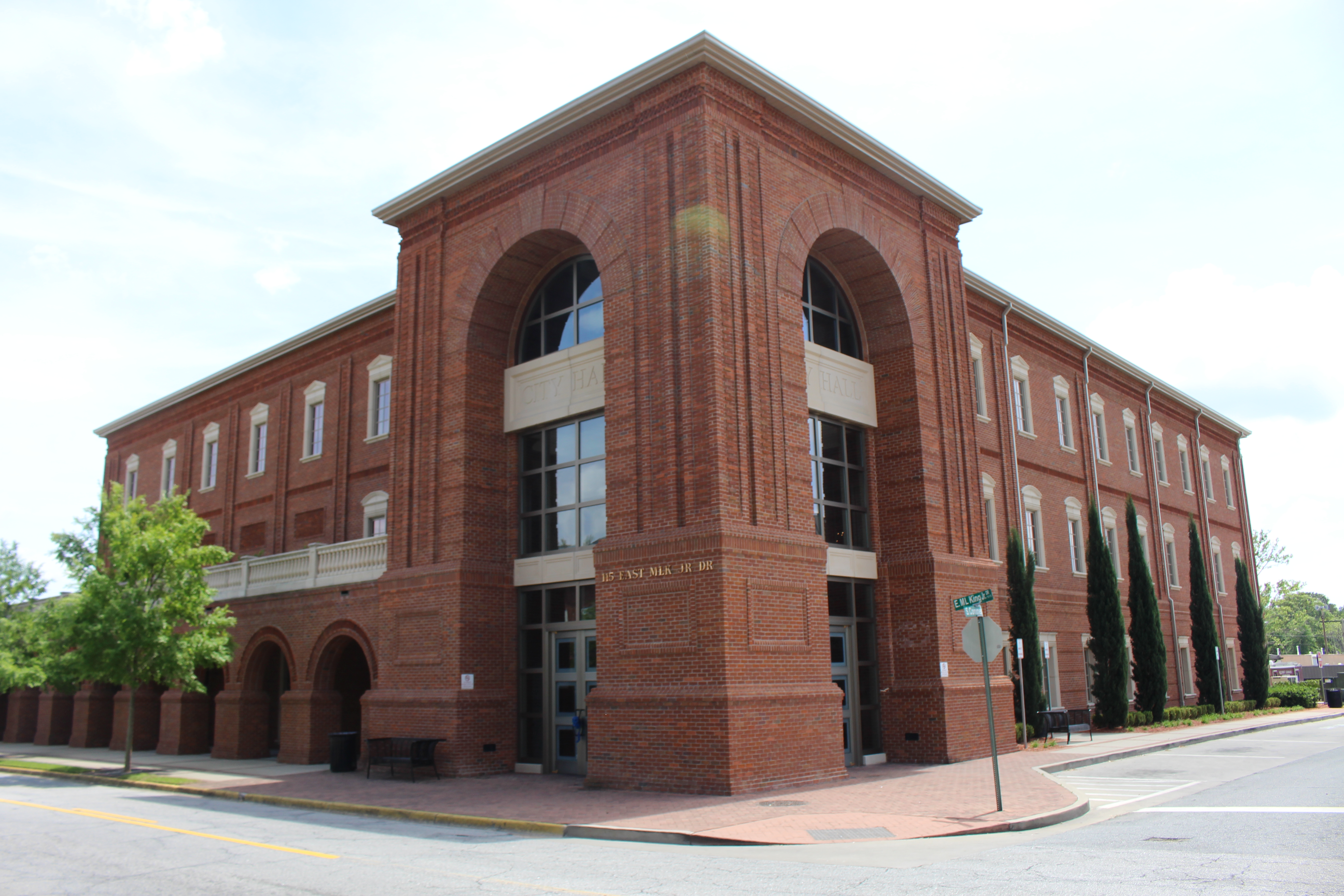
- Hinesville city hall

- Seal Logo
- Motto: "Home for a day or a lifetime"
- Location in Liberty County and the state of Georgia

- Location in the United States
- Coordinates: 31°50′48″N 81°35′47″W
- Country: United States
- State: Georgia
- County: Liberty

Government
  - Mayor: Karl A. Riles
  - City Manager: Kimberly Ryon (Interim)

Area
  - City: 18.38 sq mi (47.61 km^{2})
  - Land: 18.31 sq mi (47.42 km^{2})
  - Water: 0.073 sq mi (0.19 km^{2})
- Elevation: 75 ft (23 m)

Population (2020)
  - City: 34,891
  - Density: 1,905.7/sq mi (735.78/km^{2})
  - Metro: 77,917
- Time zone: UTC-5 (Eastern (EST))
  - Summer (DST): UTC-4 (EDT)
- ZIP Code: 31310, 31313
- Area code: 912
- FIPS code: 13-38964
- GNIS feature ID: 0331992
- Website: www.cityofhinesville.org

Hinesville is a city and the county seat of Liberty County, Georgia, United States. It is located on the Atlantic coastal plain. It had a population of 34,891 at the 2020 U.S. census. It is the principal city of the Hinesville metropolitan area, which comprises all of Liberty County, including the Fort Stewart army installation, plus neighboring Long County.

== History ==
Hinesville was founded in 1837. That same year, the seat of Liberty County was transferred to Hinesville from Riceboro. It was incorporated as a city in 1916. The city is named for Charlton Hines, a state senator.

A 2017 report by Business Insider listed Hinesville as the most boring city in Georgia, noting that there were only 25 full-service restaurants, four bars, 13 hotels, and no museums in the Hinesville metropolitan area.

== Geography ==
Hinesville is located west of the center of Liberty County, on the south side of Fort Stewart, the largest U.S. Army installation by area in the eastern United States. The city is bordered to the east by Flemington and to the south by Allenhurst and Walthourville. To the southwest the city limits extend to the Long County line.

U.S. Route 84 passes through the city, leading east 15 miles (24 km) to Interstate 95 near Midway and southwest 14 miles (23 km) to U.S. Route 301 at Ludowici. Hinesville is the second largest city on US 84 in Georgia after Valdosta. Savannah is 39 miles (63 km) northeast of Hinesville, and Brunswick is 55 miles (89 km) to the south.

According to the United States Census Bureau, the city has an area of 18.2 square miles (47.2 km^{2}), of which 0.1 square miles (0.2 km^{2}), or 0.40%, are water. Most of Hinesville drains east via Peacock Creek to the tidal North Newport River, while the west side of the city drains north via Mill Creek, part of the Canoochee River watershed flowing east to the tidal Ogeechee River.

== Demographics ==
Historical population
Census	Pop.	Note	%±
1880	162		—
1910	174		—
1920	315		81.0%
1930	416		32.1%
1940	630		51.4%
1950	1,217		93.2%
1960	3,174		160.8%
1970	4,115		29.6%
1980	11,309		174.8%
1990	21,603		91.0%
2000	30,392		40.7%
2010	33,437		10.0%
2020	34,891		4.3%
2025 (est.)	36,674	▲	5.1%
U.S. Decennial Census; 2025

=== 2020 census ===
As of the 2020 census, Hinesville had a population of 34,891. There were 9,354 families in the city. The median age was 29.3 years. 27.9% of residents were under the age of 18 and 8.7% of residents were 65 years of age or older. For every 100 females there were 91.6 males, and for every 100 females age 18 and over there were 87.2 males age 18 and over.

99.9% of residents lived in urban areas, while 0.1% lived in rural areas.

There were 13,251 households in Hinesville, of which 39.4% had children under the age of 18 living in them. Of all households, 45.3% were married-couple households, 17.9% were households with a male householder and no spouse or partner present, and 31.4% were households with a female householder and no spouse or partner present. About 25.1% of all households were made up of individuals and 6.1% had someone living alone who was 65 years of age or older.

There were 14,815 housing units, of which 10.6% were vacant. The homeowner vacancy rate was 2.8% and the rental vacancy rate was 12.0%.

Racial composition as of the 2020 census
Race	Number	Percent
White	10,865	31.1%
Black or African American	17,404	49.9%
American Indian and Alaska Native	145	0.4%
Asian	905	2.6%
Native Hawaiian and Other Pacific Islander	341	1.0%
Some other race	1,584	4.5%
Two or more races	3,647	10.5%
Hispanic or Latino (of any race)	4,568	13.1%

== Government and infrastructure ==
The U.S. Postal Service operates the Hinesville Post Office. The Liberty County Courthouse is in Hinesville and is listed on the National Register of Historic Places.

== Education ==
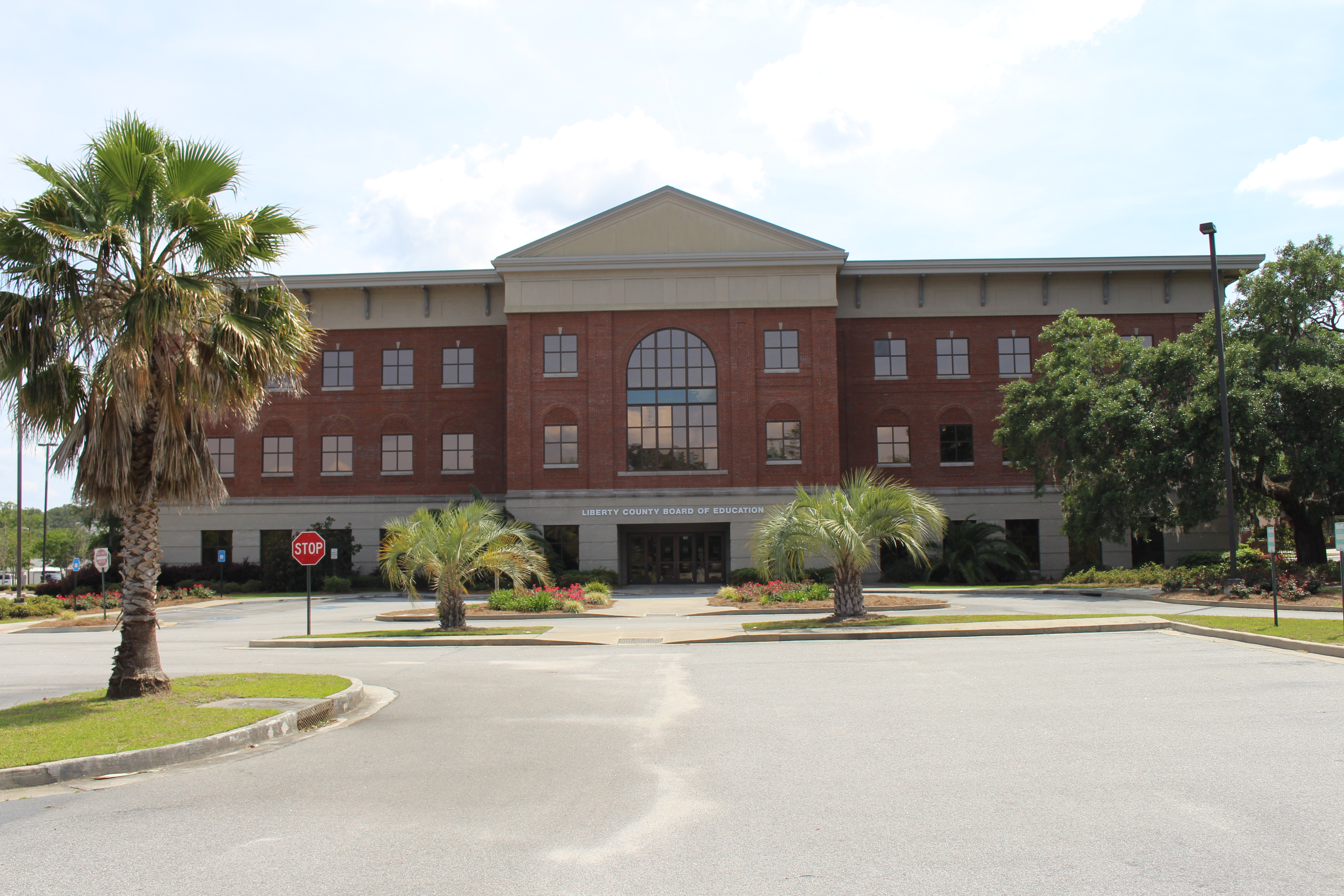
Liberty County School District headquarters

The Liberty County School District, based in Hinesville, holds pre-school to 12th grade, and consists of seven elementary schools, three middle schools, and two high schools. As of 2010 the district has 674 full-time teachers and over 11,274 students. As of 2014 the superintendent is Dr. Valya S. Lee. Liberty County High School and Bradwell Institute are the comprehensive high schools serving the community.

Georgia Southern University's Liberty campus is in the community.

Live Oak Public Libraries operates the Hinesville Library.

== Media ==
=== Newspaper ===
- Coastal Courier

== Gallery ==
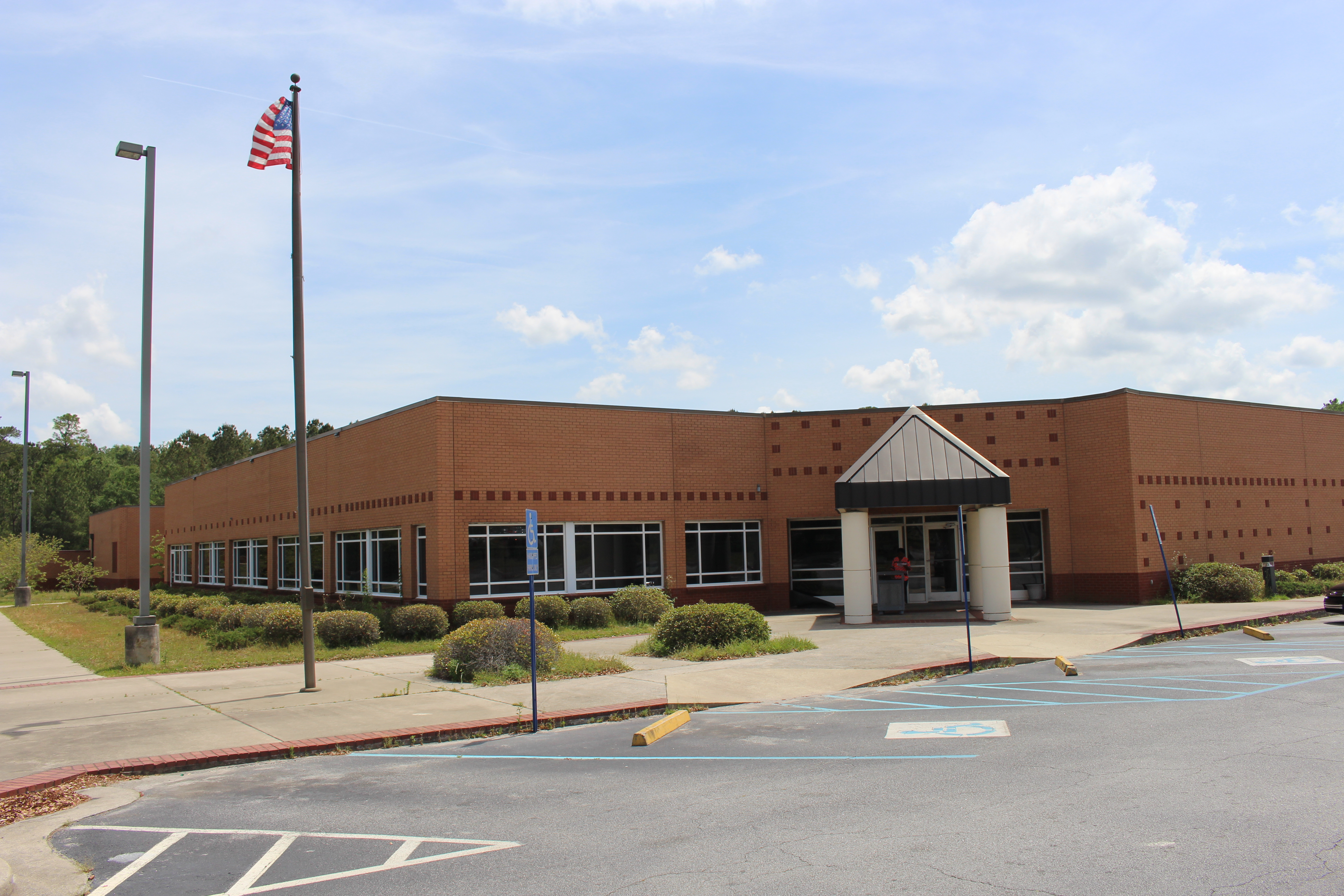
Hinesville Post Office

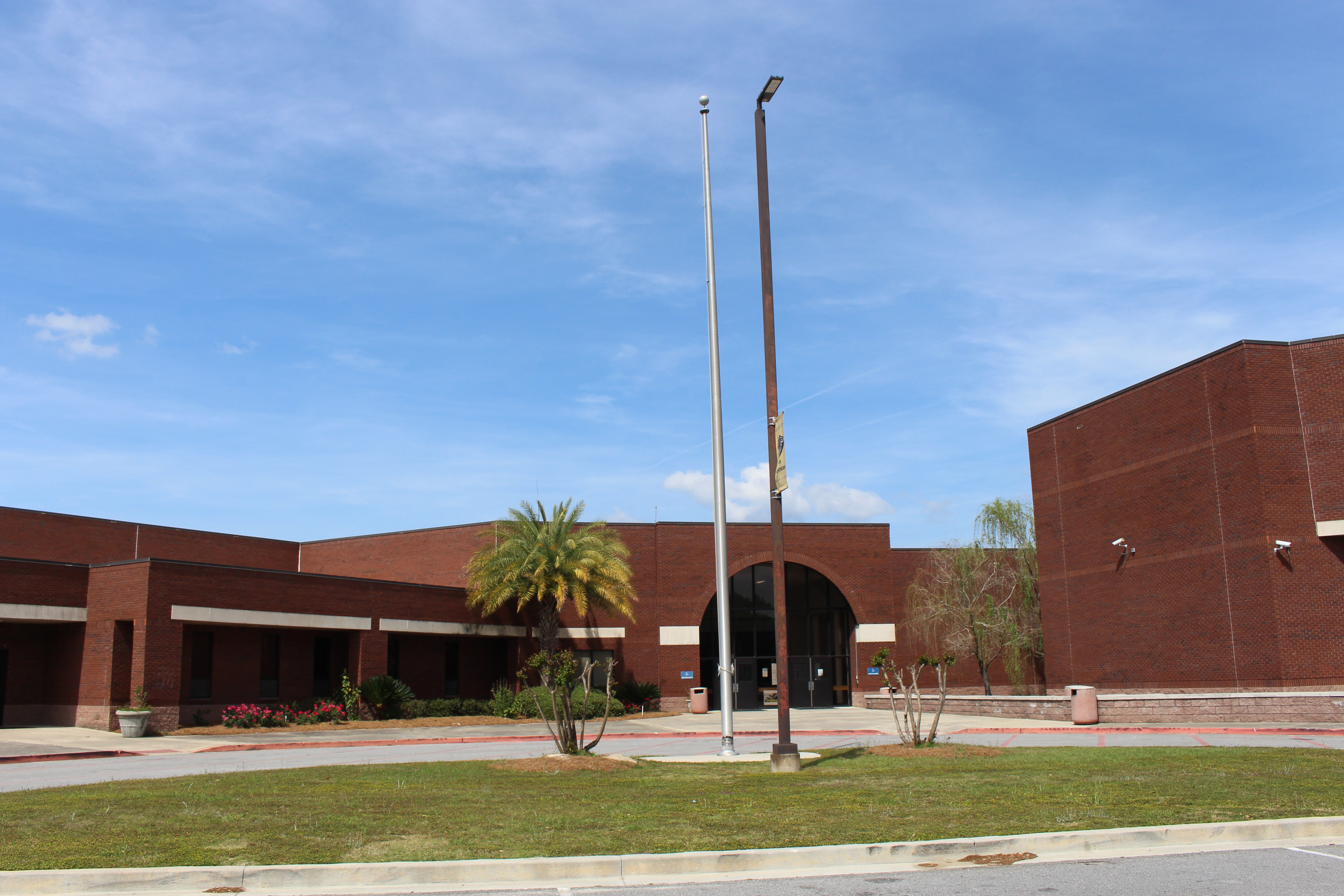
Liberty County High School

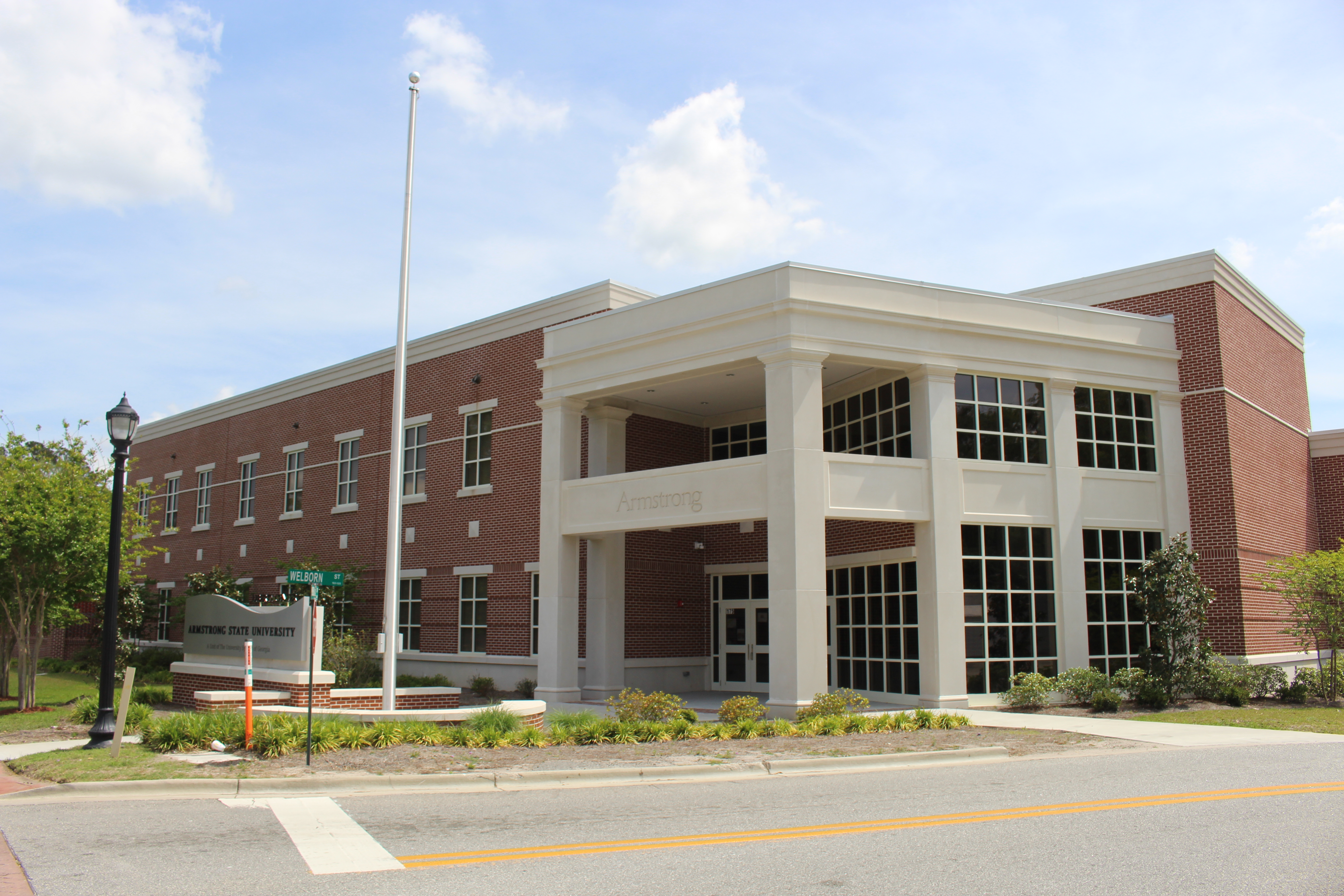
Georgia Southern University Hinesville Campus

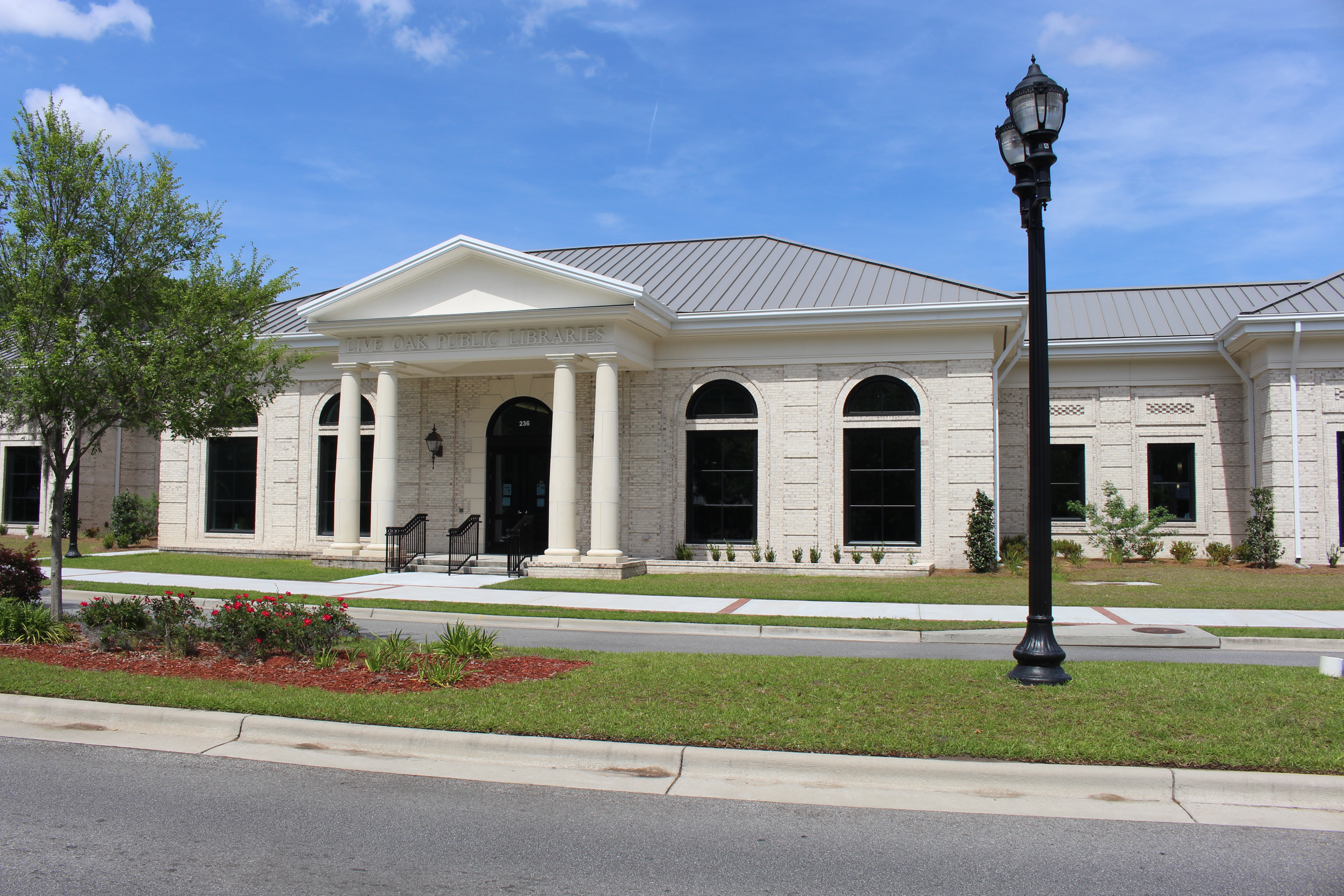
Live Oak Public Libraries

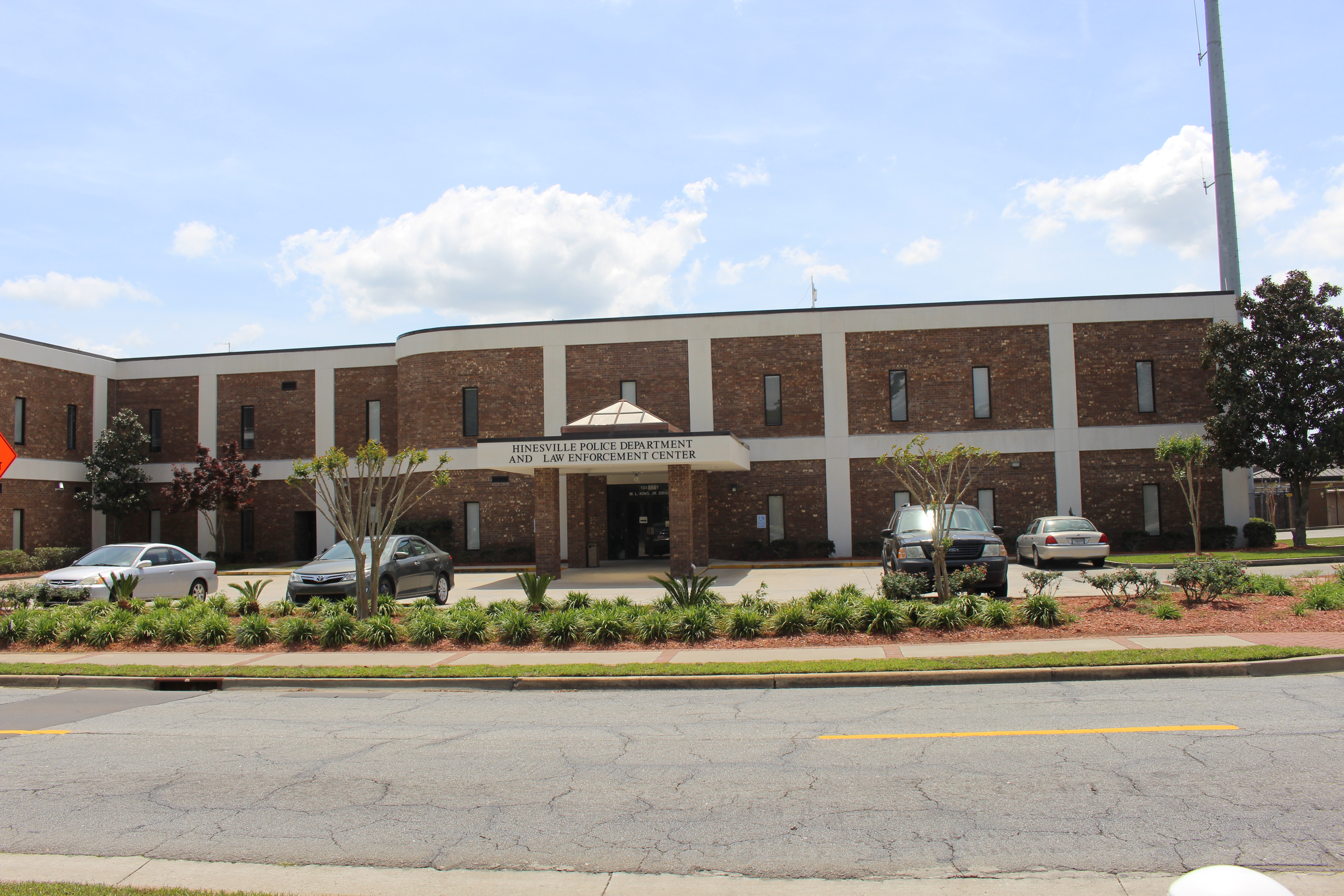
Hinesville Police Department and Law Enforcement Center

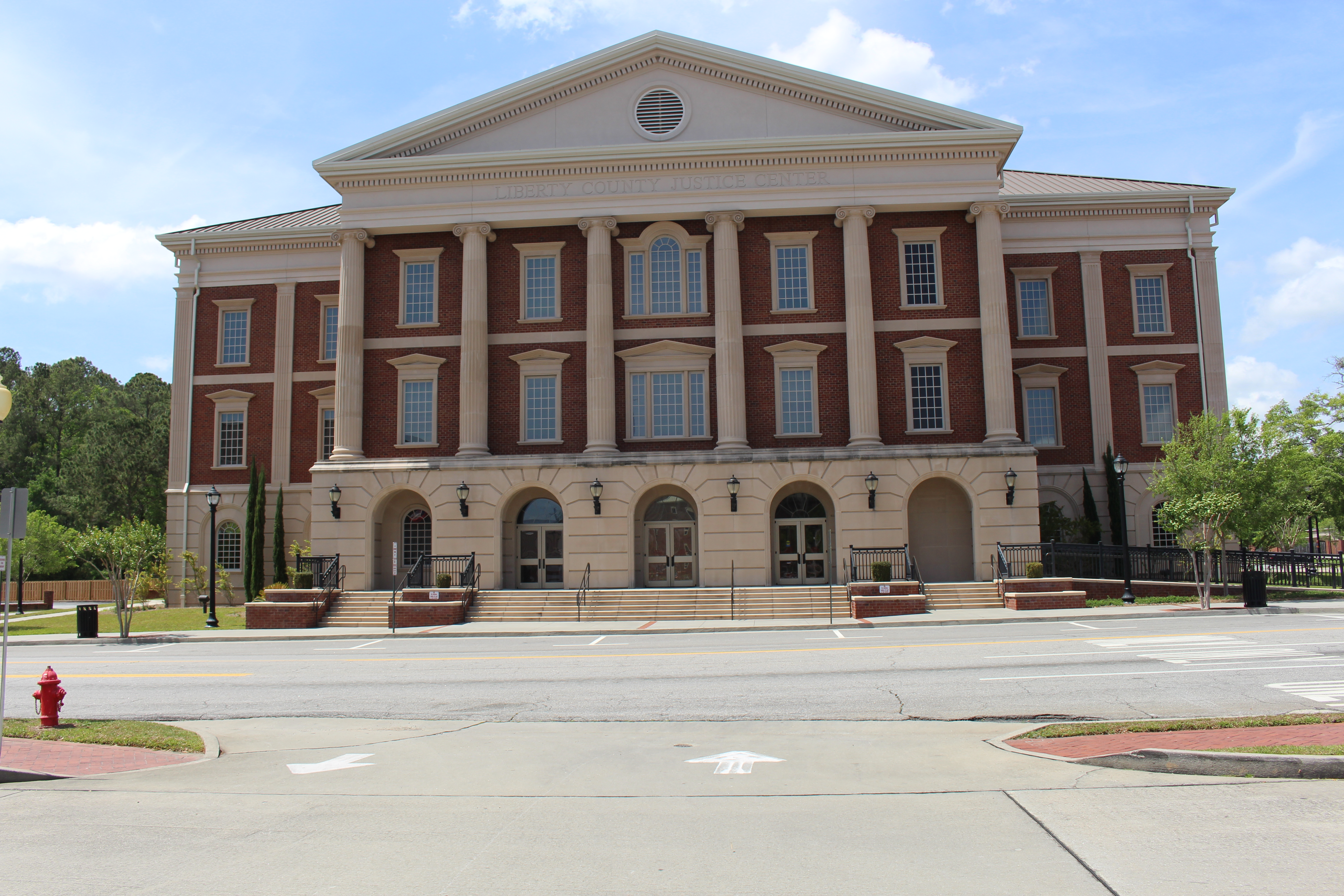
Liberty County Justice Center

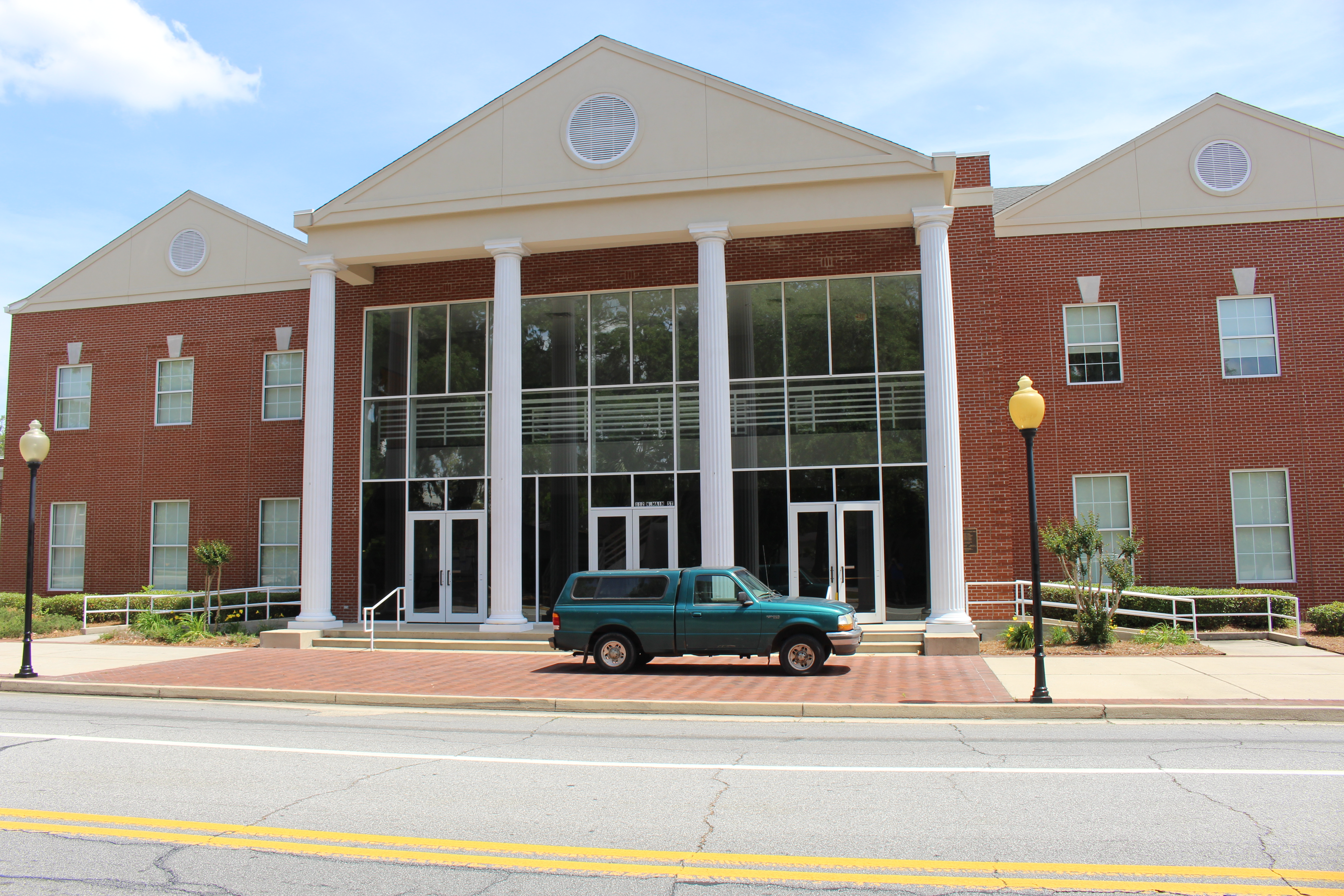
Liberty County Courthouse Annex

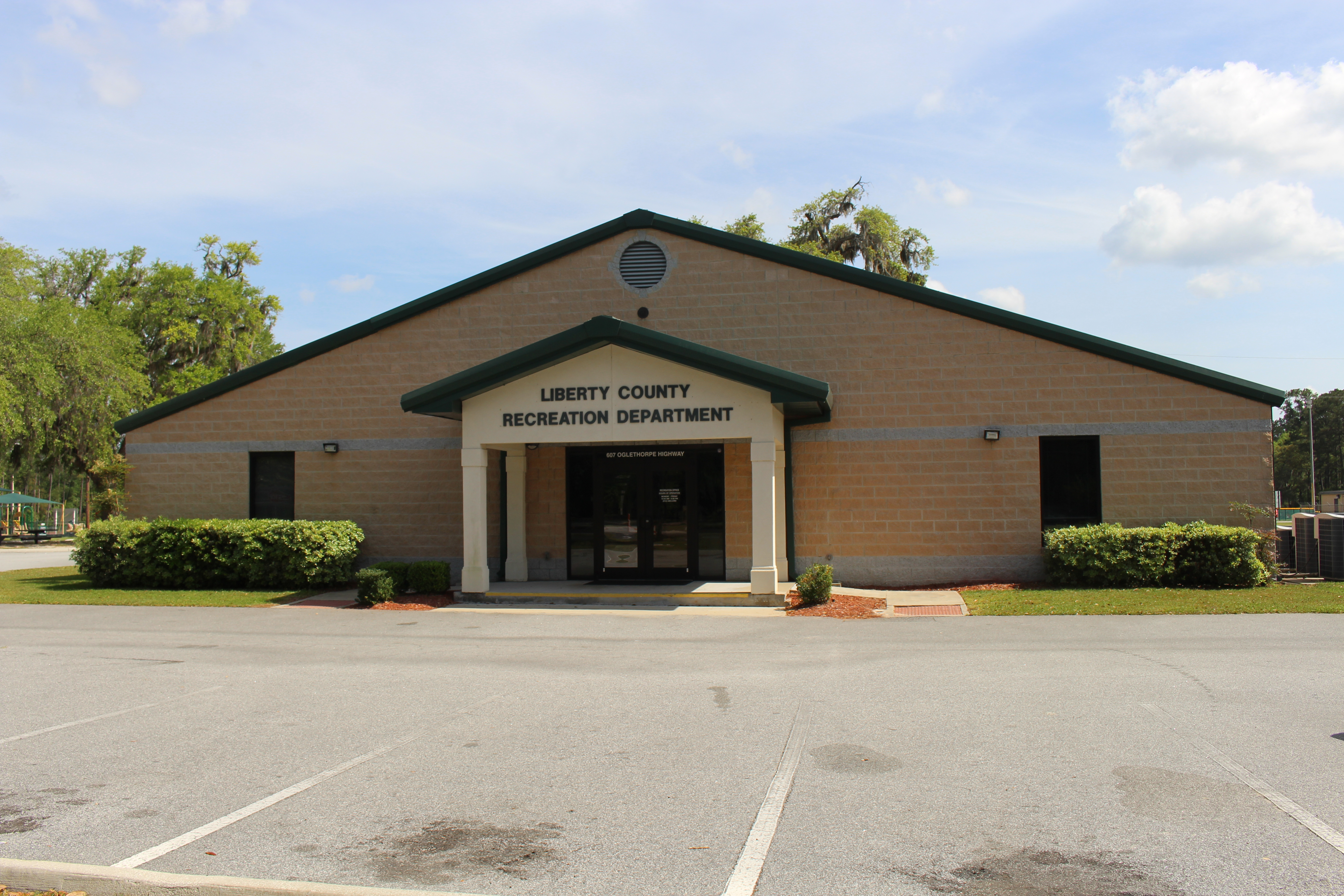
Liberty County Recreation Department

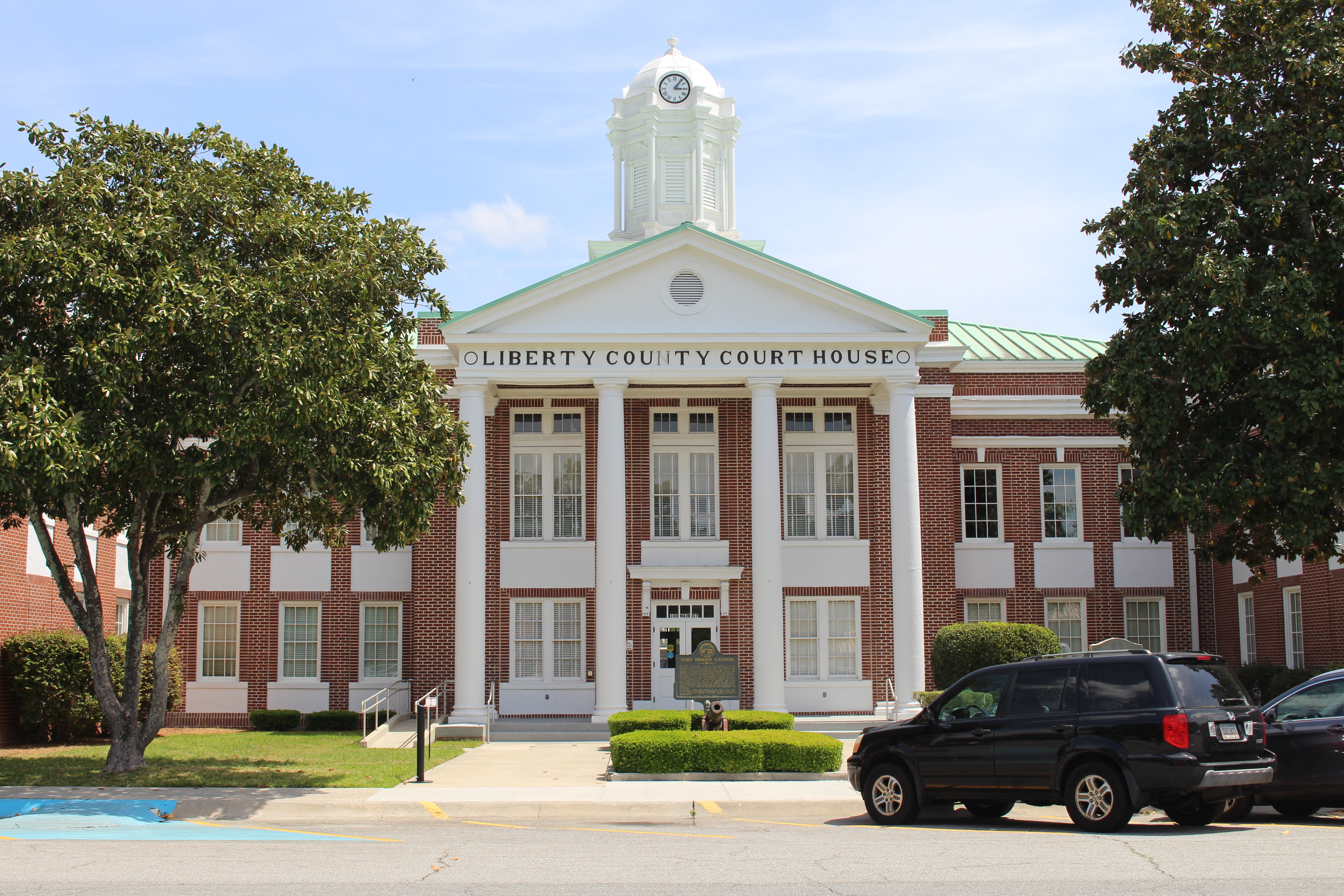
Liberty County Courthouse

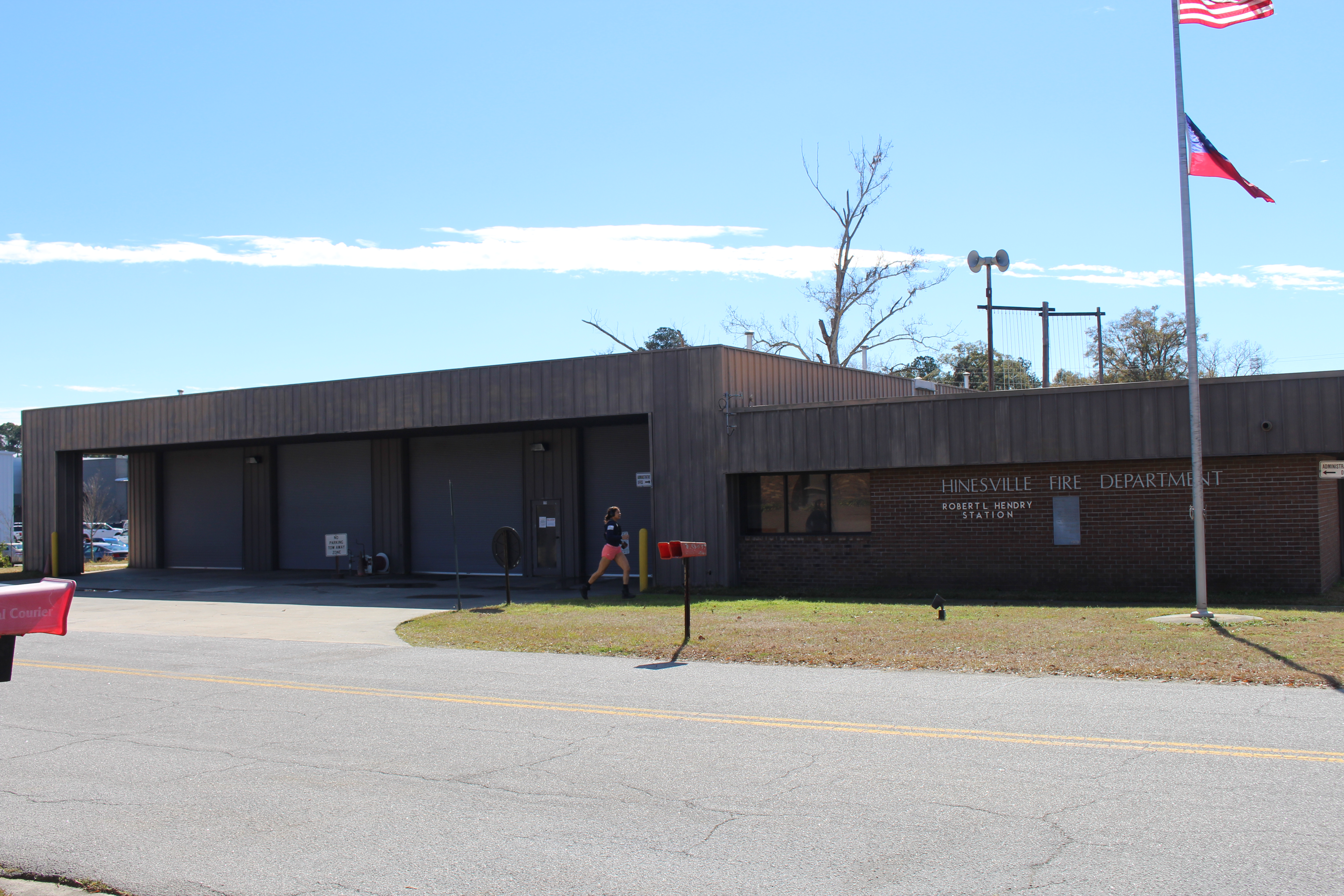
Fire Department
