= Allenhurst, Georgia =

- City
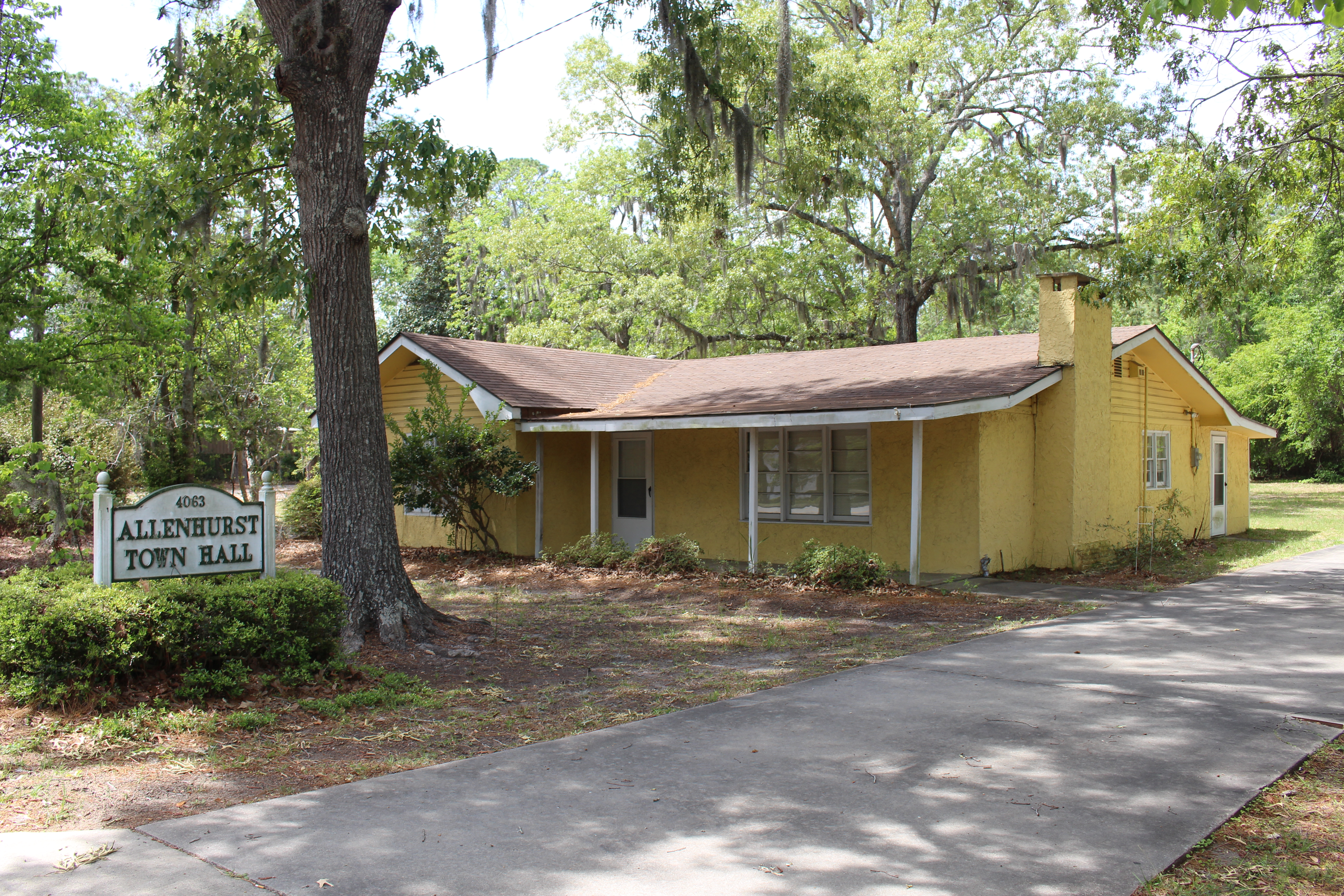
- Allenhurst Town Hall

- Location in Liberty County and the state of Georgia
- Coordinates: 31°46′53″N 81°36′30″W
- Country: United States
- State: Georgia
- County: Liberty

Area
  - Total: 1.14 sq mi (2.94 km^{2})
  - Land: 1.09 sq mi (2.83 km^{2})
  - Water: 0.042 sq mi (0.11 km^{2})
- Elevation: 59 ft (18 m)

Population (2020)
  - Total: 816
  - Density: 747.6/sq mi (288.64/km^{2})
- Time zone: UTC−5 (Eastern (EST))
  - Summer (DST): UTC−4 (EDT)
- ZIP Code: 31301
- Area code: 912
- FIPS code: 13-01472
- GNIS feature ID: 0310462
- Website: https://allenhurst.municipalimpact.com/

Allenhurst is a city in Liberty County, Georgia, United States. It is a part of the Hinesville metropolitan area. As of the 2020 census, the city had a population of 816.

== History ==
Allenhurst was platted in 1910 by B. H. Allen, the proprietor of a local sawmill. A post office has been in operation since 1909.

== Geography ==
Allenhurst is located at 31°46′53″N 81°36′30″W (31.781311, -81.608470).

According to the United States Census Bureau, the town has a total area of 1.1 square miles (2.8 km^{2}), of which 1.1 square miles (2.8 km^{2}) is land and 0.88% is water.

== Demographics ==
Historical population
Census	Pop.	Note	%±
1970	230		—
1980	606		163.5%
1990	594		−2.0%
2000	788		32.7%
2010	695		−11.8%
2020	816		17.4%
U.S. Decennial Census; 1850–1870 1880; 1890–1910 1920–1930; 1930–1940 1940–1950; 1960–1980 1980–2000

In 2020, its population was 816.

== Government and infrastructure ==
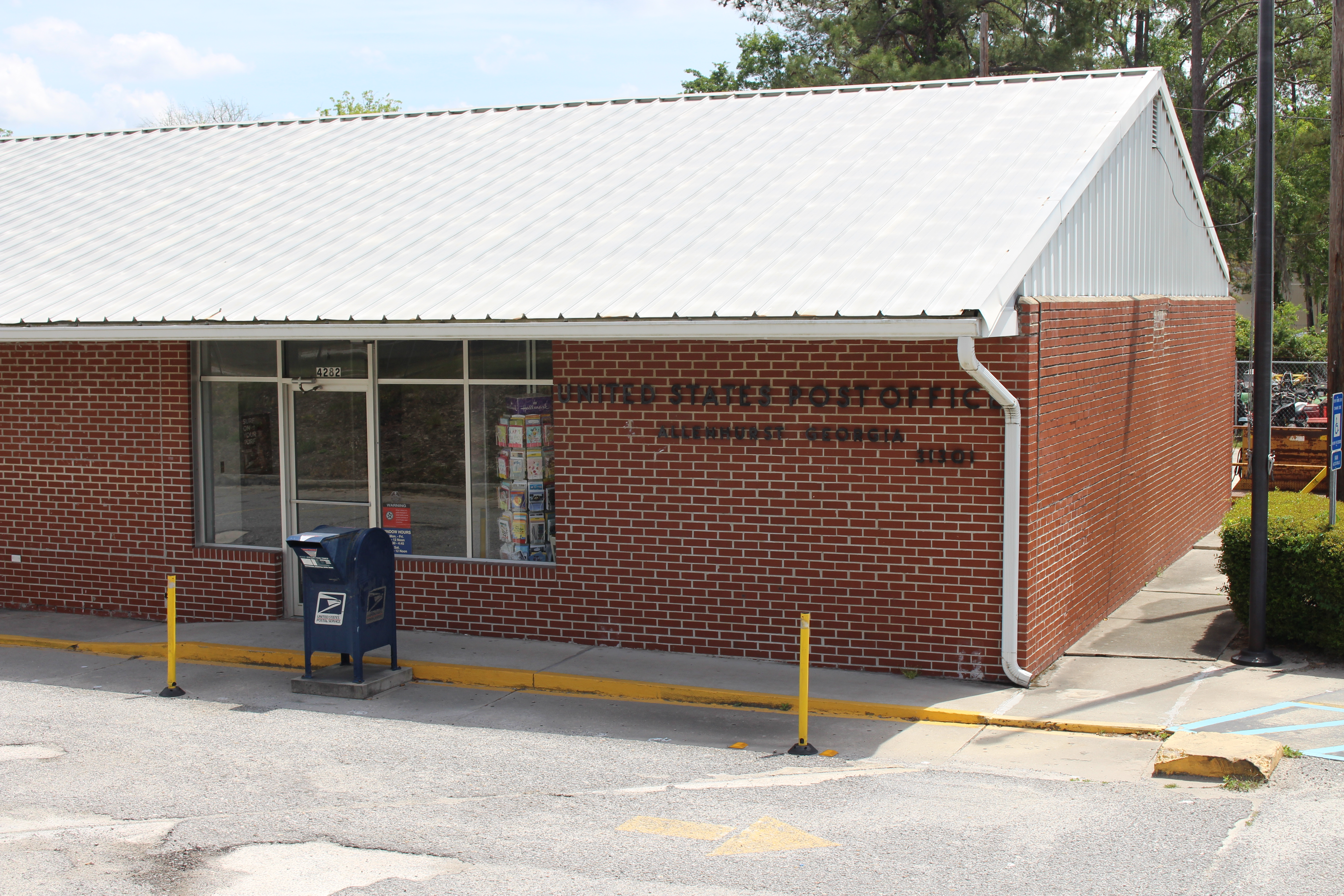
Post office

The United States Postal Service operates the Allenhurst Post Office. The current mayor of Allenhurst is James Willis.

== Education ==
The Liberty County School District operates public schools that serve Allenhurst.
