= 2019–20 Pac-12 Conference men's basketball season =

2019–20 Pac–12 men's basketball season
- League: NCAA Division I
- Sport: Basketball
- Teams: 12
- TV partner(s): ESPN, ESPN2, ESPNU, Fox Sports 1, FOX, Pac-12 Network, CBS

Regular season
- Regular season champions: Oregon
- Season MVP: Payton Pritchard, Oregon
- Top scorer: Payton Pritchard, Oregon

Pac-12 tournament
- Champions: Tournament Canceled due to Covid-19
- Runners-up: −
- Tournament MVP: −

Pac-12 men's basketball seasons
- ← 2018–19 2020–21 →

2019–20 Pac-12 Conference men's basketball standings
	Conf.				Overall
Team	W		L	PCT	W		L	PCT
No. 13 Oregon	13	–	5	.722	24	–	7	.774
UCLA	12	–	6	.667	19	–	12	.613
USC	11	–	7	.611	22	–	9	.710
Arizona State	11	–	7	.611	20	–	11	.645
Arizona	10	–	8	.556	21	–	11	.656
Colorado	10	–	8	.556	21	–	11	.656
Stanford	9	–	9	.500	20	–	12	.625
Oregon State	7	–	11	.389	18	–	13	.581
Utah	7	–	11	.389	16	–	15	.516
California	7	–	11	.389	14	–	18	.438
Washington State	6	–	12	.333	16	–	16	.500
Washington	5	–	13	.278	15	–	17	.469
Note: The 2020 Pac-12 Tournament was canceled prior to the quarterfinals due to the COVID-19 pandemic. Rankings from AP poll

The 2019–20 Pac-12 Conference men's basketball season began with practices in October 2019 followed by the 2019–20 NCAA Division I men's basketball season in November 2019. The conference schedule began in December 2019. This was the eighth season under the Pac–12 Conference name and the 60th since the conference was established under its current charter as the Athletic Association of Western Universities in 1959. Including the history of the Pacific Coast Conference, which operated from 1915 to 1959 and is considered by the Pac-12 as a part of its own history, this is the Pac-12's 104th season of basketball.

The Pac-12 tournament was scheduled from March 11–14, 2020 at the T-Mobile Arena in Paradise, Nevada. On March 12, the Pac-12 cancelled the tournament prior to its second round due to the COVID-19 pandemic.

== Pre-season ==
=== Recruiting classes ===
Rankings
Team	ESPN	Rivals	Scout/247 Sports	Signees
Arizona	No. 6	No. 11	No. 5	4
Arizona State	-	No. 21	No. 37	6
California	-	No. 76	No. 48	3
Colorado	-	-	-	1
Oregon	No. 15	No. 15	No. 17	6
Oregon State	-	No. 47	No. 69	6
Stanford	-	No. 56	No. 43	3
UCLA	-	No. 72	No. 91	2
USC	No. 8	No. 5	No. 10	6
Utah	-	No. 45	No. 40	4
Washington	No. 5	No. 7	No. 8	4
Washington State	-		No. 71	4

=== Preseason watchlists ===
Below is a table of notable preseason watch lists.

	Wooden	Naismith	Robertson	Cousy	West	Erving	Malone	Abdul-Jabbar	Olson
C. J. Elleby	✓					✓			
Chase Jeter								✓	
Josh Green						✓			
Nico Mannion	✓	✓							
Remy Martin				✓					
Jaden McDaniels	✓					✓			
Isaiah Mobley							✓		
Zeke Nnaji			✓						
Payton Pritchard	✓	✓	✓	✓					
Nick Rakovevic	✓		✓					✓	
Isaiah Stewart	✓	✓						✓	✓
Tres Tinkle	✓	✓	✓			✓			✓
McKinley Wright IV	✓	✓	✓	✓					

=== Preseason All-American teams ===
	ESPN	CBS	USA	AP	Blue; Ribbon	Athlon; Sports	NBC; Sports	Street & Smith's	Sporting News	Sports; Illustrated
Payton Pritchard				RV						
Isaiah Stewart		2nd		RV			2nd			
McKinley Wright IV				RV						

=== Preseason polls ===
	AP	Athlon; Sports	Blue Ribbon; Yearbook	CBS Sports	Coaches	ESPN	KenPom	Lindy's; Sports	NBC Sports	Sporting; News	Street & Smith's	Sports; Illustrated
Arizona	No. 21			No. 21	No. 17	No. 18	No. 24	No. 25	No. 16	No. 20	No. 25	No. 15
Arizona State				No. 64			No. 89					
California				No. 138			No. 179					
Colorado		No. 16	No. 16	No. 31		No. 24	No. 37	No. 16			No. 23	
Oregon	No. 15		No. 14	No. 16	No. 14	No. 7	No. 30		No. 15	No. 12		No. 22
Oregon State				No. 78			No. 73					
Stanford				No. 105			No. 90					
UCLA				No. 80			No. 107					
USC				No. 63			No. 48					
Utah				No. 91			No. 114					
Washington				No. 43		No. 23	No. 52	No. 20			No. 17	No. 20
Washington State				No. 163			No. 163					

=== Pac-12 Media days ===
Men's Basketball Media Preseason Poll
Place	Team	Points	First place votes
1.	Oregon	291 Pts	9
2.	Colorado	288 Pts	9
3.	Washington	273 Pts	6
4.	Arizona	263 Pts	2
5.	USC	198 Pts	1
6.	Arizona State	187 Pts	--
7.	Oregon State	161 Pts	--
8.	UCLA	148 Pts	--
9.	Utah	131 Pts	--
10.	Stanford	84 Pts	--
11.	Washington State	47 Pts	--
12.	California	35 Pts	--

=== Early season tournaments ===
Team	Tournament	Finish
Arizona	Wooden Legacy	1st
Arizona State	Hall of Fame Tip Off	2nd
California	2K Sports Classic	4th
Colorado	MGM Resorts Main Event	1st
Oregon	Battle 4 Atlantis	4th
Oregon State	—	—
Stanford	CBE Hall of Fame Classic	2nd
UCLA	Maui Invitational	6th
USC	ESPN Orlando Invitational	3rd
Utah	Myrtle Beach Invitational	6th
Washington	Diamond Head Classic	2nd
Washington State	Cayman Islands Classic	6th

=== Pac-12 Preseason All-Conference ===
First Team

Name	School	Pos.	Yr.	Ht., Wt.	Hometown (Last School)
Tyler Bey	Colorado	G/F	Jr.	6−7, 206	Las Vegas, Nev. (Middlebrooks Academy)
C. J. Elleby	Washington State	F	So.	6−6, 200	Seattle, Wash. (Cleveland HS)
Nico Mannion	Arizona	G	Fr.	6−3, 190	Siena, Italy (Pinnacle HS)
Remy Martin	Arizona State	G	Jr.	6−0, 170	Chatsworth, Cali. (Sierra Canyon HS)
Jaden McDaniels	Washington	F	Fr.	6−9, 200	Seattle, Wash. (Federal HS)
Payton Pritchard	Oregon	G	Sr.	6−2, 190	West Linn, Ore. (West Linn HS)
Nick Rakocevic	USC	F	Sr.	6−11, 225	Chicago, Ill. (St. Joseph's)
Isaiah Stewart	Washington	F	Fr.	6−9, 240	Rochester, N.Y. (La Lumiere)
Tres Tinkle	Oregon State	F	Sr.	6−8, 220	Missoula, Mont. (Hellgate HS)
McKinley Wright IV	Colorado	G	Jr.	6−0, 195	North Robbinsdale, Minn. (Champlin Park)

Second Team

Name	School	Pos.	Yr.	Ht., Wt.	Hometown (Last School)
Timmy Allen	Utah	F	So.	6−6, 210	Mesa, Ariz. (Red Mountain HS)
N'Faly Dante	Oregon	C	Fr.	6−11, 230	Bamako, Mali (Sunrise Christian Academy)
Daejon Davis	Stanford	G	Jr.	6−3, 185	Seattle, Wash. (Garfield HS)
Josh Green	Arizona	G	Fr.	6−6, 210	Sydney, Australia (IMG Academy)
Ethan Thompson	Oregon State	G	Jr.	6−5, 190	Los Angeles, Calif. (Bishop Montgomery HS)

Honorable Mention

- October 8, 2019 – Pac-12 Men's Basketball Media Day, Pac-12 Networks Studios, San Francisco, Calif.

=== Midseason watchlists ===
Below is a table of notable midseason watch lists.

	John R. Wooden Award	Naismith	Naismith Defensive Player of the Year	Robertson
Tyler Bey			✓	
Kylor Kelley			✓	
Payton Pritchard	✓	✓		✓
Isaiah Stewart	✓	✓		
Tres Tinkle	✓			

=== Final watchlists ===
Below is a table of notable year end watch lists.

	John R. Wooden Award	Naismith	Cousy
Payton Pritchard	✓	✓	✓

== Regular season ==
The Schedule will be released in late September. Before the season, it was announced that for the seventh consecutive season, all regular season conference games and conference tournament games would be broadcast nationally by CBS Sports, FOX Sports, ESPN Inc. family of networks including ESPN, ESPN2 and ESPNU, and the Pac-12 Network.

=== Records against other conferences ===
2019–20 records against non-conference foes:

Regular season

Power Conferences	Record
ACC	2–6
Big East	2–4
Big Ten	3–2
Big 12	4–5
SEC	3–2
Power Conference Total	14–19
Other NCAA Division 1 Conferences	Record
America East	1–0
American	2–3
A-10	1–0
ASUN	1–0
Big Sky	11–0
Big South	–
Big West	14–1
CAA	2–1
C-USA	2–0
Horizon	–
Ivy League	3–1
MAAC	3–0
MAC	2–0
MEAC	3–0
MVC	0–1
Mountain West	14–2
NEC	2–0
OVC	–
Patriot League	–
SoCon	–
Southland	2–0
SWAC	10–0
The Summit	6–1
Sun Belt	2–1
WAC	5–0
WCC	12–9
Other Division I Total	98–20
Division II Total	1–0
NCAA Division I Total	113–40

=== Record against ranked non-conference opponents ===
This is a list of games against ranked opponents only (Rankings from the AP Poll):

Date	Visitor	Home	Site	Significance	Score	Conference record
November 9	No. 16 Baylor	Washington†	Alaska Airlines Center • Anchorage, AK	Armed Forces Classic	W 67–64	1–0
November 12	No. 13 Memphis	No. 14 Oregon†	Moda Center • Portland, OR	Phil Knight Invitational	W 82–74	2–0
November 21	No. 1 Duke	California†	Madison Square Garden • New York City, NY	2K Sports Classic	L 52–87	2–1
November 22	No. 22 Texas	California†	Madison Square Garden • New York City, NY	2K Sports Classic	L 45–62	2–2
November 24	No. 7 Virginia	Arizona State†	Mohegan Sun Arena • Uncasville, CT	Hall of Fame Tip Off	L 45–48	2–3
November 27	No. 3 Michigan State	UCLA†	Lahaina Civic Center • Lahaina, HI	Maui Invitational	L 62–75	2–4
November 27	No. 13 Seton Hall	No. 11 Oregon†	Imperial Arena • Nassau, Bahamas	Battle 4 Atlantis	W 71–69	3–4
November 28	No. 8 Gonzaga	No. 11 Oregon†	Imperial Arena • Nassau, Bahamas	Battle 4 Atlantis	L 72–73 OT	3–5
November 29	No. 6 North Carolina	No. 11 Oregon†	Imperial Arena • Nassau, Bahamas	Battle 4 Atlantis	L 76–78	3–6
December 7	No. 12 Arizona	No. 18 Baylor	Ferrell Center • Waco, TX		L 59–63	3–7
December 7	No. 20 Colorado	No. 2 Kansas	Allen Fieldhouse • Lawrence, KS		L 58–72	3–8
December 8	No. 9 Gonzaga	No. 22 Washington	Alaska Airlines Arena • Seattle, WA		L 76–83	3–9
December 14	No. 10 Oregon	No. 5 Michigan	Crisler Center • Ann Arbor, MI		W 71–70 OT	4–9
December 14	No. 6 Gonzaga	No. 15 Arizona	McKale Center • Tucson, AZ		L 80–84	4–10
December 18	No. 6 Kentucky	Utah†	T-Mobile Arena • Las Vegas, NV		W 69–66	5–10
December 21	No. 13 Dayton	Colorado†	United Center • Chicago, IL	Chicago Legends	W 78–76 OT	6–10
December 21	No. 25 San Diego State	Utah†	Staples Center • Los Angeles, CA	Air Force Reserve Basketball Hall of Fame Classic	L 52–80	6–11
December 29	No. 5 Kansas	Stanford	Maples Pavilion • Stanford, CA		L 56–72	6–12

Team rankings are reflective of AP poll when the game was played, not current or final ranking

† denotes game was played on neutral site

=== Conference schedule ===
This table summarizes the head-to-head results between teams in conference play.

	Arizona	ASU	California	Colorado	Oregon	OSU	Stanford	UCLA	USC	Utah	Washington	WSU
vs. Arizona	–	1–1	0–1	0–1	2–0	1–1	0–1	2–0	1–1	0–1	1–1	0–2
vs. Arizona State	1–1	–	0–1	1–0	1–1	0–2	0–1	1–1	1–1	0–1	1–1	1–1
vs. California	1–0	1–0	–	1–1	2–0	1–1	1–1	1–0	1–0	1–1	1–1	0–2
vs. Colorado	1–0	0–1	1–1	–	1–1	1–1	1–1	2–0	0–2	1–1	0–1	0–1
vs. Oregon	0–2	1–1	0–2	1–1	–	1–1	1–1	0–1	0–1	0–2	0–1	1–0
vs. Oregon State	1–1	2–0	1–1	1–1	1–1	–	0–2	1–0	1–0	1–1	1–0	1–0
vs. Stanford	1–0	1–0	1–1	1–1	1–1	2–0	–	0–1	1–0	1–1	0–2	0–2
vs. UCLA	0–2	1–1	0–1	0–2	1–0	0–1	1–0	–	2–0	0–2	0–2	1–1
vs. USC	1–1	1–1	0–1	2–0	1–0	0–1	0–1	0–2	–	1–1	1–1	0–2
vs. Utah	1–0	1–0	1–1	1–1	2–0	1–1	1–1	2–0	1–1	–	0–1	0–1
vs. Washington	1–1	1–1	1–1	1–0	1–0	0–1	2–0	2–0	1–1	1–0	–	2–0
vs. Washington State	2–0	1–1	2–0	1–0	0–1	0–1	2–0	1–1	2–0	1–0	0–2	–
Total	10–8	11–7	7–11	10–8	13–5	7–11	9–9	12–6	11–7	7–11	5–13	6-12

=== Points scored ===
Team	For	Against	Difference
Arizona	2,368	2,020	348
Arizona State	2,288	2,184	104
California	1,960	2,152	-192
Colorado	2,200	1,975	225
Oregon	2,352	2,069	283
Oregon State	2,136	2,028	108
Stanford	2,172	1,921	251
UCLA	2,153	2,079	74
USC	2,179	2,046	133
Utah	2,130	2,109	21
Washington	2,189	2,049	140
Washington State	2,153	2,161	-8

Through March 10, 2020

=== Rankings ===
	Improvement in ranking
	Drop in ranking
RV	Received votes but were not ranked in Top 25
NV	No votes received

		Pre	Wk 2	Wk 3	Wk 4	Wk 5	Wk 6	Wk 7	Wk 8	Wk 9	Wk 10	Wk 11	Wk 12	Wk 13	Wk 14	Wk 15	Wk 16	Wk 17	Wk 18	Wk 19	Final
Arizona	AP	21	19	14	14	12	15	16	24	25	24	RV	22	RV	23	RV	24	RV	RV	RV	
Arizona	C	17	17	14	14	11	14	17	24	24	24	RV	21	RV	23	RV	21	24	RV	RV	
Arizona State	AP	NV	NV	NV	NV	NV	NV	NV	NV	NV	NV	NV	NV	NV	NV	NV	RV	RV	RV	NV	
Arizona State	C	NV	NV	NV	NV	NV	NV	NV	NV	NV	NV	NV	NV	NV	NV	NV	RV	RV	NV	NV	
California	AP	NV	NV	NV	NV	NV	NV	NV	NV	NV	NV	NV	NV	NV	NV	NV	NV	NV	NV	NV	
California	C	NV	NV	NV	NV	NV	NV	NV	NV	NV	NV	NV	NV	NV	NV	NV	NV	NV	NV	NV	
Colorado	AP	RV	25	23	21	20	24	RV	RV	RV	25	20	23	20	24	16	18	21	RV	RV	
Colorado	C	RV	RV	25	24	21	23	RV	RV	RV	RV	21	RV	21	24	15	17	20	RV	NV	
Oregon	AP	15	14	11	11	13	10	8	6	4	9	8	12	11	14	17	14	14	13	13	
Oregon	C	14	14	11	10	14	13	10	7	6	9	8	13	12	15	18	16	16	13	13	
Oregon State	AP	NV	NV	NV	NV	NV	NV	NV	NV	NV	NV	RV	NV	NV	NV	NV	NV	NV	NV	NV	
Oregon State	C	NV	NV	NV	NV	NV	NV	NV	NV	NV	NV	NV	NV	NV	NV	NV	NV	NV	NV	NV	
Stanford	AP	NV	NV	NV	NV	NV	NV	RV	RV	NV	NV	RV	RV	NV	RV	NV	NV	NV	RV	NV	
Stanford	C	NV	NV	NV	NV	RV	RV	RV	RV	NV	NV	25	RV	RV	RV	NV	NV	NV	RV	NV	
UCLA	AP	NV	NV	NV	NV	NV	NV	NV	NV	NV	NV	NV	NV	NV	NV	NV	NV	RV	RV	RV	
UCLA	C	RV	RV	NV	NV	NV	NV	NV	NV	NV	NV	NV	NV	NV	NV	NV	NV	NV	RV	RV	
USC	AP	RV	NV	RV	NV	NV	NV	NV	NV	NV	NV	NV	RV	RV	NV	NV	NV	NV	RV	NV	
USC	C	RV	RV	RV	NV	NV	NV	NV	NV	NV	NV	NV	RV	RV	NV	NV	NV	NV	RV	RV	
Utah	AP	NV	RV	NV	NV	NV	NV	NV	NV	NV	NV	NV	NV	NV	NV	NV	NV	NV	NV	NV	
Utah	C	NV	NV	RV	NV	NV	NV	NV	NV	NV	NV	NV	NV	NV	NV	NV	NV	NV	NV	NV	
Washington	AP	RV	20	25	23	22	RV	22	21	RV	RV	RV	NV	NV	NV	NV	NV	NV	NV	NV	
Washington	C	RV	RV	24	22	23	25	22	20	RV	RV	NV	NV	NV	NV	NV	NV	NV	NV	NV	
Washington State	AP	NV	NV	NV	NV	NV	NV	NV	NV	NV	NV	NV	NV	NV	NV	NV	NV	NV	NV	NV	
Washington State	C	NV	NV	NV	NV	NV	NV	NV	NV	NV	NV	NV	NV	NV	NV	NV	NV	NV	NV	NV	

== Head coaches ==
=== Coaching changes ===
On December 31, 2018, UCLA fired head coach Steve Alford after 5½ seasons and named assistant coach Murry Bartow interim head coach for the remainder of the season. On April 9, 2019, Cincinnati head coach Mick Cronin was named the new head coach of the Bruins.

On March 14, 2019, Washington State fired head coach Ernie Kent after 5 seasons. On March 27, San Francisco head coach Kyle Smith was named the new head coach of the Cougars.

On March 24, 2019, California fired head coach Wyking Jones after 2 seasons. On March 29, the Golden Bears hired former Georgia head coach Mark Fox for the head coaching job.

=== Coaches ===
Note: Stats shown are before the beginning of the season. Overall and Pac-12 records are from time at current school.

Team	Head coach	Previous job	Seasons at school	Overall record	Pac-12 record	Pac-12 titles	NCAA tournaments	NCAA Final Fours	NCAA Championships
Arizona	Sean Miller	Xavier	11th	264–89 (.748)	129–51 (.717)	3	7	0	0
Arizona State	Bobby Hurley	Buffalo	5th	73–58 (.557)	32–40 (.444)	0	2	0	0
California	Mark Fox	Georgia	1st	0–0 (–)	0–0 (–)	0	0	0	0
Colorado	Tad Boyle	Northern Colorado	10th	189–123 (.606)	82-78 (.513)	0	4	0	0
Oregon	Dana Altman	Creighton	10th	235–96 (.710)	105–57 (.648)	3	6	1	0
Oregon State	Wayne Tinkle	Montana	6th	75–83 (.475)	35–55 (.389)	0	1	0	0
Stanford	Jerod Haase	UAB	4th	48–49 (.495)	25–29 (.463)	0	0	0	0
UCLA	Mick Cronin	Cincinnati	1st	0–0 (–)	0–0 (–)	0	0	0	0
USC	Andy Enfield	Florida Gulf Coast	7th	110–93 (.542)	44–64 (.407)	0	2	0	0
Utah	Larry Krystkowiak	New Jersey Nets (assistant)	9th	147–106 (.581)	68–64 (.515)	0	2	0	0
Washington	Mike Hopkins	Syracuse (assistant)	3rd	48–22 (.686)	25–11 (.694)	0	1	0	0
Washington State	Kyle Smith	San Francisco	1st	0–0 (–)	0–0 (–)	0	0	0	0

Notes:

- Overall and Pac-12 records, conference titles, etc. are from time at current school and are through the end the 2018–19 season.
- NCAA tournament appearances are from time at current school only.
- NCAA Final Fours and Championship include time at other schools

== Postseason ==
=== Pac-12 tournament ===
The conference tournament was scheduled for March 11–14, 2020, at the T-Mobile Arena, Paradise, NV. The top four teams had a bye on the first day. Teams were seeded by conference record, with ties broken by record between the tied teams followed by record against the regular-season champion, if necessary. On March 12, the Pac 12 announced the tournament would be canceled due to the COVID-19 pandemic.

First round Wednesday, March 11
8	Oregon State	71
9	Utah	69
5	Arizona	77
12	Washington	70
7	Stanford	51
10	California	63
6	Colorado	68
11	Washington State	82

Quarterfinals; Thursday, March 12
1	#13 Oregon
8	Oregon State
4	USC
5	Arizona
2	UCLA
10	California
3	Arizona State
11	Washington State

Semifinals; Friday, March 13

Championship; Saturday, March 14

* denotes overtime period

=== NCAA tournament ===
Number of teams from the conference were selected to participate:

Seed	Region	School	First Four	First round	Second round	Sweet Sixteen	Elite Eight	Final Four	Championship
			N/A	–	–	–	–	–	–
	Bids	W-L (%):	0–0 (–)	0–0 (–)	0–0 (–)	0–0 (–)	0–0 (–)	0–0 (–)	TOTAL: 0–0 (–)

=== National Invitation Tournament ===
Number of teams from the conference were selected to participate:

Seed	Bracket	School	First round	Second round	Quarterfinals	Semifinals	Finals
			−	−	−	−	−
	Bid	W-L (%):	0–0 (–)	0–0 (–)	0–0 (–)	0–0 (–)	TOTAL: 0–0 (–)

Index to colors and formatting
Pac-12 member won
Pac-12 member lost

== Awards and honors ==
=== Players of the Week ===
Throughout the conference regular season, the Pac-12 offices named one or two players of the week each Monday.

Week	Player of the Week	School	Freshman of the Week	School	Ref.
Nov. 11	Tres Tinkle	Oregon State	Zeke Nnaji	Arizona	
Nov. 18	Nick Rakocevic	USC	Zeke Nnaji (2)	Arizona	
Nov. 25	Onyeka Okongwu	USC	Onyeka Okongwu	USC	
Dec. 2	Remy Martin	Arizona State	Nico Mannion	Arizona	
Dec. 9	Timmy Allen	Utah	Isaiah Stewart	Washington	
Dec. 16	Payton Pritchard	Oregon	Onyeka Okongwu (2)	USC	
Dec. 23	Timmy Allen (2)	Utah	Isaiah Stewart (2)	Washington	
Dec. 30	Chris Duarte	Oregon	Isaiah Stewart (3)	Washington	
Jan. 6	McKinley Wright IV	Colorado	Isaiah Stewart (4)	Washington	
Jan. 13	Matt Bradley	California	Tyrell Terry	Stanford	
Jan. 20	C. J. Elleby	Washington State	Zeke Nnaji (3)	Arizona	
Jan. 27	Chris Duarte (2)	Oregon	Rylan Jones	Utah	
Feb. 3	Oscar da Silva	Stanford	Jaime Jaquez Jr.	UCLA	
Feb. 10	C. J. Elleby (2)	Washington State	Branden Carlson	Utah	
Feb. 17	Remy Martin (2)	Arizona State	Zeke Nnaji (4)	Arizona	
Feb. 24	Payton Pritchard (2)	Oregon	Tyger Campbell	UCLA	
Mar. 2	Matt Bradley (2)	California	Tyrell Terry (2)	Stanford	
Mar. 9	Both Gach	Utah	Jaden McDaniels	Washington	

==== Totals per School ====
School	Total
Arizona	5
Utah	5
Washington	5
Oregon	4
USC	4
Stanford	3
Arizona State	2
California	2
UCLA	2
Washington State	2
Colorado	1
Oregon State	1

=== All-Americans ===
- Payton Pritchard, Oregon, First team (Associated Press, Sporting News)

=== All-District ===
The United States Basketball Writers Association (USBWA) named the following from the Pac-12 to their All-District Teams:

District VIII

All-District Team

- Timmy Allen, Utah
- McKinley Wright IV, Colorado

District IX

Player of the Year

- Payton Pritchard, Oregon

All-District Team

- Remy Martin, Arizona State
- Zeke Nnaji, Arizona
- Onyeka Okongwu, USC
- Payton Pritchard, Oregon
- Isaiah Stewart, Washington
- Tres Tinkle, Oregon State

=== Conference awards ===
Voting was by conference coaches.

==== Individual awards ====
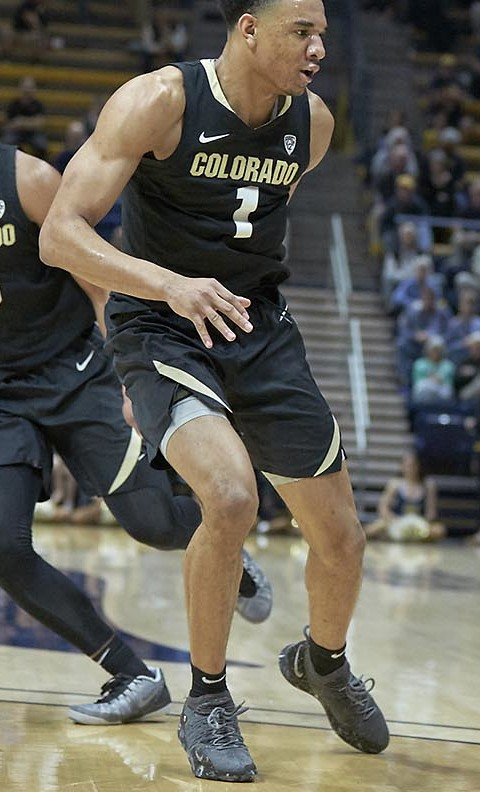
Tyler Bey

Pac-12 individual awards
Award	Recipient(s)
Player of The Year	Payton Pritchard, Sr., Oregon
Coach of the Year	Mick Cronin, UCLA
Defensive Player of The Year	Tyler Bey, G/F, Colorado
Freshman of The Year	Zeke Nnaji, Fr., Arizona
Scholar-Athlete of the Year	Stone Gettings, Sr., Arizona
Most Improved Player of The Year	Chris Smith, Jr., UCLA
Sixth Man of The Year	Alonzo Verge Jr., Jr., Arizona State

==== All-Pac-12 ====
First Team

Name	School	Pos.	Yr.	Ht., Wt.	Hometown (Last School)
CJ Elleby	Washington State	F	So.	6−6, 200	Seattle, WA (Cleveland High School)
Remy Martin†	Arizona State	G	Jr.	6−0, 170	Chatsworth, CA (Sierra Canyon High School)
Zeke Nnaji	Arizona	F	Fr.	6−11, 240	Hopkins, MN (Hopkins High School)
Onyeka Okongwu	USC	F	Fr.	6−9, 245	Chino Hills, Ca (Chino Hills High School)
Payton Pritchard‡	Oregon	G	Sr.	6−2, 190	West Linn, OR (West Linn High School)
Oscar da Silva	Stanford	F	Jr.	6−9, 225	Munich, Germany (Ludwig Gymnasium)
Chris Smith	UCLA	G	Jr.	6−9, 215	Chicago, IL (Huntington Prep)
Isaiah Stewart	Washington	F	Fr.	6−9, 250	Rochester, NY (La Lumiere)
Tres Tinkle†††	Oregon State	F	Sr.	6−8, 220	Missoula, MT (Hellgate High School)
McKinley Wright IV††	Colorado	G	Jr.	6−0, 195	North Robbinsdale, MN (Champlin Park)

- ‡ Pac-12 Player of the Year
- ††† three-time All-Pac-12 First Team honoree
- †† two-time All-Pac-12 First Team honoree
- † two-time All-Pac-12 honoree

Second Team

Name	School	Pos.	Yr.	Ht., Wt.
Timmy Allen	Utah	F	So.	6−6, 205
Tyler Bey	Colorado	G/F	Jr.	6−7, 215
Matt Bradley	California	G	So.	6−4, 220
Nico Mannion	Arizona	G	Fr.	6−3, 190
Jonah Mathews	USC	G	Sr.	6−3, 205

Honorable Mention

- Chris Duarte (ORE, G)
- Tyrell Terry (STAN, G)
- Alonzo Verge Jr. (ASU, G)

==== All-Freshman Team ====
Name	School	Pos.	Ht., Wt.
Nico Mannion	Arizona	G	6−3, 190
Zeke Nnaji‡	Arizona	F	6−11, 240
Onyeka Okongwu	USC	F	6−9, 245
Isiah Stewart	Washington	F	6−9, 250
Tyrell Terry	Stanford	G	6−2, 160

‡ Pac-12 Freshman of the Year

Honorable Mention

- Jaime Jaquez Jr. (UCLA, G)

==== All-Defensive Team ====
Name	School	Pos.	Yr.	Ht., Wt.
Tyler Bey‡	Colorado	G/F	Jr.	6−7, 215
Kylor Kelley††	Oregon State	F	Sr.	7−0, 215
Jonah Mathews	USC	G	Sr.	6−3, 205
Bryce Wills	Stanford	G	So.	6−6, 195
McKinley Wright IV	Colorado	G	Jr.	6−0, 195

- ‡Pac-12 Defensive Player of the Year
- †† two-time Pac-12 All-Defensive Team honoree

Honorable Mention

- Chris Duarte (ORE, G)
- Jalen Hill (UCLA, F)
- Jervae Robinson (WSU, G)
- Dylan Smith (ARIZ, G).

==== All-Academic team ====
The Pac-12 moved to seasonal Academic Honor Rolls, discontinuing sport-by-sport teams, starting in 2019-20

Name	School	Pos.	Ht., Wt.	GPA	Major
Stone Gettings‡	Arizona	F	6−9, 240	4.0	Accounting
Grant Fogerty	Arizona State	G	6−9, 240		Economics
Mickey Mitchell	Arizona State	F	6−7, 225		Liberal Studies
Jacob Orender	California	G	5−11, 180		Master of Education, Cultural Studies of Sport in Education
Aidan McQuade	Colorado	G	5−11, 180		Integrative Physiology
Frank Ryder	Colorado	F	6−10, 235		Economics
Zach Reichle	Oregon State	G	6−5, 200		Business Information Systems
Ethan Thompson	Oregon State	G	6−5, 195		Digital Communication Arts
Daniel Begovich	Stanford	G	6−5, 205		Undeclared
Sam Beskind	Stanford	G	6−4, 190		Undeclared
Oscar da Silva	Stanford	F	6−9, 230		Biology
Keenan Fitzmorris	Stanford	C	7−0, 230		Undeclared
Lukas Kisunas	Stanford	F	6−10, 260		Undeclared
Kodye Pugh	Stanford	F	6−8, 205		Film & Media Studies
Isaac White	Stanford	G	6−2, 180		Sociology
Bryce Wills	Stanford	G	6−6, 205		Undeclared
Alex Olesinski	UCLA	F	6−10, 225		Education
Russell Stong	UCLA	G	6−3, 190		Mechanical Engineering
Riley Battin	Utah	F	6−9, 230		Business Administration
Brooks King	Utah	G	6−3, 170		Finance
Marc Reininger	Utah	F	6−9, 230		Mechanical Engineering
Jason Crandall	Washington	G	6−0, 160		Business Administration Marketing
Jonah Geron	Washington	F	6−6, 200		Pre-Major
Travis Rice	Washington	G	6−2, 185		Communication
Aljaz Kunc	Washington State	F	6−8, 220		Business
Jeff Pollard	Washington State	F	6−9, 240		Business Administration

- ‡ indicates player was Pac-12 Scholar-Athlete of the Year
- †† two-time Pac-12 All-Academic honoree
- ††† three-time Pac-12 All-Academic honoree

== 2020 NBA draft ==
Round	Pick	Player	Position	Nationality	Team	School/club team
1	6	Onyeka Okongwu	PF	United States	Atlanta Hawks	USC (So.)
1	16	Isaiah Stewart	PF/C	United States	Portland Trail Blazers	Washington (Fr.)
1	18	Josh Green	SG	Australia	Dallas Mavericks	Arizona (Fr.)
1	22	Zeke Nnaji	PF/C	United States	Denver Nuggets (from Houston)	Arizona (Fr.)
1	26	Payton Pritchard	PG	United States	Boston Celtics	Oregon (Sr.)
1	28	Jaden McDaniels	SF	United States	Los Angeles Lakers (traded to Oklahoma City) (Note: November 18, 2020: Los Angeles Lakers to Oklahoma City Thunder: Oklahoma City acquired Danny Green and the draft rights to Jaden McDaniels; The L.A. Lakers acquired Dennis Schröder)	Washington (Fr.)
2	31	Tyrell Terry	PG	United States	Dallas Mavericks (from Golden State) (Note: July 7, 2016: Golden State Warriors to Dallas Mavericks: Dallas acquired Andrew Bogut and a 2020 second-round pick; Golden State acquired a top-55 protected 2019 second-round pick that did not convey to them)	Stanford (Fr.)
2	36	Tyler Bey	SF	United States	Philadelphia 76ers (from New York (Note: June 26, 2015: New York Knicks to Philadelphia 76ers: Philadelphia acquired a 2020 second-round pick and a 2021 second-round pick; New York acquired Willy Hernangómez), traded to Dallas) (Note: November 18, 2020: Philadelphia 76ers to Dallas Mavericks: Dallas acquired the draft rights to Bey and Josh Richardson; Philadelphia acquired Seth Curry)	Colorado (Jr.)
2	46	C. J. Elleby	SG	United States	Portland Trail Blazers	Washington State (So.)
2	48	Nico Mannion	PG	Italy	Golden State Warriors (from Dallas via Philadelphia) (Note: February 23, 2017: Dallas Mavericks to Philadelphia 76ers: Philadelphia acquired Andrew Bogut, Justin Anderson, a conditional 2017 second-round pick, and a #55–60 protected 2020 second-round pick; Dallas acquired Nerlens Noel; February 6, 2020: Philadelphia 76ers to Golden State Warriors: Golden State acquired Dallas' #55–60 protected 2020 second-round pick, Denver's 2021 second-round pick, and Toronto's 2022 second-round pick from Philadelphia; Philadelphia acquired Alec Burks and Glenn Robinson III)	Arizona (Fr.)

== Home game attendance ==
Team	Stadium	Capacity	Game 1	Game 2	Game 3	Game 4	Game 5	Game 6	Game 7	Game 8	Game 9	Game 10	Game 11	Game 12	Game 13	Game 14	Game 15	Game 16	Game 17	Game 18	Total	Average	% of Capacity
Arizona	McKale Center	14,644	12,960	13,780	12,755	13,161	12,828	12,943	13,256	**14,644**†	**14,644**†	13,549	14,279	13,816	**14,644**†	13,555	**14,644**†	13,052	13,604		232,114	13,654	93.24%
Arizona State	Desert Financial Arena	14,100	7,496	7,472	7,685	6,889	9,067	9,395	8,795	9,479	9,608	13,500†	7,708	9,628	12,951	9,688	9,829	8,829			148,019	9,251	65.61%
California	Haas Pavilion	11,858	3,780	3,423	4,115	2,242	3,063	3,211	5,734	4,317	3,953	4,660	9,168†	6,117	6,322	6,291	6,046	5,134	6,420		83,996	4,941	41.67%
Colorado	Coors Events Center	11,064	7,713	5,904	6,170	6,169	6,570	6,082	6,753	10,770	7,309	8,017	7,864	9,521	6,656	10,930	10,027	**11,214**†			127,669	7,979	72.12%
Oregon	Matthew Knight Arena	12,364	6,779	7,260	6,017	8,095	6,599	5,803	6,764	6,771	10,113	9,213	7,497	9,309	9,301	9,275	8,542	10,098	7,651	10,862†	145,949	8,108	65.58%
Oregon State	Gill Coliseum	9,604	3,422	6,173	3,553	3,670	3,765	3,946	4,364	4,828	4,911	4,073	6,526†	4,118	4,953	3,718	4,545				65,565	4,438	46.21%
Stanford	Maples Pavilion	7,233	2,930	2,756	2,558	3,491	2,173	2,502	3,298	3,303	6,582	3,691	5,328	3,526	2,820	5,523	3,312	4,839	2,978	7,123†	68,733	3,819	52.79%
UCLA	Pauley Pavilion	13,800	6,265	6,235	6,601	4,427	4,836	4,801	5,243	6,418	13,659†	5,148	5,970	5,566	4,497	5,125	8,014	9,626	11,567		113,998	6,706	48.59%
USC	Galen Center	10,258	3,021	2,720	2,210	2,139	3,625	4,275	2,871	4,312	5,017	4,478	5,736	4,765	4,057	4,121	4,786	7,622†			65,755	4,110	40.06%
Utah	Jon M. Huntsman Center	15,000	9,926	12,760	10,546	11,565	9,888	9,579	13,104†	9,396	9,807	10,049	10,766	9,815	9,765	10,886					137,852	10,561	70.41%
Washington	Alaska Airlines Arena	10,000	7,480	8,072	8,370	8,537	7,178	7,419	9,268†	7,760	9,027	8,774	8,207	9,268†	9,123	9,066	8,622	8,873	9,131		144,175	8,481	84.81%
Washington State	Beasley Coliseum	11,671	2,810	2,704	2,204	1,222	1,995	1,987	2,037	2,122	2,256	2,825	3,082	10,380†	2,811	4,032	4,866	2,860	3,618		53,811	3,165	27.12%
Total		11,800																			1,398,636	7,064	59.86%

Bold – At or Exceed capacity
†Season High
