= 2020 Pac-12 Conference men's basketball tournament =

- Classification: Division I
- Season: 2019–20
- Teams: 12
- Site: T-Mobile Arena; Paradise, Nevada
- Television: Pac-12 Network; Fox Sports 1

2019–20 Pac-12 Conference men's basketball standings
| | Conf. | | | | Overall |
| Team | W | | L | PCT | W | | L | PCT |
|---|---|---|---|---|---|---|---|---|
| No. 13 Oregon | 13 | – | 5 | .722 | 24 | – | 7 | .774 |
| UCLA | 12 | – | 6 | .667 | 19 | – | 12 | .613 |
| USC | 11 | – | 7 | .611 | 22 | – | 9 | .710 |
| Arizona State | 11 | – | 7 | .611 | 20 | – | 11 | .645 |
| Arizona | 10 | – | 8 | .556 | 21 | – | 11 | .656 |
| Colorado | 10 | – | 8 | .556 | 21 | – | 11 | .656 |
| Stanford | 9 | – | 9 | .500 | 20 | – | 12 | .625 |
| Oregon State | 7 | – | 11 | .389 | 18 | – | 13 | .581 |
| Utah | 7 | – | 11 | .389 | 16 | – | 15 | .516 |
| California | 7 | – | 11 | .389 | 14 | – | 18 | .438 |
| Washington State | 6 | – | 12 | .333 | 16 | – | 16 | .500 |
| Washington | 5 | – | 13 | .278 | 15 | – | 17 | .469 |
Note: The 2020 Pac-12 Tournament was canceled prior to the quarterfinals due to the COVID-19 pandemic. Rankings from AP poll

The 2020 Pac-12 Conference men's basketball tournament was a postseason men's basketball tournament for the Pac-12 Conference, scheduled to be played March 11–14, 2020, at T-Mobile Arena on the Las Vegas Strip in Paradise, Nevada. It was canceled after the first round due to the COVID-19 pandemic. The winner of the tournament was to have received the conference's automatic bid to the 2020 NCAA tournament.

The NCAA announced on March 11, 2020 that no fans would be able to attend the Men's and Women's 2020 NCAA tournaments, due to the COVID-19 pandemic. A number of conference basketball tournaments followed suit by either canceling entirely, or playing as scheduled, but with no spectators in attendance. However, tournaments that were held in Las Vegas, including the Pac-12, were conducted with spectators in attendance on Wednesday, March 11. By the evening of March 11, the Pac-12 announced that the remaining games would be played only with "essential staff, television network partners, credentialed media and limited family and friends."

On March 12, the Pac-12 canceled the tournament before any more games were to be played. On the afternoon of March 12, 2020, the NCAA announced that all remaining winter and spring championships for both men's and women's sports were canceled due to the COVID-19 pandemic in the United States. Because of its late West Coast tip-off, the first round match-up between Colorado and Washington State would prove to be the last completed game of the 2019-20 men's basketball season.

== Seeds ==
All 12 Pac-12 schools are eligible to participate in the tournament. Teams will be seeded by conference record, with a tiebreaker system used to seed teams with identical conference records. As a result, the top four teams receive a bye to the quarterfinals of the tournament.

Tie-breaking procedures for determining all tournament seeding was:

- For two-team tie

1. Results of head-to-head competition during the regular season.

2. Each team's record (won-lost percentage) vs. the team occupying the highest position in the final regular standings, and then continuing down through the standings until one team gains an advantage. When arriving at another group of tied teams while comparing records, use each team's record (won-lost percentage) against the collective tied teams as a group (prior to that group's own tie-breaking procedure), rather than the performance against individual tied teams.

3. Won-lost percentage against all Division I opponents.

4. Coin toss conducted by the Commissioner or designee.

- For multiple-team tie

1. Results (won-lost percentage) of collective head-to-head competition during the regular season among the tied teams.

2. If more than two teams are still tied, each of the tied team's record (won-lost percentage) vs. the team occupying the highest position in the final regular season standings, and then continuing down through the standings, eliminating teams with inferior records, until one team gains an advantage.

When arriving at another group of tied teams while comparing records, use each team's record (won-lost percentage) against the collective tied teams as a group (prior to that group's own tie-breaking procedure), rather than the performance against individual tied teams.

After one team has an advantage and is seeded, all remaining teams in the multiple-team tie-breaker will repeat the multiple-team tie-breaking procedure.

If at any point the multiple-team tie is reduced to two teams, the two-team tie-breaking procedure will be applied.

3. Won-lost percentage against all Division I opponents.

4. Coin toss conducted by the Commissioner or designee.

| Seed | School | Conference | Overall | Tiebreak 1 | Tiebreak 2 | Tiebreak 3 | Tiebreak 4 |
|---|---|---|---|---|---|---|---|
| 1 | Oregon†# | 13–5 | 23–7 | | | | |
| 2 | UCLA# | 12–6 | 19–12 | | | | |
| 3 | Arizona State# | 11–7 | 20–11 | 1–1 vs. USC | 1–1 vs. Oregon | | |
| 4 | USC# | 11–7 | 21–9 | 1–1 vs. Arizona State | 0–1 vs. Oregon | | |
| 5 | Arizona | 10–8 | 20–11 | 1–0 vs. Colorado | | | |
| 6 | Colorado | 10–8 | 21–10 | 0–1 vs. Arizona | | | |
| 7 | Stanford | 9–9 | 20–11 | | | | |
| 8 | Oregon State | 7–11 | 17–13 | 2–2 vs. California/Utah | 1–1 vs. Oregon | | |
| 9 | Utah | 7–11 | 16–14 | 2–2 vs. Oregon State/California | 0–2 vs. Oregon | 0–2 vs. UCLA | 1–2 vs. ASU/USC |
| 10 | California | 7–11 | 13–18 | 2–2 vs. Oregon State/Utah | 0–2 vs. Oregon | 0–1 vs. UCLA | 0–2 vs. ASU/USC |
| 11 | Washington State | 6–12 | 15–16 | | | | |
| 12 | Washington | 5–13 | 15–16 | | | | |
† – Pac-12 Conference regular season champions # – Received a first round bye in the conference tournament.

== Schedule ==
| Game | Time | Matchup | Score | Television | Attendance |
First round – Wednesday, March 11
| 1 | 12:00 pm | No. 8 Oregon State vs. No. 9 Utah | 71−69 | Pac-12 Network | 8,048 |
| 2 | 2:30 pm | No. 5 Arizona vs. No. 12 Washington | 77−70 | Pac-12 Network | 8,048 |
| 3 | 6:00 pm | No. 7 Stanford vs. No. 10 California | 51–63 | Pac-12 Network | 7,452 |
| 4 | 8:30 pm | No. 6 Colorado vs. No. 11 Washington State | 68–82 | Pac-12 Network | 7,452 |
Quarterfinals – Thursday, March 12
| 5 | 12:00 pm | No. 1 Oregon vs. No. 8 Oregon State | canceled | Pac-12 Network | N/A |
| 6 | 2:30 pm | No. 4 USC vs. No. 5 Arizona | canceled | Pac-12 Network | N/A |
| 7 | 6:00 pm | No. 2 UCLA vs. No. 10 California | canceled | Pac-12 Network | N/A |
| 8 | 8:30 pm | No. 3 Arizona State vs. No. 11 Washington State | canceled | FS1 | N/A |
Semifinals – Friday, March 13
| 9 | 6:00 pm | Game 5 winner vs. Game 6 winner | canceled | Pac-12 Network | N/A |
| 10 | 8:30 pm | Game 7 winner vs. Game 8 winner | canceled | FS1 | N/A |
Championship – Saturday, March 14
| 11 | 7:30 pm | Game 9 winner vs. Game 10 winner | canceled | FS1 | N/A |
Game times in PT. Rankings denote tournament seed.

== Bracket ==
First round Wednesday, March 11
8 | Oregon State | 71
9 | Utah | 69
5 | Arizona | 77
12 | Washington | 70
7 | Stanford | 51
10 | California | 63
6 | Colorado | 68
11 | Washington State | 82

Quarterfinals; Thursday, March 12
1 | #13 Oregon
8 | Oregon State
4 | USC
5 | Arizona
2 | UCLA
10 | California
3 | Arizona State
11 | Washington State

Semifinals; Friday, March 13

Championship; Saturday, March 14

* denotes overtime period

== Game statistics ==
=== First round ===
Pac-12 Network

March 11
12:00 pm PST

No. 8 Oregon State 71, No. 9 Utah 69
Scoring by half: 31−39, 40−30
| Pts: Tinkle, 19; Rebs: Thompson, 5 Asts: 2 tied, 5 | Pts: Plummer, 35; Rebs: Battin, 8 Asts: Gach, 6 |

T-Mobile Arena
Paradise, NV
Attendance: 8,048
Referees: Eric Curry, Tommy Nunez, Tony Padilla

Pac-12 Network

March 11
2:30 pm PST

No. 5 Arizona 77, No. 12 Washington 70
Scoring by half: 35−30, 42−40
| Pts: Green, 19; Rebs: Nnaji, 19; Asts: Smith, 6 | Pts: Stewart, 29; Rebs: Stewart, 12; Asts: 2 tied, 3 |

T-Mobile Arena
Paradise, NV
Attendance: 8,048
Referees: Dave Hall, Verne Harris, Mike Reed

Pac-12 Network

March 11
6:00 pm PST

No. 7 Stanford 51, No. 10 California 63
Scoring by half: 20−30, 31−33
| Pts: Davis, 16; Rebs: da Silva, 7 Asts: Davis, 3 | Pts: 2 tied, 18; Rebs: Anticevich, 8 Asts: Austin, 3 |

T-Mobile Arena
Paradise, NV
Attendance: 7,452
Referees: Randy McCall, Deldre Carr, Mike Scyphers

Pac-12 Network

March 11
8:30 pm PST

No. 6 Colorado 68, No. 11 Washington State 82
Scoring by half: 25−35, 43−47
| Pts: Wright IV, 21; Rebs: Wright IV, 9 Asts: 2 tied, 1 | Pts: Elleby, 30; Rebs: Elleby, 10; Asts: Elleby, 5 |

T-Mobile Arena
Paradise, NV
Attendance: 7,452
Referees: Chris Rastatter, Michael Irving, Greg Nixon

=== Quarterfinals ===
Pac-12 Network

March 12
12:00 pm PST

No. 1 Oregon vs. No. 8 Oregon State

T-Mobile Arena
Paradise, NV

Pac-12 Network

March 12
2:30 pm PST

No. 4 USC vs. No. 5 Arizona

T-Mobile Arena
Paradise, NV

Pac-12 Network

March 12
6:00 pm PST

No. 2 UCLA vs. No. 10 California

T-Mobile Arena
Paradise, NV

FS1

March 12
8:30 pm PST

No. 3 Arizona State vs. No. 11 Washington State

T-Mobile Arena
Paradise, NV

=== Semifinals ===
Pac-12 Network

March 13
6:00 pm PST

Game 5 Winner vs. Game 6 Winner

T-Mobile Arena
Paradise, NV

FS1

March 13
8:30 pm PST

Game 7 Winner vs. Game 8 Winner

T-Mobile Arena
Paradise, NV

=== Championship ===
FS1

March 14
7:30 pm PST

Game 9 Winner vs. Game 10 Winner

T-Mobile Arena
Paradise, NV

== Awards and honors ==
=== Hall of Honor ===
The following former players were inducted into the Pac-12 Hall of Honor, though a planned ceremony on Friday, March 13 prior to the tourney's semifinals did not occur due to its cancelation. They are: Sean Rooks (Arizona men's basketball), Melissa Belote Ripley (Arizona State women's swimming), Don Bowden (California men's track & field), Bill Marolt (Colorado men's skiing), Dan Fouts (Oregon football), Joni Huntley (Oregon State women's track & field), Jennifer Azzi (Stanford women's basketball), Jonathan Ogden (UCLA football), Barbara Hedges (USC athletic director), Kathy Kreiner-Phillips (Utah women's skiing), Lincoln Kennedy (Washington football), and Jeanne Eggart Helfer (Washington State women's basketball).

=== Team and tournament leaders ===
| Team | Points | | Rebounds | | Assists | | Steals | | Blocks | | Minutes | |
| Arizona | Green | 19 | Nnaji | 9 | Smith | 6 | Mannion | 4 | Koloko | 2 | 2 tied | 36 |
| Arizona State | DNP | | | | | | | | | | | |
| California | 2 tied | 18 | Anticevich | 8 | Austin | 3 | Brown | 2 | 2 tied | 1 | South | 32 |
| Colorado | Wright IV | 21 | Wright IV | 9 | 4 tied | 1 | Bey | 2 | Parquet | 2 | Bey | 32 |
| Oregon | DNP | | | | | | | | | | | |
| Oregon State | Tinkle | 19 | Thompson | 5 | 2 tied | 5 | Reichle | 3 | Kelly | 2 | Thompson | 39 |
| Stanford | Davis | 16 | da Silva | 7 | Davis | 3 | Davis | 2 | 2 tied | 1 | Davis | 38 |
| UCLA | DNP | | | | | | | | | | | |
| USC | DNP | | | | | | | | | | | |
| Utah | Plummer | 35 | Battin | 8 | Gach | 6 | Gach | 2 | None | 0 | 2 tied | 38 |
| Washington | Stewart | 29 | Stewart | 9 | 2 tied | 3 | Bey | 4 | 2 tied | 1 | Stewart | 32 |
| Washington State | Elleby | 32 | Elleby | 10 | Bonton | 6 | Elleby | 3 | 3 tied | 1 | Elleby | 37 |

== Tournament notes ==
- The conference tournament was cancelled before completion, as were the 2020 NCAA Division I men's basketball tournament and 2020 National Invitation Tournament.

== See also ==
- 2020 Pac-12 Conference women's basketball tournament
