= 2019–20 Arizona State Sun Devils men's basketball team =

American college basketball season

2019–20 Arizona State Sun Devils men's basketball
- Conference: Pac-12 Conference
- Record: 20–11 (11–7 Pac–12)
- Head coach: Bobby Hurley (5th season)
- Assistant coaches: Rashon Burno (2nd season); Eric Brown (1st season); Rasheen Davis (1st season)
- Home arena: Desert Financial Arena

2019–20 Pac-12 Conference men's basketball standings
	Conf.				Overall
Team	W		L	PCT	W		L	PCT
No. 13 Oregon	13	–	5	.722	24	–	7	.774
UCLA	12	–	6	.667	19	–	12	.613
USC	11	–	7	.611	22	–	9	.710
Arizona State	11	–	7	.611	20	–	11	.645
Arizona	10	–	8	.556	21	–	11	.656
Colorado	10	–	8	.556	21	–	11	.656
Stanford	9	–	9	.500	20	–	12	.625
Oregon State	7	–	11	.389	18	–	13	.581
Utah	7	–	11	.389	16	–	15	.516
California	7	–	11	.389	14	–	18	.438
Washington State	6	–	12	.333	16	–	16	.500
Washington	5	–	13	.278	15	–	17	.469
Note: The 2020 Pac-12 Tournament was canceled prior to the quarterfinals due to the COVID-19 pandemic. Rankings from AP poll

The 2019–20 Arizona State Sun Devils men's basketball team represented Arizona State University during the 2019–20 NCAA Division I men's basketball season. The Sun Devils were led by fifth-year head coach Bobby Hurley, and played their home games at Desert Financial Arena in Tempe, Arizona as members of the Pac–12 Conference. They finished the season 20–11, 11–7 in Pac-12 play to finish in a tie for third place. They were set to take on Washington State in the quarterfinals of the Pac-12 tournament. However, the remainder of the tournament, and all other postseason tournaments, were cancelled amid the COVID-19 pandemic.

== Previous season ==
The Sun Devils finished the season 23–11, 12–6 in Pac-12 play to finish for second place. In the Pac-12 tournament, the Sun Devils defeated UCLA in the quarterfinals and lost to Oregon in the semifinals. They received an at-large bid to the NCAA tournament where they defeated St. John's in the First Four, and eventually lost in the first round to Buffalo.

== Off-season ==
=== Departures ===
Name	Pos.	Height	Weight	Year	Hometown	Reason for departure
Zylan Cheatham	F	6'8"	220	RS Senior	Phoenix, Arizona	Completed athletic eligibility
De'Quon Lake	F	6'10"	225	Senior	Charlotte Amalie, U.S. Virgin Islands	Graduated
Vitaliy Shibel	F	6'9"	210	RS Sophomore	Ivano-Frankivsk, Ukraine	Graduate transferred to UNLV
Jack Roggin	G	6'0"	165	Sophomore	Calabasas, California	Walk-on; not on team roster
Jordan Salzman	G	5'10"	175	Sophomore	Locust Valley, New York	Walk-on; not on team roster
Trevor Thompson	G	6'2"	175	Sophomore	Phoenix, Arizona	Walk-on; transferred to Notre Dame de Namur
Uroš Plavšić	C	7'0"	240	Freshman	Ivanjica, Serbia	Transferred to Tennessee
Luguentz Dort	G	6'4"	215	Freshman	Montreal, Quebec	Declared for 2019 NBA draft

=== Incoming transfers ===
Name	Pos.	Height	Weight	Year	Previous School	Notes
Alonzo Verge Jr.	G	6'3"	170	Jr.	Moberly Area Community College	As a junior college transfer, Verge is eligible to play immediately and have two years of eligibility left.
Khalid Thomas	F	6'9"	202	Jr.	College of Southern Idaho	No. 2 Junior College player in the country. As a junior college transfer, Thomas is eligible to play immediately.

=== 2019 recruiting class ===
College recruiting information
Name	Hometown	School	Height	Weight	Commit date
Jaelen House; PG	Phoenix, AZ	Shadow Mountain	6 ft 1 in (1.85 m)	160 lb (73 kg)	Dec 22, 2017
Jaelen House; PG	Recruit ratings: Scout: Rivals: 247Sports: ESPN: (81)				
Jalen Graham; PF	Phoenix, AZ	Mountain Pointe	6 ft 9 in (2.06 m)	205 lb (93 kg)	Dec 21, 2018
Jalen Graham; PF	Recruit ratings: Scout: Rivals: 247Sports: ESPN: (82)				
Caleb Christopher; G	Carson, CA	Mayfair	6 ft 0 in (1.83 m)	180 lb (82 kg)	Mar 2, 2019
Caleb Christopher; G	Recruit ratings: Scout: Rivals: 247Sports: ESPN: (NR)				
Overall recruit ranking:
Note: In many cases, Scout, Rivals, 247Sports, On3, and ESPN may conflict in their listings of height and weight.; In these cases, the average was taken. ESPN grades are on a 100-point scale.; Sources: "2019 Team Ranking". Rivals.

== Roster ==
2019–20 Arizona State Sun Devils men's basketball team
Players
Coaches

Pos.	#	Name	Height	Weight	Year	Previous school	Hometown
F	00	Mickey Mitchell	6 ft 7 in (2.01 m)	225 lb (102 kg)	RS Sr	Ohio State	Orlando, Florida
G	1	Remy Martin	6 ft 0 in (1.83 m)	170 lb (77 kg)	Jr	Sierra Canyon School	Chatsworth, California
G	2	Rob Edwards	6 ft 5 in (1.96 m)	205 lb (93 kg)	RS Sr	Cleveland State	Detroit, Michigan
G	3	Caleb Christopher	6 ft 1 in (1.85 m)	180 lb (82 kg)	Fr	Mayfair HS	Carson, California
F	4	Kimani Lawrence	6 ft 8 in (2.03 m)	220 lb (100 kg)	Jr	New Hampton School	Providence, Rhode Island
G	5	Elias Valtonen	6 ft 7 in (2.01 m)	195 lb (88 kg)	So	HBA-Märsky	Eura, Finland
G	10	Jaelen House	6 ft 2 in (1.88 m)	160 lb (73 kg)	Fr	Shadow Mountain HS	Phoenix, Arizona
G	11	Alonzo Verge Jr.	6 ft 3 in (1.91 m)	167 lb (76 kg)	Jr	Moberly Area CC	Chicago, Illinois
G	12	Micah Burno (W)	6 ft 0 in (1.83 m)	180 lb (82 kg)	Fr	Chaparral HS	Scottsdale, Arizona
F	15	John Olmsted (W)	6 ft 10 in (2.08 m)	215 lb (98 kg)	Fr	Morenci HS	Morenci, Arizona
F	20	Khalid Thomas	6 ft 9 in (2.06 m)	210 lb (95 kg)	Jr	College of Southern Idaho	Portland, Oregon
F	22	Andre Allen	6 ft 9 in (2.06 m)	210 lb (95 kg)	Jr	Arizona Western College	Los Angeles, California
F	23	Romello White	6 ft 8 in (2.03 m)	235 lb (107 kg)	RS Jr	Joseph Wheeler HS	Atlanta, Georgia
F	24	Jalen Graham	6 ft 9 in (2.06 m)	205 lb (93 kg)	Fr	Mountain Pointe HS	Phoenix, Arizona
G	25	Grant Fogerty (W)	5 ft 11 in (1.8 m)	175 lb (79 kg)	Sr	Desert Mountain HS	Scottsdale, Arizona
G	30	Kyle Feit (W)	6 ft 4 in (1.93 m)	190 lb (86 kg)	So	IMG Academy	West Palm Beach, Florida
F	35	Taeshon Cherry	6 ft 8 in (2.03 m)	210 lb (95 kg)	So	Foothills Christian HS	El Cajon, California

Head coach

- Bobby Hurley (Duke)

Assistant coach(es)

- Rashon Burno (DePaul)
- Eric Brown (Cal State Fullerton)
- Ben Wood (Connecticut)

Legend

- (C) Team captain
- (S) Suspended
- (I) Ineligible
- (W) Walk-on
- Injured
- Current redshirt

Roster
Last update: November 13, 2019

=== Depth chart ===
Pos.	Starting 5	Bench 1	Bench 2	Bench 3
C	Romello White	Khalid Thomas		John Olmstead
PF	Mickey Mitchell	Jalen Graham	Taeshon Cherry	Andre Allen
SF	Kimani Lawrence		Elias Valtonen	Kyle Feit
SG	Rob Edwards	Alonzo Verge Jr.	Caleb Christopher	Micah Burno
PG	Remy Martin	Jaelen House		Grant Fogerty

== Schedule and results ==
Date time, TV	Rank^{#}	Opponent^{#}	Result	Record	High points	High rebounds	High assists	Site (attendance) city, state
Non-conference regular season
November 8, 2019*; 8:30 pm, ESPN2		vs. Colorado; Pac-12 China Game	L 71–81	0–1	23 – Martin	9 – Martin	8 – Martin	Baoshan Sports Centre (4,328); Shanghai, China
November 14, 2019*; 8:00 pm, P12N		Central Connecticut; Air Force Reserve Tip Off	W 90–49	1–1	23 – Edwards	11 – White	5 – Verge Jr.	Desert Financial Arena (7,496); Tempe, AZ
November 17, 2019*; 4:00 pm, P12N		Rider; Air Force Reserve Tip Off	W 92–55	2–1	20 – Tied	7 – White	4 – Verge Jr.	Desert Financial Arena (7,472); Tempe, AZ
November 23, 2019*; 12:30 pm, ESPN3		vs. St. John's; Air Force Reserve Tip Off semifinal	W 80–67	3–1	19 – Martin	9 – White	3 – House	Mohegan Sun Arena; Uncasville, CT
November 24, 2019*; 11:00 am, ESPN		vs. No. 7 Virginia; Air Force Reserve Tip Off championship	L 45–48	3–2	21 – Martin	6 – Edwards	3 – Tied	Mohegan Sun Arena; Uncasville, CT
November 26, 2019*; 5:00 pm, ESPN+		at Princeton	W 67–65	4–2	33 – Martin	9 – White	3 – White	Jadwin Gymnasium (2,727); Princeton, NJ
December 3, 2019*; 8:00 pm, CBSSN		at San Francisco	W 71–67	5–2	14 – Tied	11 – White	5 – Martin	The Sobrato Center (2,892); San Francisco, CA
December 7, 2019*; 7:30 pm, P12N		Louisiana	W 77–65	6–2	19 – White	19 – White	4 – Martin	Desert Financial Arena (7,685); Tempe, AZ
December 11, 2019*; 8:00 pm, P12N		Prairie View A&M	W 88–79	7–2	21 – Martin	16 – White	3 – Martin	Desert Financial Arena (6,889); Tempe, AZ
December 14, 2019*; 6:00 pm, P12N		Georgia	W 79–59	8–2	23 – Martin	17 – White	6 – Martin	Desert Financial Arena (9,067); Tempe, AZ
December 18, 2019*; 7:00 pm, P12N		vs. Saint Mary's; Basketball Hall of Fame Showcase	L 56–96	8–3	43 – Verge Jr.	12 – White	2 – Verge Jr.	Talking Stick Resort Arena (6,892); Phoenix, AZ
December 21, 2019*; 6:30 pm, P12N		Creighton	L 60–67	8–4	19 – Verge Jr.	12 – White	7 – Martin	Desert Financial Arena (9,395); Tempe, AZ
December 28, 2019*; 1:00 pm, P12N		Texas Southern	W 98–81	9–4	23 – Tied	6 – Verge Jr.	7 – Verge Jr.	Desert Financial Arena (8,795); Tempe, AZ
Pac-12 regular season
January 4, 2020; 7:30 pm, P12N		at No. 25 Arizona; Rivalry	L 47–75	9–5 (0–1)	20 – Martin	1 – Tied	5 – Tied	McKale Center (14,644); Tucson, AZ
January 9, 2020; 9:00 pm, ESPNU		at Oregon State	W 82–76	10–5 (1–1)	24 – Martin	9 – White	5 – Verge Jr.	Gill Coliseum (4,828); Corvallis, OR
January 11, 2020; 8:30 pm, P12N		at No. 9 Oregon	L 69–78	10–6 (1–2)	29 – Martin	9 – White	6 – Martin	Matthew Knight Arena (9,213); Eugene, OR
January 16, 2020; 7:00 pm, ESPN2		No. 20 Colorado	L 61–68	10–7 (1–3)	25 – Martin	10 – White	6 – Martin	Desert Financial Arena (9,479); Tempe, AZ
January 18, 2020; 7:00 pm, P12N		Utah	W 83–64	11–7 (2–3)	24 – Edwards	5 – Cherry	6 – Martin	Desert Financial Arena (9,608); Tempe, AZ
January 25, 2020; 7:30 pm, P12N		No. 22 Arizona; Rivalry	W 66–65	12–7 (3–3)	24 – Martin	7 – Tied	4 – Martin	Desert Financial Arena (13,500); Tempe, AZ
January 29, 2020; 9:00 pm, ESPNU		at Washington State	L 65–67	12–8 (3–4)	15 – White	11 – White	4 – White	Beasley Coliseum (2,811); Pullman, WA
February 1, 2020; 8:30 pm, P12N		at Washington	W 87–83	13–8 (4–4)	19 – Martin	7 – Tied	2 – Edwards	Alaska Airlines Arena (9,066); Seattle, WA
February 6, 2020; 9:00 pm, ESPN2		UCLA	W 84–66	14–8 (5–4)	26 – Verge Jr.	16 – White	7 – Martin	Desert Financial Arena (7,708); Tempe, AZ
February 8, 2020; 8:00 pm, FS1		USC	W 66–64	15–8 (6–4)	22 – Martin	10 – White	3 – Tied	Desert Financial Arena (9,628); Tempe, AZ
February 13, 2020; 9:00 pm, ESPN2		at Stanford	W 74–69	16–8 (7–4)	24 – Martin	7 – Verge Jr.	4 – Verge Jr.	Maples Pavilion (3,312); Stanford, CA
February 16, 2020; 4:00 pm, ESPNU		at California	W 80–75	17–8 (8–4)	22 – Tied	10 – White	5 – Martin	Haas Pavilion (6,046); Berkeley, CA
February 20, 2020; 7:00 pm, ESPN		No. 14 Oregon	W 77–72	18–8 (9–4)	26 – Verge Jr.	11 – White	5 – Martin	Desert Financial Arena (12,951); Tempe, AZ
February 22, 2020; 6:00 pm, ESPNU		Oregon State	W 74–73	19-8 (10-4)	17 – Tied	7 – White	4 – Martin	Desert Financial Arena (9,688); Tempe, AZ
February 27, 2020; 9:00 pm, P12N		at UCLA	L 72–75	19–9 (10–5)	30 – Martin	6 – White	3 – Martin	Pauley Pavilion (9,626); Los Angeles, CA
February 29, 2020; 6:00 pm, ESPNU		at USC	L 61–71	19–10 (10–6)	22 – Martin	9 – White	4 – Martin	Galen Center (4,786); Los Angeles, CA
March 5, 2020; 7:00 pm, ESPN2		Washington	L 83–90	19–11 (10–7)	23 – Edwards	7 – Cherry	6 – Martin	Desert Financial Arena (9,829); Tempe, AZ
March 7, 2020; 4:30 pm, P12N		Washington State	W 83–74	20–11 (11–7)	20 – Verge Jr.	7 – Verge Jr.	6 – Martin	Desert Financial Arena (8,829); Tempe, AZ
Pac-12 tournament
March 12, 2020; 9:30 pm, FS1	(3)	vs. (11) Washington State; Quarterfinals	Cancelled due to the COVID-19 pandemic					T-Mobile Arena; Paradise, NV
*Non-conference game. ^{#}Rankings from AP Poll. (#) Tournament seedings in parentheses. All times are in Mountain Time.
