= Kyle Smith (basketball) =

American basketball coach (born 1969)

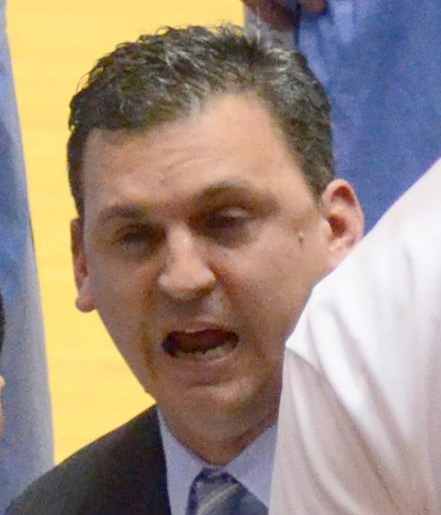
- Smith in 2012.

Current position
- Title: Head coach
- Team: Stanford
- Conference: ACC
- Record: 44–28 (.611)

Biographical details
- Born: June 26, 1969 (age 57); El Paso, Texas, U.S.

Playing career
- 1987–1991: Hamilton

Coaching career (HC unless noted)
- 1992–2000: San Diego (assistant)
- 2000–2001: Air Force (assistant)
- 2001–2010: Saint Mary's (assistant)
- 2010–2016: Columbia
- 2016–2019: San Francisco
- 2019–2024: Washington State
- 2024–present: Stanford

Head coaching record
- Overall: 302–221 (.577)
- Tournaments: 1–1 (NCAA Division I); 4–3 (NIT); 4–3 (CBI); 6–1 (CIT); 0–1 (CBC)

Accomplishments and honors

Championships
- CIT (2016)

Awards
- Pac-12 Coach of the Year (2024)

Kyle Andrew Smith (born June 26, 1969) is an American college basketball coach who is the men's head coach for the Stanford Cardinal of the ACC. Prior to joining the Cardinal, Smith was the head coach at Columbia University, the University of San Francisco, and Washington State University. In his final season at Columbia, he led the team to a CIT Championship over UC Irvine. His coaching style has been dubbed “Nerdball”, which is a system that utilizes analytics to track and make decisions on many aspects about the team.

== Early life ==
Smith was born in El Paso, Texas, and raised on the Fort Bliss Army base. He played basketball at Alief Hastings High School in Houston, and graduated in 1988.

== Playing career ==
Smith was a member of New York's Hamilton College men's basketball team that achieved a 26–1 record his junior season and achieved the national Division III #1 ranking. He also shot 51.3 percent from three-point range, which still stands as a Hamilton single-season record. Additionally, University of Richmond head men's basketball coach Chris Mooney referred to Smith as "the smartest man in college basketball. I think he has the best feel and overview of basketball programs and coaching of anyone I've ever met." Smith has a master's degree in educational leadership from the University of San Diego.

== Coaching career ==
In his first season at Columbia, Smith piloted the Lions to a 15–13 record, becoming the first new Columbia head coach in 33 years to notch a winning season in his inaugural campaign. Smith backed up his offensive reputation with sterling numbers on that side of the ball in year one in Morningside Heights; the Lions scored over 10 points per game more in 2010–11 than they did the year before and scored more than 70 points 15 times during the entire season.

Smith followed up his first season with 15 more wins in 2011–12, becoming the first Columbia basketball coach to record as many as 30 wins in his first two seasons since Lou Rossini in 1952. Under Smith's tutelage, Columbia starting point guard Brian Barbour was voted first team All-Ivy League, the second straight year a Columbia guard was given this honor (Noruwa Agho, 2010–11).

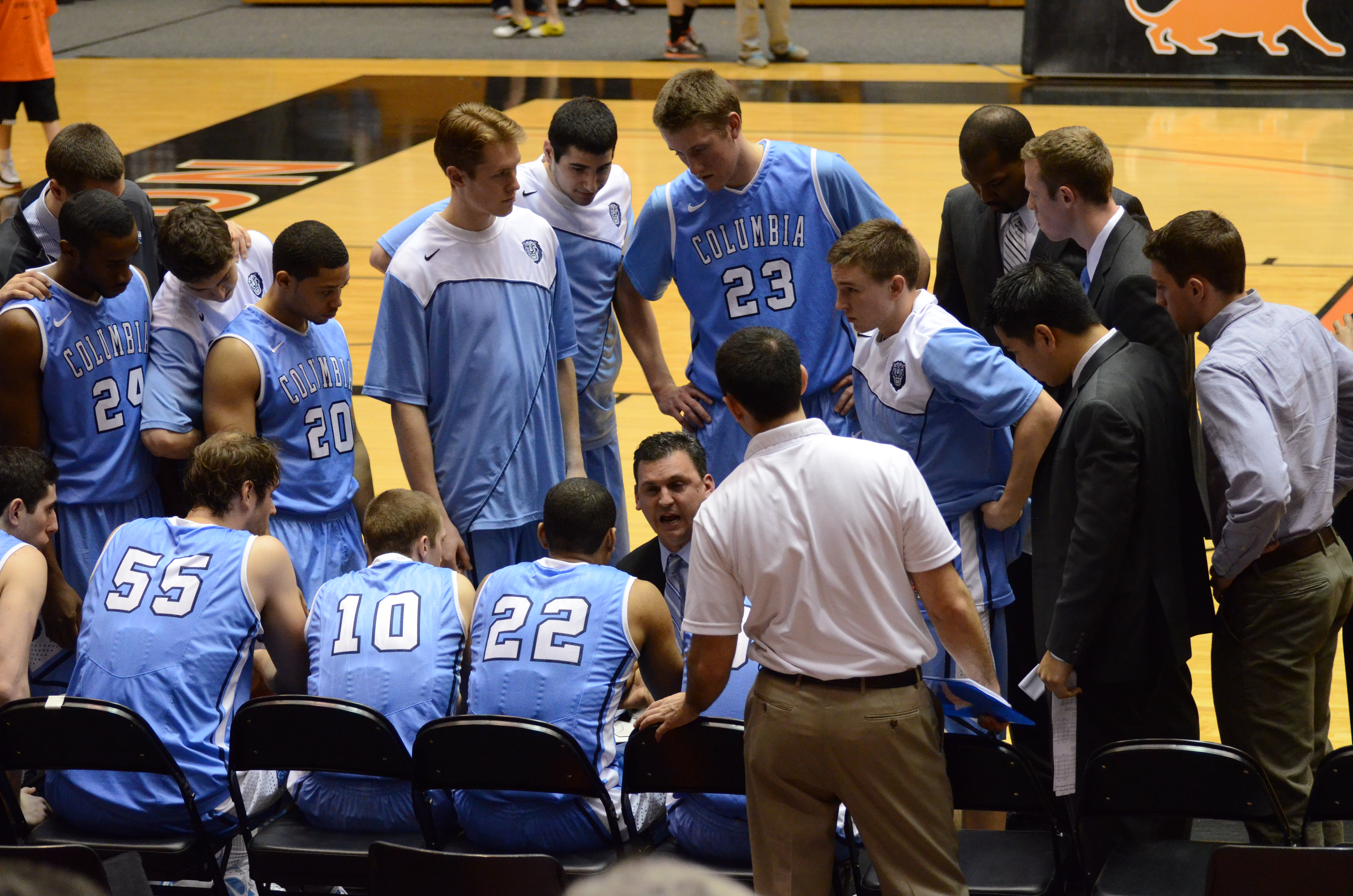
Smith coaching Columbia in 2012

Smith steered Columbia to an RPI of 186 in both 2010–11 and 2011–12, the highest finish in the program's history. Prior to his appointment at Columbia in May 2010, Smith spent 18 seasons as an assistant coach on the NCAA Division I level, including nine seasons (2001–2010) at Saint Mary's College of California, one season at the Air Force Academy (2000–01) and eight years at the University of San Diego (1992–2000).

While at Saint Mary's, he played a role in building the Gaels program into a perennial contender in the West Coast Conference. In his nine seasons with the Gaels, they made three NCAA Tournament (2005, 2008, 2010) appearances and earned one National Invitation Tournament (2009) bid. Saint Mary's averaged 23 wins over his last six seasons on the staff, including an 81–20 record over the last three seasons.

=== University of San Francisco ===
Kyle Smith was named as the head coach of University of San Francisco, on March 30, 2016. Smith led the Dons for three seasons, winning at least 20 games in each season and making two postseason appearances. At the conclusion of the 2018–2019 season, Smith left USF to take the head coaching job at Washington State.

=== Washington State ===
On March 27, 2019, Smith was named as the 19th head coach of Washington State, agreeing to a six-year contract worth $1.4 million annually. He was formally introduced at a press conference on April 1, 2019. In his first season at Washington State, Smith led the Cougars to a 6–12 conference record(16–16 overall), their best since 2011–12. In the first round of the Pac-12 tournament, Washington State beat Colorado, their first win in the conference tournament in over 10 years. In September 2021, Smith signed a contract extension through the 2026–27 season.

During the 2021–22 season, Smith led the Cougars to their first winning record in conference play (11–9) in 14 years (2007–08). The Cougars followed up their regular season success with a win in the Pac-12 tournament before losing to eventual runner-up UCLA. Following that, an NIT berth as a No. 4 seed gave the Cougs their first postseason bout in 11 years. Their first round win against Santa Clara (63–50) notched their first 20-win season since 2010–11.

During the 2023–24 season, Smith led the Cougars to their most successful season since the 2007–08 season, with a 25–10 overall record, and a 14–6 record in the Pac-12. Predicted in the preseason to finish 10th in the Pac-12, Smith and the Cougars finished second, behind Arizona. Under his leadership, the Cougars swept top-10 ranked Arizona, their first time doing so since the 2009–10 season. The Cougars beat Stanford in the first round of the Pac-12 tournament before losing to eventual runner-up Colorado. Smith helped secure the Cougars' first NCAA Tournament bid in 16 years, a remarkable turnaround for a long-struggling Cougars team. The Cougars beat Drake in the first round, and lost to Iowa State in the second. Two days after their loss to Iowa State, Smith was named the head coach at Stanford.

=== Stanford ===
On March 25, 2024, Smith was named the head coach at Stanford. The 2024–25 season is the university's first as part of the Atlantic Coast Conference.

== Head coaching record ==
Record table
Season	Team	Overall	Conference	Standing	Postseason
Columbia Lions (Ivy League) (2010–2016)
2010–11	Columbia	15–13	6–8	5th	
2011–12	Columbia	15–15	4–10	6th	
2012–13	Columbia	12–16	4–10	8th	
2013–14	Columbia	21–13	8–6	3rd	CIT Quarterfinal
2014–15	Columbia	13–15	5–9	T–5th	
2015–16	Columbia	25–10	10–4	3rd	CIT champions
Columbia:		101–82 (.552)	37–47 (.440)		
San Francisco Dons (West Coast Conference) (2016–2019)
2016–17	San Francisco	20–13	10–8	T–4th	CBI First Round
2017–18	San Francisco	22–17	9–9	T–4th	CBI Runner-Up
2018–19	San Francisco	21–10	9–7	4th	
San Francisco:		63–40 (.612)	28–24 (.538)		
Washington State Cougars (Pac-12 Conference) (2019–2024)
2019–20	Washington State	16–16	6–12	11th	
2020–21	Washington State	14–13	7–12	10th	
2021–22	Washington State	22–15	11–9	T–5th	NIT Semifinals
2022–23	Washington State	17–17	11–9	T–5th	NIT First Round
2023–24	Washington State	25–10	14–6	2nd	NCAA Division I Round of 32
Washington State:		94–71 (.570)	49–48 (.505)		
Stanford Cardinal (Atlantic Coast Conference) (2024–present)
2024–25	Stanford	21–14	11–9	7th	NIT Second Round
2025–26	Stanford	20–13	9–9	T–9th	CBC Quarterfinals
2026–27	Stanford	3–1	0–0		
Stanford:		44–28 (.611)	20–18 (.526)		
Total:		302–221 (.577)			
National champion Postseason invitational champion Conference regular season champion Conference regular season and conference tournament champion Division regular season champion Division regular season and conference tournament champion Conference tournament champion
