= 2019–20 USC Trojans men's basketball team =

American college basketball season

2019–20 USC Trojans men's basketball
- Conference: Pac-12 Conference
- Record: 22–9 (11–7 Pac-12)
- Head coach: Andy Enfield (7th season)
- Assistant coaches: Jason Hart (7th season); Chris Capko (4th season); Eric Mobley (2nd season)
- Home arena: Galen Center

2019–20 Pac-12 Conference men's basketball standings
	Conf.				Overall
Team	W		L	PCT	W		L	PCT
No. 13 Oregon	13	–	5	.722	24	–	7	.774
UCLA	12	–	6	.667	19	–	12	.613
USC	11	–	7	.611	22	–	9	.710
Arizona State	11	–	7	.611	20	–	11	.645
Arizona	10	–	8	.556	21	–	11	.656
Colorado	10	–	8	.556	21	–	11	.656
Stanford	9	–	9	.500	20	–	12	.625
Oregon State	7	–	11	.389	18	–	13	.581
Utah	7	–	11	.389	16	–	15	.516
California	7	–	11	.389	14	–	18	.438
Washington State	6	–	12	.333	16	–	16	.500
Washington	5	–	13	.278	15	–	17	.469
Note: The 2020 Pac-12 Tournament was canceled prior to the quarterfinals due to the COVID-19 pandemic. Rankings from AP poll

The 2019–20 USC Trojans men's basketball team represented the University of Southern California during the 2019–20 NCAA Division I men's basketball season. Led by seventh-year head coach Andy Enfield, they played their home games at the Galen Center in Los Angeles, California as members of the Pac-12 Conference. They finished the season 22–9, 11–7 in Pac-12 play to finish in a tie for third place. They were set to take on Arizona in the quarterfinals of the Pac-12 tournament. However, the remainder of the Pac-12 tournament, and all other postseason tournaments, were cancelled amid the COVID-19 pandemic.

== Previous season ==
The 2018–19 USC Trojans finished the season 16–17, 8–10 in Pac-12 Conference play. As the No. 8 seed in the 2019 Pac-12 Conference tournament, the Trojans defeated the No. 9 seed Arizona Wildcats in the first round before losing to the No. 1 seed Washington Huskies in the second round. The Trojans were not selected for any postseason play.

== Off-season ==
=== Departures ===
Name	Pos.	Height	Weight	Year	Hometown	Reason for Departure
Shaqquan Aaron	G	6'7"	195	RS Sr.	Seattle, WA	Graduated
Devin Fleming	G	6'2"	190	Sr.	Moreno Valley, CA	Graduated
Bennie Boatwright	F	6'10"	235	Sr.	Mission Hills, CA	Graduated
Derryck Thornton	G	6'2"	195	RS Jr.	Los Angeles, CA	Graduate transfer to Boston College
Kevin Porter Jr.	SG	6'6"	216	Fr.	Seattle, WA	Declared for 2019 NBA draft

=== Incoming transfers ===
Name	Pos.	Height	Weight	Year	Hometown	Previous School
Quinton Adlesh	G	6'0"	195	RS Sr.	Arroyo Grande, CA	Columbia
Noah Baumann	G/F	6'5"	180	Jr.	Phoenix, Arizona	San Jose State
Daniel Utomi	F	6'6"	215	RS Sr.	Houston, Texas	Akron

=== 2019 recruiting class ===
College recruiting information
Name	Hometown	School	Height	Weight	Commit date
Isaiah Mobley; PF	Murrieta, CA	Rancho Christian School	6 ft 9 in (2.06 m)	210 lb (95 kg)	May 18, 2018
Isaiah Mobley; PF	Recruit ratings: Rivals: 247Sports: ESPN: (95)				
Onyeka Okongwu; C	Chino Hills, CA	Chino Hills High School	6 ft 8 in (2.03 m)	225 lb (102 kg)	May 14, 2018
Onyeka Okongwu; C	Recruit ratings: Rivals: 247Sports: ESPN: (93)				
Max Agbonkpolo; PF	Rancho Santa Margarita, CA	Santa Margarita Catholic High School	6 ft 8 in (2.03 m)	200 lb (91 kg)	Jul 6, 2018
Max Agbonkpolo; PF	Recruit ratings: Rivals: 247Sports: ESPN: (88)				
Drake London; SG	Moorpark, CA	Moorpark High School	6 ft 5 in (1.96 m)	200 lb (91 kg)	Jun 27, 2018
Drake London; SG	Recruit ratings: Rivals: 247Sports: ESPN: (82)				
Kyle Sturdivant; PG	Norcross, GA	Norcross High School	6 ft 2 in (1.88 m)	170 lb (77 kg)	Sep 20, 2018
Kyle Sturdivant; PG	Recruit ratings: Rivals: 247Sports: ESPN: (81)				
Ethan Anderson; PG	Los Angeles, CA	Fairfax	5 ft 10 in (1.78 m)	165 lb (75 kg)	Mar 22, 2019
Ethan Anderson; PG	Recruit ratings: Rivals: 247Sports: ESPN: (79)				
Overall recruit ranking:
Note: In many cases, Scout, Rivals, 247Sports, On3, and ESPN may conflict in their listings of height and weight.; In these cases, the average was taken. ESPN grades are on a 100-point scale.; Sources: "2019 USC Commits". Rivals.; "2019 Team Ranking". Rivals.

== Roster ==
2019–20 USC Trojans men's basketball team
Players
Coaches

Pos.	#	Name	Height	Weight	Year	Previous school	Hometown
G	0	Talin Lewis (W)	6 ft 4 in (1.93 m)	180 lb (82 kg)	So	Oaks Christian	Westlake Village, CA
G	1	Kyle Sturdivant	6 ft 3 in (1.91 m)	200 lb (91 kg)	Fr	Norcross HS	Norcross, GA
G	2	Jonah Mathews	6 ft 3 in (1.91 m)	205 lb (93 kg)	Sr	Santa Monica HS	Santa Monica, CA
F	3	Elijah Weaver	6 ft 6 in (1.98 m)	210 lb (95 kg)	So	Rockledge HS	Cocoa, FL
F	4	Daniel Utomi	6 ft 6 in (1.98 m)	225 lb (102 kg)	GS	Akron	Houston, TX
G	10	Quinton Adlesh	6 ft 1 in (1.85 m)	200 lb (91 kg)	GS	Columbia	Arroyo Grande, CA
G	14	McKay Anderson (W)	6 ft 5 in (1.96 m)	190 lb (86 kg)	Sr	Pasadena City College	La Cañada, CA
C	15	Isaiah Mobley	6 ft 10 in (2.08 m)	235 lb (107 kg)	Fr	Rancho Christian School	Murrieta, CA
G	20	Ethan Anderson	6 ft 1 in (1.85 m)	210 lb (95 kg)	Fr	Fairfax HS	Los Angeles, CA
F	21	Onyeka Okongwu	6 ft 9 in (2.06 m)	245 lb (111 kg)	Fr	Chino Hills HS	Chino Hills, CA
G	22	Drake London (W)	6 ft 5 in (1.96 m)	205 lb (93 kg)	Fr	Moorpark HS	Moorpark, CA
F	23	Max Agbonkpolo	6 ft 8 in (2.03 m)	190 lb (86 kg)	Fr	Santa Margarita HS	Laguna Niguel, CA
G	30	Noah Baumann (redshirt)	6 ft 6 in (1.98 m)	215 lb (98 kg)	Jr	San Jose State	Phoenix, AZ
C	31	Nick Rakocevic	6 ft 11 in (2.11 m)	230 lb (104 kg)	Sr	St. Joseph HS	Chicago, IL

Head coach

- Andy Enfield (Johns Hopkins)

Assistant coach(es)

- Jason Hart (Syracuse)
- Chris Capko (South Florida)
- Eric Mobley (Portland)

Legend

- (C) Team captain
- (S) Suspended
- (I) Ineligible
- (W) Walk-on
- Injured
- Current redshirt

Roster
Last update: January 19, 2020

- Dec. 16, 2019 – Redshirt Sophomore forward, Charles O'Bannon Jr. elected to transfer.

== Exhibition ==
On July 31, 2019, it was announced that USC will play Villanova on October 18, 2019, in an exhibition game. The game, which did not count towards the regular season record, took place at Galen Center, USC's home arena. All proceeds went to the California Fire Foundation. It was USC's first exhibition game open to the public since 2014.

== Schedule and results ==
Date time, TV	Rank^{#}	Opponent^{#}	Result	Record	High points	High rebounds	High assists	Site (attendance) city, state
Exhibition
October 18, 2019*; 8:00 pm, P12N		Villanova; Charity Exhibition	W 72–61	–	15 – Tied	10 – Okongwu	–	Galen Center; Los Angeles, CA
Non-conference regular season
November 5, 2019*; 8:00 pm, P12N		Florida A&M	W 77–48	1–0	20 – Okongwu	13 – Okongwu	7 – Anderson	Galen Center (3,021); Los Angeles, CA
November 8, 2019*; 8:00 pm, P12N		Portland	W 76–65	2–0	20 – Okongwu	10 – Okongwu	10 – Anderson	Galen Center (2,720); Los Angeles, CA
November 12, 2019*; 7:00 pm, P12N		South Dakota State	W 84–66	3–0	27 – Rakocevic	13 – Rakocevic	4 – Weaver	Galen Center (2,210); Los Angeles, CA
November 16, 2019*; 8:00 pm, CBSSN		at Nevada	W 76–66	4–0	24 – Rakocevic	11 – Tied	8 – Anderson	Lawlor Events Center (9,833); Reno, NV
November 19, 2019*; 6:00 pm, P12N		Pepperdine	W 91–84	5–0	33 – Okongwu	11 – Rakocevic	6 – Rakocevic	Galen Center (2,139); Los Angeles, CA
November 22, 2019*; 8:00 pm, P12N		Temple; Orlando Invitational non–bracket game	L 61–70	5–1	17 – Okongwu	6 – Tied	5 – Anderson	Galen Center (3,625); Los Angeles, CA
November 28, 2019*; 1:00 pm, ESPNU		vs. Fairfield; Orlando Invitational quarterfinals	W 54–47	6–1	14 – Tied	10 – Okongwu	3 – Weaver	HP Field House (2,084); Orlando, FL
November 29, 2019*; 1:30 pm, ESPN2		vs. Marquette; Orlando Invitational semifinals	L 79–101	6–2	15 – Mobley	9 – Mobley	2 – Anderson	HP Field House (2,457); Orlando, FL
December 1, 2019*; 3:00 pm, ESPN2		vs. Harvard; Orlando Invitational 3rd place game	W 77–62	7–2	27 – Okongwu	14 – Okongwu	5 – Mathews	HP Field House (1,259); Orlando, FL
December 6, 2019*; 6:00 pm, ESPN2		vs. TCU	W 80–78	8–2	20 – Mathews	11 – Rakocevic	8 – Anderson	Dickies Arena (5,656); Fort Worth, TX
December 15, 2019*; 3:30 pm, P12N		Long Beach State	W 87–76	9–2	28 – Okongwu	12 – Okongwu	12 – Anderson	Galen Center (4,275); Los Angeles, CA
December 21, 2019*; 6:00 pm, FS1		vs. LSU; Basketball Hall of Fame Classic	W 70–68	10–2	15 – Mathews	8 – Tied	6 – Anderson	Staples Center (8,296); Los Angeles, CA
December 29, 2019*; 7:00 pm, P12N		Florida Gulf Coast	W 71–58	11–2	19 – Rakocevic	13 – Rakocevic	5 – Sturdivant	Galen Center (2,871); Los Angeles, CA
Pac-12 regular season
January 2, 2020; 7:30 pm, P12N		at Washington State	W 65–56	12–2 (1–0)	27 – Okongwu	12 – Okongwu	4 – Mathews	Beasley Coliseum (2,256); Pullman, WA
January 5, 2020; 7:00 pm, FS1		at Washington	L 40–72	12–3 (1–1)	10 – Okongwu	9 – Okongwu	1 – Tied	Alaska Airlines Arena (8,774); Seattle, WA
January 11, 2020; 7:00 pm, ESPN2		at UCLA; Rivalry	W 74–63	13–3 (2–1)	17 – Rakocevic	14 – Rakocevic	3 – Tied	Pauley Pavilion (13,659); Los Angeles, CA
January 16, 2020; 7:30 pm, P12N		California	W 88–56	14–3 (3–1)	19 – Mathews	8 – Okongwu	4 – Tied	Galen Center (4,312); Los Angeles, CA
January 18, 2020; 3:30 pm, P12N		Stanford	W 82–78 ^{OT}	15–3 (4–1)	22 – Okongwu	9 – Okongwu	4 – Anderson	Galen Center (5,017); Los Angeles, CA
January 23, 2020; 8:00 pm, ESPNU		at No. 12 Oregon	L 70–79 ^{2OT}	15–4 (4–2)	23 – Okongwu	14 – Okongwu	4 – Anderson	Matthew Knight Arena (7,497); Eugene, OR
January 25, 2020; 2:00 pm, P12N		at Oregon State	W 75–55	16–4 (5–2)	18 – Okongwu	8 – Okongwu	6 – Anderson	Gill Coliseum (6,526); Corvallis, OR
January 30, 2020; 6:30 pm, FS1		Utah	W 56–52	17–4 (6–2)	16 – Rakocevic	15 – Rakocevic	3 – Anderson	Galen Center (4,478); Los Angeles, CA
February 1, 2020; 7:30 pm, FS1		No. 20 Colorado	L 57–78	17–5 (6–3)	12 – Mobley	10 – Okongwu	4 – Anderson	Galen Center (5,736); Los Angeles, CA
February 6, 2020; 6:00 pm, ESPN2		at No. 23 Arizona	L 80–85	17–6 (6–4)	23 – Okongwu	8 – Okongwu	4 – Adlesh	McKale Center (13,816); Tucson, AZ
February 8, 2020; 7:00 pm, FS1		at Arizona State	L 64–66	17–7 (6–5)	22 – Mathews	12 – Rakocevic	3 – Anderson	Desert Financial Arena (9,628); Tempe, AZ
February 13, 2020; 6:00 pm, ESPN2		Washington	W 62–56	18–7 (7–5)	19 – Rakocevic	9 – Rakocevic	4 – Tied	Galen Center (4,765); Los Angeles, CA
February 15, 2020; 5:00 pm, P12N		Washington State	W 70–51	19–7 (8–5)	23 – Utomi	11 – Mobley	5 – Anderson	Galen Center (4,057); Los Angeles, CA
February 20, 2020; 6:00 pm, ESPN2		at No. 18 Colorado	L 66–70	19–8 (8–6)	21 – Okongwu	11 – Rakocevic	4 – Weaver	CU Events Center (10,027); Boulder, CO
February 23, 2020; 3:00 pm, ESPNU		at Utah	L 65–79	19–9 (8–7)	18 – Okongwu	12 – Okongwu	3 – Utomi	Jon M. Huntsman Center (9,765); Salt Lake City, UT
February 27, 2020; 6:00 pm, ESPN		Arizona	W 57–48	20–9 (9–7)	14 – Mathews	10 – Okongwu	3 – Weaver	Galen Center (4,121); Los Angeles, CA
February 29, 2020; 5:00 pm, ESPNU		Arizona State	W 71–61	21–9 (10–7)	23 – Mathews	10 – Utomi	3 – Tied	Galen Center (4,786); Los Angeles, CA
March 7, 2020; 12:15 pm, CBS		UCLA; Rivalry	W 54–52	22–9 (11–7)	19 – Mathews	7 – Rakocevic	7 – Anderson	Galen Center (7,622); Los Angeles, CA
Pac-12 tournament
March 12, 2020; 2:30 pm, P12N	(4)	vs. (5) Arizona; Quarterfinals	Cancelled due to the COVID-19 pandemic					T-Mobile Arena; Paradise, NV
*Non-conference game. ^{#}Rankings from AP Poll. (#) Tournament seedings in parentheses. All times are in Pacific Time.
