= 2019–20 Oregon State Beavers men's basketball team =

American college basketball season

2019–20 Oregon State Beavers men's basketball
- Conference: Pac-12 Conference
- Record: 18–13 (7–11 Pac-12)
- Head coach: Wayne Tinkle (6th season)
- Associate head coach: Kerry Rupp (6th season)
- Assistant coaches: Stephen Thompson (6th season); Marlon Stewart (1st season)
- Home arena: Gill Coliseum

2019–20 Pac-12 Conference men's basketball standings
	Conf.				Overall
Team	W		L	PCT	W		L	PCT
No. 13 Oregon	13	–	5	.722	24	–	7	.774
UCLA	12	–	6	.667	19	–	12	.613
USC	11	–	7	.611	22	–	9	.710
Arizona State	11	–	7	.611	20	–	11	.645
Arizona	10	–	8	.556	21	–	11	.656
Colorado	10	–	8	.556	21	–	11	.656
Stanford	9	–	9	.500	20	–	12	.625
Oregon State	7	–	11	.389	18	–	13	.581
Utah	7	–	11	.389	16	–	15	.516
California	7	–	11	.389	14	–	18	.438
Washington State	6	–	12	.333	16	–	16	.500
Washington	5	–	13	.278	15	–	17	.469
Note: The 2020 Pac-12 Tournament was canceled prior to the quarterfinals due to the COVID-19 pandemic. Rankings from AP poll

The 2019–20 Oregon State Beavers men's basketball team represented Oregon State University in the 2019–20 NCAA Division I men's basketball season. The Beavers were led by sixth-year head coach Wayne Tinkle, and played their home games at Gill Coliseum in Corvallis, Oregon as members of the Pac-12 Conference. They finished the season 18–13, 7–11 in Pac-12 play to finish in a three-way tie for eighth place. They defeated Utah in the first round of the Pac-12 tournament and were set to take on rival Oregon in the quarterfinals before the remainder of the Pac-12 Tournament was cancelled amid the COVID-19 pandemic.

== Previous season ==
The 2017–18 Beavers finished the 2018–19 season 18–13, 10–8 in Pac-12 play to finish in a three-way tie for fourth place. They lost in the quarterfinals of the Pac-12 tournament to Colorado. Despite having 18 wins and a better record, they failed to get an invitation to the National Invitation Tournament, and were also ruled out of the College Basketball Invitational.

== Off-season ==
=== Departures ===
Name	Num	Pos.	Height	Weight	Year	Hometown	Reason for departure
Jordan Campbell	0	G	6'3"	195	Freshman	Adelanto, CA	Mid-season transferred to Fresno State
Stephen Thompson Jr.	1	G	6'4"	190	Senior	Los Angeles, CA	Graduated
Kye Blaser	2	G	6'3"	180	Freshman	Newport, OR	Transferred to Linn–Benton CC
Jack Wilson	14	C	7'0"	255	Freshman	Half Moon Bay, CA	Mid-season transferred to Idaho
Warren Washington	22	F	6'11"	210	Freshman	San Marcos, CA	Transferred to Nevada
Gligorije Rakocevic	23	C	6'11"	255	Senior	Bijelo Polje, Montenegro	Graduated

=== Incoming transfers ===
Name	Num	Pos.	Height	Weight	Year	Hometown	Previous school
Sean Miller-Moore	1	G	6'5"		Junior	Toronto, ON	Junior college transferred from Moberly Area CC
Roman Silva	12	C	7'1"	265	RS junior	Pomona, CA	Junior college transferred from San Bernardino Valley College
Joey Potts	23	C	6'10"	200	Junior	Petaluma, CA	Junior college transferred from College of Marin. Will join the team as a walk-on.

=== 2019 recruiting class ===
College recruiting
Name	Hometown	School	Height	Weight	Commit date
Jarod Lucas; PG	Hacienda Heights, CA	Los Altos High School	6 ft 3 in (1.91 m)	170 lb (77 kg)	Nov 14, 2018
Jarod Lucas; PG	Recruit ratings: Scout: Rivals: 247Sports: ESPN: (81)				
Gianni Hunt; PG	Torrance, CA	Bishop Montgomery High School	6 ft 2 in (1.88 m)	170 lb (77 kg)	Aug 7, 2018
Gianni Hunt; PG	Recruit ratings: Scout: Rivals: 247Sports: ESPN: (79)				
Dearon Tucker; C	Dallas, TX	Skyline High School	6 ft 9 in (2.06 m)	N/A	Jun 28, 2019
Dearon Tucker; C	Recruit ratings: Scout: Rivals: 247Sports: ESPN: (77)				
Julien Franklin; SG	Villa Park, CA	Villa Park High School	6 ft 4 in (1.93 m)	160 lb (73 kg)	Jan 6, 2018
Julien Franklin; SG	Recruit ratings: Scout: Rivals: 247Sports: ESPN: (NR)				
Overall recruit ranking:
Note: In many cases, Scout, Rivals, 247Sports, On3, and ESPN may conflict in their listings of height and weight.; In these cases, the average was taken. ESPN grades are on a 100-point scale.; Sources: "2019 Basketball Player Commits". ESPN.; "2019 Team Ranking". Rivals.

== Roster ==
2019–20 Oregon State Beavers men's basketball team
Players
Coaches

Pos.	#	Name	Height	Weight	Year	Previous school	Hometown
G	0	Gianni Hunt	6 ft 3 in (1.91 m)	180 lb (82 kg)	Fr	Bishop Montgomery HS	Lakewood, California
G	1	Sean Miller-Moore	6 ft 5 in (1.96 m)	200 lb (91 kg)	Jr	Moberly Area CC	Toronto, Ontario
G	2	Jarod Lucas	6 ft 3 in (1.91 m)	195 lb (88 kg)	Fr	Los Altos HS	Hacienda Heights, California
F	3	Tres Tinkle	6 ft 7 in (2.01 m)	225 lb (102 kg)	RS Sr	Hellgate HS	Missoula, Montana
F	4	Alfred Hollins	6 ft 6 in (1.98 m)	205 lb (93 kg)	Jr	Hillcrest Prep	San Francisco, California
G	5	Ethan Thompson	6 ft 5 in (1.96 m)	195 lb (88 kg)	Jr	Bishop Montgomery HS	Los Angeles, California
G	11	Zach Reichle	6 ft 5 in (1.96 m)	205 lb (93 kg)	Jr	Wilsonville HS	Wilsonville, Oregon
C	12	Roman Silva	7 ft 1 in (2.16 m)	220 lb (100 kg)	RS Jr	San Bernardino Valley College	Rancho Cucamonga, California
G	13	Antoine Vernon	6 ft 0 in (1.83 m)	175 lb (79 kg)	So	The Rise Centre Academy	Hamilton, Ontario
C	15	Payton Dastrup	6 ft 10 in (2.08 m)	240 lb (109 kg)	RS Jr	BYU	Mesa, Arizona
G	22	Julien Franklin	6 ft 7 in (2.01 m)	200 lb (91 kg)	Fr	Villa Park HS	Brea, California
F	23	Joey Potts (W)	6 ft 10 in (2.08 m)	200 lb (91 kg)	Jr	College of Marin	Petaluma, California
F	24	Kylor Kelley	7 ft 0 in (2.13 m)	215 lb (98 kg)	RS Sr	Lane CC	Gervais, Oregon
F	35	DeAron Tucker	6 ft 10 in (2.08 m)	240 lb (109 kg)	Fr	Legacy Early College	Dallas, Texas
F	44	Isaac Barnes (W)	6 ft 8 in (2.03 m)	225 lb (102 kg)	Jr	North Allegheny HS	Pittsburgh, Pennsylvania

Head coach

- Wayne Tinkle (Montana)

Assistant coach(es)

- Kerry Rupp (Southern Utah)
- Stephen Thompson (Syracuse)
- Marlon Stewart (North Dakota)

Legend

- (C) Team captain
- (S) Suspended
- (I) Ineligible
- (W) Walk-on
- Injured
- Current redshirt

Roster

== Schedule and results ==
Date time, TV	Rank^{#}	Opponent^{#}	Result	Record	High points	High rebounds	High assists	Site (attendance) city, state
Exhibition
October 23, 2019*; 7:00 pm		Carroll College	W 79–60	–	16 – Kelley	–	–	Gill Coliseum; Corvallis, OR
October 29, 2019*; 7:00 pm		Warner Pacific	W 96–45	–	19 – Tinkle	10 – Miller-Moore	5 – Miller-Moore	Gill Coliseum (3,249); Corvallis, OR
Non-conference regular season
November 5, 2019*; 8:00 pm, P12N		Cal State Northridge	W 87–67	1–0	25 – Tinkle	10 – Tinkle	7 – Tinkle	Gill Coliseum (3,422); Corvallis, OR
November 9, 2019*; 1:30 pm, P12N		Iowa State	W 80–74	2–0	27 – Tinkle	11 – Tinkle	9 – Thompson	Gill Coliseum (6,173); Corvallis, OR
November 12, 2019*; 8:30 pm, ESPN2		vs. Oklahoma; Phil Knight Invitational	L 69–77	2–1	18 – Tinkle	10 – Tinkle	5 – Tied	Moda Center (7,246); Portland, OR
November 16, 2019*; 6:00 pm, Stadium		at Wyoming	W 83–63	3–1	16 – Tinkle	9 – Tinkle	3 – Tinkle	Arena-Auditorium (4,339); Laramie, WY
November 20, 2019*; 7:00 pm, P12N		UC Santa Barbara; Las Vegas Classic	W 78–67	4–1	27 – Tinkle	11 – Tinkle	3 – 3 tied	Gill Coliseum (3,553); Corvallis, OR
November 23, 2019*; 11:30 am, P12N		Grambling State; Las Vegas Classic	W 80–58	5–1	22 – Kelly	8 – Thompson	6 – Tinkle	Gill Coliseum (3,670); Corvallis, OR
November 27, 2019*; 8:00 pm, FS1		vs. San Jose State; Las Vegas Classic	W 83–48	6–1	17 – Thompson	6 – Hollins	4 – Tied	Orleans Arena (1,500); Paradise, NV
December 1, 2019*; 3:00 pm, P12N		Portland State; Las Vegas Classic	W 81–76	7–1	26 – Tinkle	9 – Tinkle	7 – Tinkle	Gill Coliseum (3,765); Corvallis, OR
December 14, 2019*; 3:00 pm, P12N		Arkansas–Pine Bluff	W 80–46	8–1	26 – Tinkle	6 – Tied	5 – Thompson	Gill Coliseum (3,946); Corvallis, OR
December 18, 2019*; 2:30 pm, ESPN3		vs. UTSA; The Battleground 2K19	W 88–78	9–1	23 – Tied	6 – Tied	6 – Reichle	Toyota Center (712); Houston, TX
December 21, 2019*; 5:30 pm, SECN		at Texas A&M	L 49–64	9–2	21 – Tinkle	6 – Thompson	5 – Thompson	Reed Arena (7,303); College Station, TX
December 29, 2019*; 3:00 pm, P12N		North Dakota	W 83–66	10–2	25 – Thompson	7 – Tinkle	8 – Thompson	Gill Coliseum (4,364); Corvallis, OR
Pac-12 regular season
January 2, 2020; 5:30 pm, P12N		at Utah	L 69–81	10–3 (0–1)	19 – Tinkle	10 – Kelley	3 – Thompson	Jon M. Huntsman Center (9,579); Salt Lake City, UT
January 5, 2020; 3:00 pm, ESPNU		at Colorado	W 76–68	11–3 (1–1)	24 – Thompson	9 – Thompson	5 – Thompson	CU Events Center (7,309); Boulder, CO
January 9, 2020; 8:00 pm, ESPNU		Arizona State	L 76–82	11–4 (1–2)	22 – Tied	6 – Tied	3 – Tied	Gill Coliseum (4,828); Corvallis, OR
January 12, 2020; 7:00 pm, FS1		No. 24 Arizona	W 82–65	12–4 (2–2)	20 – Tinkle	6 – Tied	8 – Thompson	Gill Coliseum (4,911); Corvallis, OR
January 16, 2020; 8:00 pm, FS1		at Washington	L 56–64	12–5 (2–3)	16 – Kelley	8 – Tinkle	6 – Thompson	Alaska Airlines Arena (8,207); Seattle, WA
January 18, 2020; 1:00 pm, P12N		at Washington State	L 76–89	12–6 (2–4)	22 – Tinkle	8 – Tinkle	3 – Tied	Beasley Coliseum (10,380); Pullman, WA
January 23, 2020; 8:00 pm, FS1		UCLA	L 58–62	12–7 (2–5)	17 – Tinkle	8 – Tinkle	4 – Tinkle	Gill Coliseum (4,073); Corvallis, OR
January 25, 2020; 2:00 pm, P12N		USC	L 55–75	12–8 (2–6)	17 – Tinkle	5 – Tied	3 – Tied	Gill Coliseum (6,526); Corvallis, OR
January 30, 2020; 8:00 pm, P12N		at Stanford	W 68–63	13–8 (3–6)	21 – Lucas	6 – Kelley	4 – Tinkle	Maples Pavilion (2,820); Stanford, CA
February 1, 2020; 1:00 pm, P12N		at California	L 67–69	13–9 (3–7)	19 – Tinkle	8 – Kelley	3 – Reichle	Haas Pavilion (6,322); Berkeley, CA
February 8, 2020; 7:30 pm, P12N		No. 14 Oregon; Civil War	W 63–53	14–9 (4–7)	15 – Thompson	7 – Kelley	5 – Tinkle	Gill Coliseum (9,301); Corvallis, OR
February 13, 2020; 6:00 pm, P12N		Utah	W 70–51	15–9 (5–7)	16 – Kelley	9 – Kelley	11 – Thompson	Gill Coliseum (4,118); Corvallis, OR
February 15, 2020; 7:00 pm, FS1		No. 16 Colorado	L 47–69	15–10 (5–8)	17 – Thompson	13 – Tinkle	4 – Thompson	Gill Coliseum (4,953); Corvallis, OR
February 20, 2020; 5:00 pm, P12N		at No. 24 Arizona	L 63-89	15–11 (5–9)	18 – Lucas	8 – Kelley	6 – Thompson	McKale Center (13,555); Tucson, AZ
February 22, 2020; 5:00 pm, ESPNU		at Arizona State	L 73–74	15–12 (5–10)	25 – Tinkle	9 – Tinkle	7 – Thompson	Desert Financial Arena (9,688); Tempe, AZ
February 27, 2020; 8:00 pm, ESPN2		at No. 14 Oregon; Civil War	L 54–69	15–13 (5–11)	15 – Thompson	10 – Tinkle	6 – Thompson	Matthew Knight Arena (10,098); Eugene, OR
March 5, 2020; 6:00 pm, P12N		Stanford	W 68–65	16–13 (6–11)	23 – Tinkle	7 – Kelley	5 – Thompson	Gill Coliseum (3,718); Corvallis, OR
March 7, 2020; 1:30 pm, P12N		California	W 74–56	17–13 (7–11)	24 – Tinkle	9 – Reichle	6 – Reichte	Gill Coliseum (4,545); Corvallis, OR
Pac-12 tournament
March 11, 2020; 12:00 pm, P12N	(8)	vs. (9) Utah; First round	W 71–69	18–13	19 – Tinkle	5 – Thompson	5 – Tied	T-Mobile Arena (8,048); Paradise, NV
March 12, 2020; 12:00 pm, P12N	(8)	vs. (1) No. 13 Oregon; Quarterfinals/Civil War	Cancelled due to the COVID-19 pandemic					T-Mobile Arena; Paradise, NV
*Non-conference game. ^{#}Rankings from AP Poll. (#) Tournament seedings in parentheses. All times are in Pacific Time.
