= 2019–20 California Golden Bears men's basketball team =

American college basketball season

2019–20 California Golden Bears men's basketball
- Conference: Pac-12 Conference
- Record: 14–18 (7–11 Pac–12)
- Head coach: Mark Fox (1st season)
- Assistant coaches: Andrew Francis; Chris Harriman; Marty Wilson
- Home arena: Haas Pavilion (Capacity: 11,877)

2019–20 Pac-12 Conference men's basketball standings
	Conf.				Overall
Team	W		L	PCT	W		L	PCT
No. 13 Oregon	13	–	5	.722	24	–	7	.774
UCLA	12	–	6	.667	19	–	12	.613
USC	11	–	7	.611	22	–	9	.710
Arizona State	11	–	7	.611	20	–	11	.645
Arizona	10	–	8	.556	21	–	11	.656
Colorado	10	–	8	.556	21	–	11	.656
Stanford	9	–	9	.500	20	–	12	.625
Oregon State	7	–	11	.389	18	–	13	.581
Utah	7	–	11	.389	16	–	15	.516
California	7	–	11	.389	14	–	18	.438
Washington State	6	–	12	.333	16	–	16	.500
Washington	5	–	13	.278	15	–	17	.469
Note: The 2020 Pac-12 Tournament was canceled prior to the quarterfinals due to the COVID-19 pandemic. Rankings from AP poll

The 2019–20 California Golden Bears men's basketball team represented the University of California, Berkeley in the 2019–20 NCAA Division I men's basketball season. This was Mark Fox's first year as head coach at California. The Golden Bears played their home games at Haas Pavilion as members of the Pac-12 Conference. They finished the season 14–18, 7–11 in Pac-12 play to finish in a three-way tie for eighth place. They defeated Stanford in the first round of the Pac-12 tournament and were set to take on UCLA in the quarterfinals before the remainder of the Pac-12 Tournament was cancelled amid the COVID-19 pandemic.

== Previous season ==
The Golden Bears finished the 2018–19 season with a record of 8–23, 3–15 in Pac-12 play to finish in last place. They lost in the first round of the Pac-12 tournament to Colorado.

On March 24, Wyking Jones was fired. He finished with a two-year record of 16–47 overall and 5–31 in the Pac-12. Former Georgia and Nevada head coach Fox was hired on March 29.

== Off-season ==
=== Departures ===
Name	Num	Pos.	Height	Weight	Year	Hometown	Reason for departure
Darius McNeill	1	G	6'3"	182	Sophomore	Houston, TX	Transferred to SMU
Justice Sueing	10	F	6'7"	215	Sophomore	Honolulu, HI	Transferred to Ohio State
Roman Davis	15	F	6'7"	210	RS junior	Carson, CA	Transferred
Connor Vanover	23	F/C	7'3"	225	Freshman	Little Rock, AR	Transferred to Arkansas
James Zhao	35	G	6'3"	184	Freshman	Beijing, China	Walk-on; left the team for personal reasons

=== Incoming transfers ===
Name	Num	Pos.	Height	Weight	Year	Hometown	Previous school
Kareem South	10	G	6'2"	185	RS Senior	Toronto, ON	Transferred from Texas A&M–Corpus Christi. Was eligible to play immediately, since he graduated from Texas A&M–Corpus Christi.

=== 2019 recruiting class ===
College recruiting
Name	Hometown	School	Height	Weight	Commit date
Joel Brown; PG	Toronto, ON	Brewster Academy	6 ft 2 in (1.88 m)	175 lb (79 kg)	Oct 2, 2018
Joel Brown; PG	Recruit ratings: Scout: Rivals: 247Sports: ESPN:				
D. J. Thorpe; C	Austin, TX	Lake Travis High School	6 ft 9 in (2.06 m)	210 lb (95 kg)	Sep 21, 2018
D. J. Thorpe; C	Recruit ratings: Scout: Rivals: 247Sports: ESPN:				
Dimitris Klonaras; SG	Thessaloniki, Greece	PAOK B.C.	6 ft 6 in (1.98 m)	205 lb (93 kg)	
Dimitris Klonaras; SG	Recruit ratings: Scout: Rivals: 247Sports: ESPN:				
Lars Thiemann; C	Leverkusen, Germany	Bayern Giants Leverkusen	6 ft 11 in (2.11 m)	N/A	
Lars Thiemann; C	Recruit ratings: Scout: Rivals: 247Sports: ESPN:				
Kuany Kuany; PF	Melbourne, Australia	Prolific Prep	6 ft 9 in (2.06 m)	200 lb (91 kg)	May 9, 2019
Kuany Kuany; PF	Recruit ratings: Scout: Rivals: 247Sports: ESPN:				
Overall recruit ranking:
Note: In many cases, Scout, Rivals, 247Sports, On3, and ESPN may conflict in their listings of height and weight.; In these cases, the average was taken. ESPN grades are on a 100-point scale.; Sources: "2019 California Commits". Rivals.; "2019 Team Ranking". Rivals.

=== 2020 recruiting class ===
College recruiting (2020)
Name	Hometown	School	Height	Weight	Commit date
Monty Bowser; PF	Oakland, CA	Bishop O'Dowd High School	6 ft 6 in (1.98 m)	190 lb (86 kg)	Oct 9, 2019
Monty Bowser; PF	Recruit ratings: Scout: Rivals: 247Sports: ESPN:				
Jalen Celestine; SG	Brookville, NY	Long Island Lutheran High School	6 ft 6 in (1.98 m)	185 lb (84 kg)	Nov 5, 2019
Jalen Celestine; SG	Recruit ratings: Scout: Rivals: 247Sports: ESPN:				
Overall recruit ranking:
Note: In many cases, Scout, Rivals, 247Sports, On3, and ESPN may conflict in their listings of height and weight.; In these cases, the average was taken. ESPN grades are on a 100-point scale.; Sources: "2020 California Commits". Rivals.; "2020 Team Ranking". Rivals.

== Roster ==
2019–20 California Golden Bears men's basketball team
Players
Coaches

Pos.	#	Name	Height	Weight	Year	Previous school	Hometown
G	0	Jacob Orender (W)	5 ft 11 in (1.8 m)	178 lb (81 kg)	RS Sr	Lafayette	Jacksonville Beach, Florida
G	1	Joel Brown	6 ft 2 in (1.88 m)	192 lb (87 kg)	Fr	Brewster Academy	Brampton, Ontario
G	2	Juhwan Harris-Dyson	6 ft 6 in (1.98 m)	204 lb (93 kg)	Jr	Heritage Christian	Northridge, California
G	3	Paris Austin	6 ft 0 in (1.83 m)	190 lb (86 kg)	RS Sr	Boise State	Oakland, California
G	10	Kareem South	6 ft 3 in (1.91 m)	185 lb (84 kg)	RS Sr	Texas A&M–Corpus Christi	Toronto, Ontario
F	12	Kuany Kuany	6 ft 9 in (2.06 m)	194 lb (88 kg)	Fr	Prolific Prep	Melbourne, Australia
F	13	Jules Erving (W)	6 ft 5 in (1.96 m)	208 lb (94 kg)	Jr	Holy Innocents' Episcopal School	Atlanta, Georgia
F	15	Grant Anticevich	6 ft 8 in (2.03 m)	230 lb (104 kg)	Jr	Newington College	Sydney, Australia
G	20	Matt Bradley	6 ft 4 in (1.93 m)	220 lb (100 kg)	So	Wasatch Academy	San Bernardino, California
F/C	21	Lars Thiemann	7 ft 0 in (2.13 m)	248 lb (112 kg)	Fr	Bayer Giants U19	Krefeld, Germany
F	22	Andre Kelly	6 ft 8 in (2.03 m)	255 lb (116 kg)	So	Lincoln HS	Stockton, California
G	23	David Serge (W)	6 ft 4 in (1.93 m)	185 lb (84 kg)	Sr	Oaks Christian	Newbury Park, California
F	24	Jacobi Gordon	6 ft 7 in (2.01 m)	216 lb (98 kg)	So	Aspire Academy	Houston, Texas
G	25	Logan Alters	6 ft 1 in (1.85 m)	175 lb (79 kg)	Fr	NSU University School	Miami, Florida
F	33	D. J. Thorpe	6 ft 8 in (2.03 m)	235 lb (107 kg)	Fr	Lake Travis HS	Lake Travis, Texas
G	34	Dimitrios Klonaras	6 ft 6 in (1.98 m)	215 lb (98 kg)	Fr	P.A.O.K. BC	Thessaloniki, Greece
F	42	Blake Welle (W)	6 ft 7 in (2.01 m)	213 lb (97 kg)	So	Aptos HS	Santa Cruz, California

Head coach

- Mark Fox (Eastern New Mexico)

Assistant coach(es)

- Andrew Francis (Villanova)
- Chris Harriman (Augusta State)
- Marty Wilson (Pepperdine)

Legend

- (C) Team captain
- (S) Suspended
- (I) Ineligible
- (W) Walk-on
- Injured
- Current redshirt

Roster

== Schedule and results ==
Date time, TV	Rank^{#}	Opponent^{#}	Result	Record	High points	High rebounds	High assists	Site (attendance) city, state
Exhibition
October 30, 2019*; 7:00 pm		Saint Martin's	W 98–75		23 – South	7 – Kelly	7 – Austin	Haas Pavilion (1,278); Berkeley, CA
Non-conference regular season
November 5, 2019*; 7:00 pm, P12N		Pepperdine	W 87–71	1–0	25 – Bradley	10 – Tied	3 – 3 Tied	Haas Pavilion (3,780); Berkeley, CA
November 12, 2019*; 8:00 pm, P12N		UNLV	W 79–75 ^{OT}	2–0	23 – Bradley	5 – Bradley	2 – 4 Tied	Haas Pavilion (3,423); Berkeley, CA
November 15, 2019*; 7:00 pm, P12N		California Baptist; 2K Empire Classic campus-site game	W 82–62	3–0	23 – Anticevich	9 – Anticevich	4 – Tied	Haas Pavilion (4,115); Berkeley, CA
November 18, 2019*; 7:00 pm, P12N		Prairie View A&M; 2K Empire Classic campus-site game	W 54–50	4–0	16 – Bradley	6 – Anticevich	3 – Brown	Haas Pavilion (2,242); Berkeley, CA
November 21, 2019*; 6:00 pm, ESPN2		vs. No. 1 Duke; 2K Empire Classic semifinal	L 52–87	4–1	8 – South	5 – Kelly	3 – Brown	Madison Square Garden (12,606); New York, NY
November 22, 2019*; 2:00 pm, ESPN2		vs. No. 22 Texas; 2K Empire Classic 3rd place game	L 45–62	4–2	22 – Bradley	9 – Anticevich	3 – Austin	Madison Square Garden (12,500); New York, NY
November 26, 2019*; 7:00 pm, P12N		UC Davis	W 72–66	5–2	19 – Bradley	11 – Anticevich	4 – South	Haas Pavilion (3,063); Berkeley, CA
December 4, 2019*; 8:00 pm, CBSSN		at San Francisco	L 64–76	5–3	20 – South	6 – Austin	3 – Brown	The Sobrato Center (3,006); San Francisco, CA
December 7, 2019*; 2:00 pm		at Santa Clara	L 52–71	5–4	14 – Bradley	4 – Tied	3 – South	Leavey Center (2,326); Santa Clara, CA
December 11, 2019*; 7:00 pm, P12N		Fresno State	W 69–63	6–4	24 – Bradley	6 – Kelly	2 – Tied	Haas Pavilion (3,211); Berkeley, CA
December 14, 2019*; 7:30 pm, P12N		Saint Mary's	L 77–89	6–5	26 – Kelly	4 – Tied	5 – Bradley	Haas Pavilion (5,734); Berkeley, CA
December 21, 2019*; 2:30 pm, P12N		vs. Boston College; Al Attles Classic	L 60–64	6–6	21 – Bradley	9 – Tied	3 – South	Chase Center (6,209); San Francisco, CA
December 29, 2019*; 3:00 pm, P12N		Harvard	L 63–71	6–7	15 – Bradley	7 – Kelly	4 – Austin	Haas Pavilion (4,317); Berkeley, CA
Pac-12 regular season
January 2, 2020; 8:00 pm, ESPN2		at Stanford	L 52–68	6–8 (0–1)	16 – Anticevich	10 – Anticevich	2 – Brown	Maples Pavilion (3,691); Stanford, CA
January 9, 2020; 7:30 pm, P12N		Washington State	W 73–66	7–8 (1–1)	26 – Bradley	10 – Bradley	4 – Bradley	Haas Pavilion (3,953); Berkeley, CA
January 11, 2020; 5:00 pm, P12N		Washington	W 61–58 ^{OT}	8–8 (2–1)	17 – Bradley	7 – Anticevich	3 – 3 tied	Haas Pavilion (4,660); Berkeley, CA
January 16, 2020; 7:30 pm, P12N		at USC	L 56–88	8–9 (2–2)	13 – Bradley	5 – 3 tied	4 – Kelly	Galen Center (4,312); Los Angeles, CA
January 19, 2020; 5:00 pm, ESPNU		at UCLA	L 40–50	8–10 (2–3)	17 – Bradley	9 – Thorpe	4 – Kelly	Pauley Pavilion (5,970); Los Angeles, CA
January 26, 2020; 3:00 pm, ESPNU		Stanford	W 52–50	9–10 (3–3)	15 – Austin	8 – Anticevich	4 – Austin	Haas Pavilion (9,168); Berkeley, CA
January 30, 2020; 6:00 pm, P12N		No. 11 Oregon	L 72–77	9–11 (3–4)	25 – Bradley	5 – Tied	3 – Tied	Haas Pavilion (6,117); Berkeley, CA
February 1, 2020; 1:00 pm, P12N		Oregon State	W 69–67	10–11 (4–4)	23 – Bradley	11 – Anticevich	11 – Anticevich	Haas Pavilion (6,322); Berkeley, CA
February 6, 2020; 5:00 pm, P12N		at No. 24 Colorado	L 65–71	10–12 (4–5)	17 – Bradley	7 – Kelly	3 – Tied	CU Events Center (6,656); Boulder, CO
February 8, 2020; 5:00 pm, P12N		at Utah	L 45–60	10–13 (4–6)	13 – Bradley	8 – Kelly	4 – Austin	Jon M. Huntsman Center (10,766); Salt Lake City, UT
February 13, 2020; 7:30 pm, FS1		Arizona	L 52–68	10–14 (4–7)	19 – Bradley	9 – Kelly	2 – 3 tied	Haas Pavilion (6,291); Berkeley, CA
February 16, 2020; 3:00 pm, ESPNU		Arizona State	L 75–80	10–15 (4–8)	22 – Bradley	9 – Kelly	5 – Austin	Haas Pavilion (6,046); Berkeley, CA
February 19, 2020; 7:00 pm, P12N		at Washington State	W 66–57	11–15 (5–8)	19 – Austin	8 – Bradley	4 – Brown	Beasley Coliseum (2,860); Pullman, WA
February 22, 2020; 3:00 pm, P12N		at Washington	L 52–87	11–16 (5–9)	14 – Bradley	6 – Anticevich	2 – Kuany	Alaska Airlines Arena (8,873); Seattle, WA
February 27, 2020; 6:00 pm, P12N		No. 21 Colorado	W 78–62	12–16 (6–9)	26 – Bradley	6 – Bradley	4 – Anticevich	Haas Pavilion (5,134); Berkeley, CA
February 29, 2020; 3:00 pm, P12N		Utah	W 86–79 ^{OT}	13–16 (7–9)	21 – Bradley	9 – Kelly	4 – Austin	Haas Pavilion (6,420); Berkeley, CA
March 5, 2020; 5:00 pm, ESPN2		at No. 13 Oregon	L 56–90	13–17 (7–10)	15 – Bradley	7 – Kelly	3 – Austin	Matthew Knight Arena (7,651); Eugene, OR
March 7, 2020; 1:30 pm, P12N		at Oregon State	L 56–74	13–18 (7–11)	18 – Austin	10 – Kelly	5 – Austin	Gill Coliseum (4,545); Corvallis, OR
Pac-12 tournament
March 11, 2020; 6:00 pm, P12N	(10)	vs. (7) Stanford; First round	W 63–51	14–18	18 – Tied	8 – Anticevich	3 – Austin	T-Mobile Arena (7,452); Paradise, NV
March 12, 2020; 6:00 pm, P12N	(10)	vs. (2) UCLA; Quarterfinals	Cancelled due to the COVID-19 pandemic					T-Mobile Arena; Paradise, NV
*Non-conference game. ^{#}Rankings from AP Poll. (#) Tournament seedings in parentheses. All times are in Pacific Time.
