= 2019–20 Washington State Cougars men's basketball team =

American college basketball season

2019–20 Washington State Cougars men's basketball
- Conference: Pac-12 Conference
- Record: 16–16 (6–12 Pac-12)
- Head coach: Kyle Smith (1st season)
- Assistant coaches: Derrick Phelps; Jim Shaw; John Andrejek
- Home arena: Beasley Coliseum

2019–20 Pac-12 Conference men's basketball standings
	Conf.				Overall
Team	W		L	PCT	W		L	PCT
No. 13 Oregon	13	–	5	.722	24	–	7	.774
UCLA	12	–	6	.667	19	–	12	.613
USC	11	–	7	.611	22	–	9	.710
Arizona State	11	–	7	.611	20	–	11	.645
Arizona	10	–	8	.556	21	–	11	.656
Colorado	10	–	8	.556	21	–	11	.656
Stanford	9	–	9	.500	20	–	12	.625
Oregon State	7	–	11	.389	18	–	13	.581
Utah	7	–	11	.389	16	–	15	.516
California	7	–	11	.389	14	–	18	.438
Washington State	6	–	12	.333	16	–	16	.500
Washington	5	–	13	.278	15	–	17	.469
Note: The 2020 Pac-12 Tournament was canceled prior to the quarterfinals due to the COVID-19 pandemic. Rankings from AP poll

The 2019–20 Washington State Cougars men's basketball team represented Washington State University during the 2019–20 NCAA Division I men's basketball season. The team was led by first-year head coach Kyle Smith. The Cougars played their home games at the Beasley Coliseum in Pullman, Washington as members of the Pac-12 Conference. They finished the season 16–16, 6–12 in Pac-12 play to finish in 11th place. They defeated Colorado in the first round of the Pac-12 tournament and were set to face Arizona State in the quarterfinals before the remainder of the Pac-12 Tournament was cancelled amid the COVID-19 pandemic. On March 12, all other conference tournaments and postseason tournaments were cancelled, making the Cougars' win over Colorado on March 11 the final game to be completed in the 2019–20 basketball season.

== Previous season ==
The Cougars finished the 2018–19 season 11–21, 4–14 in Pac-12 play to finish in 11th place. They lost in the first round of the Pac-12 tournament to the eventual tournament champion Oregon.

At the conclusion of the season, head coach Ernie Kent was fired. On March 27, 2019, the school hired former San Francisco Dons head coach Kyle Smith as the new head coach.

== Offseason ==
=== Departures ===
Name	Pos.	Height	Weight	Year	Hometown	Reason for departure
Ahmed Ali	G	5'11"	160	Senior	Toronto, ON	Transferred to Hawaiʻi
Davante Cooper	C	6'11"	235	Senior	Atlanta, GA	Graduated
Viont'e Daniels	G	6'2"	175	Senior	Federal Way, WA	Graduated
Robert Franks	F	6'9"	225	Senior	Vancouver, WA	Graduated & 2019 NBA draft
Carter Skaggs	G	6'5"	215	Junior	Logansport, IN	Graduate transferred to UNC Wilmington
James Streeter	C	6'10"	255	Junior	Coon Rapids, MN	Transferred
Isaiah Wade	F	6'8"	210	Junior	Minneapolis, MN	Transferred

=== Incoming transfers ===
Name	Pos.	Height	Weight	Year	Hometown	Previous school
Isaac Bonton	G	6'2"	175	Junior	Portland, OR	Casper College
Daron Hansen	F	6'8"	190	Junior	Mission Hills, CA	Salt Lake Community College
Deion James	F	6'6"	220	Senior	Tucson, AZ	Colorado State University
Tony Miller	G	6'6"	215	Junior	Woodinville, WA	University of Puget Sound

=== 2019 recruiting class ===
College recruiting
Name	Hometown	School	Height	Weight	Commit date
Volodymyr Markovetskyy; C	Truskavets, Ukraine	BC Žalgiris-2	7 ft 0 in (2.13 m)	230 lb (100 kg)	May 15, 2019
Volodymyr Markovetskyy; C	Recruit ratings: Scout: Rivals: 247Sports: ESPN:				
Ryan Rapp; G	Melbourne, Victoria, Australia	Mazenod College	6 ft 5 in (1.96 m)	180 lb (82 kg)	May 3, 2019
Ryan Rapp; G	Recruit ratings: Scout: Rivals: 247Sports: ESPN:				
DJ Rodman; F	San Juan Capistrano, CA	JSerra Catholic High School	6 ft 6 in (1.98 m)	190 lb (86 kg)	May 18, 2019
DJ Rodman; F	Recruit ratings: Scout: Rivals: 247Sports: ESPN:				
Noah Williams; G	Seattle, WA	O'Dea High School	6 ft 4 in (1.93 m)	174 lb (79 kg)	May 9, 2019
Noah Williams; G	Recruit ratings: Scout: Rivals: 247Sports: ESPN:				
Overall recruit ranking:
Note: In many cases, Scout, Rivals, 247Sports, On3, and ESPN may conflict in their listings of height and weight.; In these cases, the average was taken. ESPN grades are on a 100-point scale.; Sources: "2019 Washington State Commits". Rivals.; "Men's Basketball Recruiting". Scout.; "ESPN- Washington State Cougars Men's Basketball Recruiting". ESPN.; "Scout.com Team Recruiting Rankings". Scout.; "2019 Team Ranking". Rivals.

== Roster ==
2019–20 Washington State Cougars men's basketball team
Players
Coaches

Pos.	#	Name	Height	Weight	Year	Previous school	Hometown
G	0	Carter Sonneborn (W)	6 ft 3 in (1.91 m)	190 lb (86 kg)	Fr	Gonzaga Prep	Spokane, WA
G	1	Jervae Robinson	6 ft 2 in (1.88 m)	185 lb (84 kg)	Sr	Otero JC	Aurora, CO
F	2	C. J. Elleby	6 ft 6 in (1.98 m)	200 lb (91 kg)	So	Cleveland HS	Seattle, WA
F	3	Daron Henson	6 ft 7 in (2.01 m)	210 lb (95 kg)	Jr	Salt Lake CC	Pasadena, CA
F	4	Aljaz Kunc	6 ft 8 in (2.03 m)	198 lb (90 kg)	So	Impact Academy-FLA	Ljubljana, Slovenia
F	5	Marvin Cannon	6 ft 5 in (1.96 m)	170 lb (77 kg)	Jr	Barton CC	Richmond, VA
G	10	Isaac Bonton	6 ft 3 in (1.91 m)	185 lb (84 kg)	Jr	Casper College	Portland, OR
F	11	DJ Rodman (W)	6 ft 6 in (1.98 m)	190 lb (86 kg)	Fr	JSerra Catholic HS	Newport Beach, CA
F	13	Jeff Pollard	6 ft 9 in (2.06 m)	240 lb (109 kg)	Sr	Impact Academy	Bountiful, UT
C	15	Volodymyr Markovetskyy	7 ft 1 in (2.16 m)	230 lb (104 kg)	Fr	Kaunas A. Puškinas	Truskavets, Ukraine
F	20	Deion James	6 ft 6 in (1.98 m)	220 lb (100 kg)	GS	Colorado State	Tucson, AZ
G	22	Ryan Rapp	6 ft 5 in (1.96 m)	172 lb (78 kg)	Fr	Mazenod College	Melbourne, Australia
G	24	Noah Williams	6 ft 5 in (1.96 m)	192 lb (87 kg)	Fr	O'Dea HS	Seattle, WA
F	32	Tony Miller (W)	6 ft 6 in (1.98 m)	210 lb (95 kg)	RS Jr	Montana	Woodinville, WA
F	33	Brandon Chatfield (W)	6 ft 10 in (2.08 m)	210 lb (95 kg)	Fr	Clarkston HS	Clarkston, WA

Head coach

- Kyle Smith (Hamilton)

Assistant coach(es)

- Derrick Phelps (North Carolina)
- Jim Shaw (Western Oregon)
- John Andrejek (Columbia)

Legend

- (C) Team captain
- (S) Suspended
- (I) Ineligible
- (W) Walk-on
- Injured
- Current redshirt

Roster
Last update: 09/05/2019

== Schedule and results ==
Date time, TV	Rank^{#}	Opponent^{#}	Result	Record	Site (attendance) city, state
Non-conference regular season
November 7, 2019*; 6:00 pm, P12N		Seattle	W 85–54	1–0	Beasley Coliseum (2,810); Pullman, WA
November 12, 2019*; 7:00 pm		at Santa Clara	L 62–70	1–1	Leavey Center (1,202); Santa Clara, CA
November 17, 2019*; 1:00 pm, P12N		Idaho State	W 72–61	2–1	Beasley Coliseum (2,704); Pullman, WA
November 21, 2019*; 4:00 pm, P12N		Omaha; Cayman Islands Classic campus-site game	L 77–85	2–2	Beasley Coliseum (2,204); Pullman, WA
November 25, 2019*; 4:30 pm, FloSports		vs. Nebraska; Cayman Islands Classic Quarterfinals	L 71–82	2–3	John Gray Gymnasium (660); George Town, Cayman Islands
November 26, 2019*; 2:00 pm		vs. Old Dominion; Cayman Islands Classic Consolation 2nd Round	W 66–50	3–3	John Gray Gymnasium (406); George Town, Cayman Islands
November 27, 2019*; 10:30 am		vs. Colorado State; Cayman Islands Classic 5th place game	L 69–79	3–4	John Gray Gymnasium (1,023); George Town, Cayman Islands
December 4, 2019*; 7:00 pm		at Idaho; Battle of the Palouse	W 78–65	4–4	Cowan Spectrum (1,316); Moscow, ID
December 7, 2019*; 12:00 pm, P12N		vs. New Mexico State	W 63–54	5–4	Spokane Arena (1,222); Spokane, WA
December 15, 2019*; 1:30 pm, P12N		UC Riverside	W 70–56	6–4	Beasley Coliseum (1,995); Pullman, WA
December 19, 2019*; 7:30 pm, P12N		Florida A&M	W 87–73	7–4	Beasley Coliseum (1,987); Pullman, WA
December 21, 2019*; 4:00 pm, P12N		Incarnate Word	W 87–59	8–4	Beasley Coliseum (2,037); Pullman, WA
December 29, 2019*; 5:00 pm, P12N		Arkansas–Pine Bluff	W 65–50	9–4	Beasley Coliseum (2,122); Pullman, WA
Pac-12 regular season
January 2, 2020; 7:30 pm, P12N		USC	L 56–65	9–5 (0–1)	Beasley Coliseum (2,256); Pullman, WA
January 5, 2020; 4:00 pm, P12N		UCLA	W 79–71	10–5 (1–1)	Beasley Coliseum (2,825); Pullman, WA
January 9, 2020; 7:30 pm, P12N		at California	L 66–73	10–6 (1–2)	Haas Pavilion (3,953); Berkeley, CA
January 11, 2020; 3:00 pm, P12N		at Stanford	L 62–88	10–7 (1–3)	Maples Pavilion (3,526); Stanford, CA
January 16, 2020; 6:30 pm, FS1		No. 8 Oregon	W 72–61	11–7 (2–3)	Beasley Coliseum (3,082); Pullman, WA
January 18, 2020; 1:00 pm, P12N		Oregon State	W 89–76	12–7 (3–3)	Beasley Coliseum (10,380); Pullman, WA
January 23, 2020; 7:00 pm, P12N		at No. 23 Colorado	L 56–78	12–8 (3–4)	CU Events Center (7,864); Boulder, CO
January 25, 2020; 4:00 pm, P12N		at Utah	L 64–76	12–9 (3–5)	Jon M. Huntsman Center (9,807); Salt Lake City, UT
January 29, 2020; 8:00 pm, ESPNU		Arizona State	W 67–65	13–9 (4–5)	Beasley Coliseum (2,811); Pullman, WA
February 1, 2020; 5:00 pm, P12N		Arizona	L 49–66	13–10 (4–6)	Beasley Coliseum (4,032); Pullman, WA
February 9, 2020; 2:00 pm, ESPNU		Washington; Rivalry	W 79–67	14–10 (5–6)	Beasley Coliseum (4,866); Pullman, WA
February 13, 2020; 8:00 pm, P12N		at UCLA	L 83–86 ^{OT}	14–11 (5–7)	Pauley Pavilion (5,125); Los Angeles, CA
February 15, 2020; 5:00 pm, P12N		at USC	L 51–70	14–12 (5–8)	Galen Center (4,057); Los Angeles, CA
February 19, 2020; 7:00 pm, P12N		California	L 57–66	14–13 (5–9)	Beasley Coliseum (2,860); Pullman, WA
February 23, 2020; 3:00 pm, ESPNU		Stanford	L 57–75	14–14 (5–10)	Beasley Coliseum (3,618); Pullman, WA
February 28, 2020; 6:00 pm, FS1		at Washington; Rivalry	W 78–74	15–14 (6–10)	Alaska Airlines Arena (9,131); Seattle, WA
March 5, 2020; 7:30 pm, FS1		at Arizona	L 62–83	15–15 (6–11)	McKale Center (13,052); Tucson, AZ
March 7, 2020; 3:30 pm, P12N		at Arizona State	L 74–83	15–16 (6–12)	Desert Financial Arena (8,829); Tempe, AZ
Pac-12 Tournament
March 11, 2020; 8:30 pm, P12N	(11)	vs. (6) Colorado; First round	W 82–68	16–16	T-Mobile Arena (7,452); Paradise, NV
March 12, 2020; 8:30 pm, FS1	(11)	vs. (3) Arizona State; Quarterfinals	Cancelled due to the COVID-19 pandemic		T-Mobile Arena; Paradise, NV
*Non-conference game. ^{#}Rankings from AP Poll. (#) Tournament seedings in parentheses. All times are in Pacific Time.
