= Tres Tinkle =

American basketball player (born 1996)

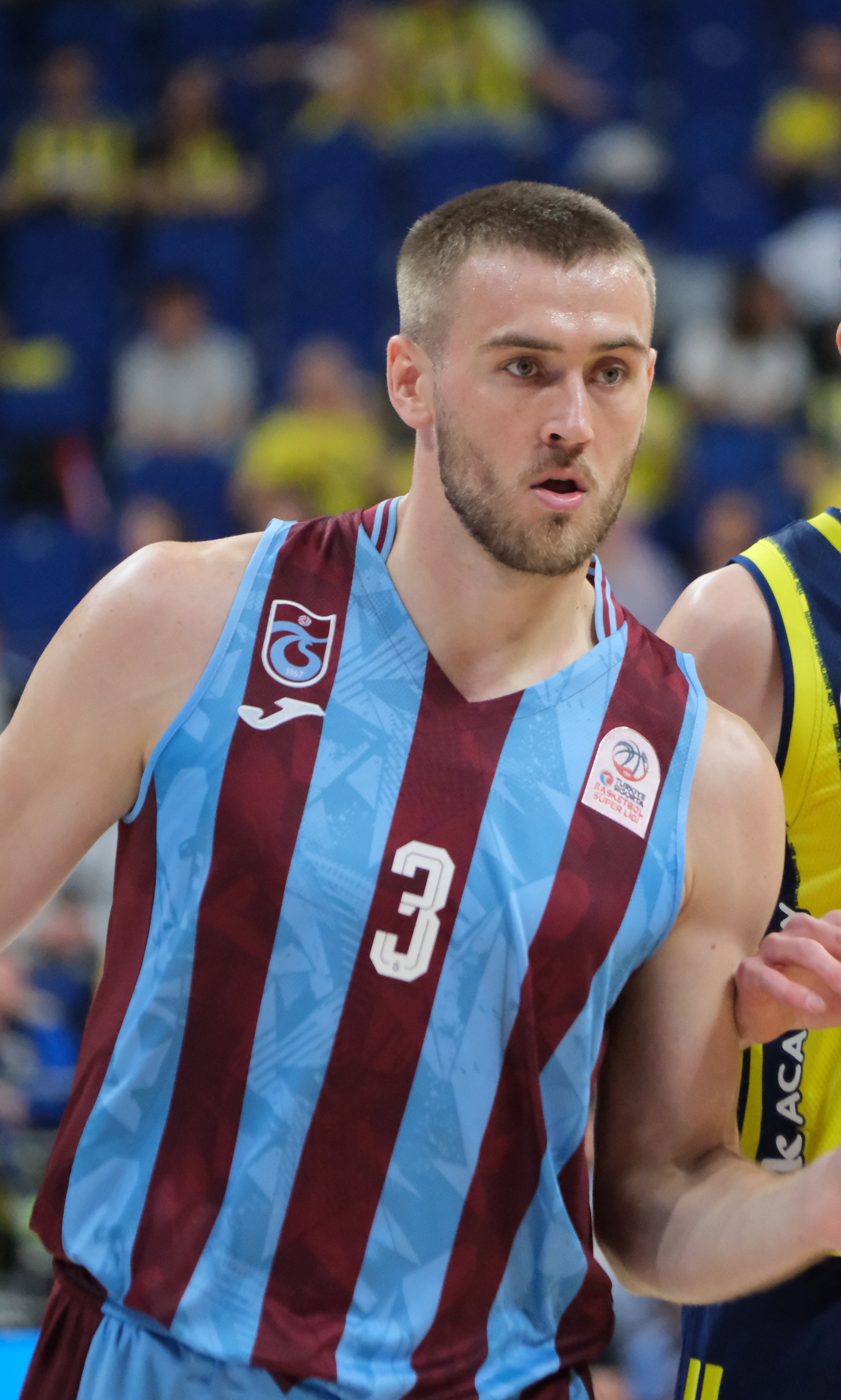
- Tinkle with Trabzonspor in 2026

Free Agent
- Position: Small forward / power forward

Personal information
- Born: June 3, 1996 (age 30) Missoula, Montana, U.S.
- Listed height: 2.03 m (6 ft 8 in)
- Listed weight: 102 kg (225 lb)

Career information
- High school: Hellgate (Missoula, Montana)
- College: Oregon State (2015–2020)
- NBA draft: 2020: undrafted
- Playing career: 2021–present

Career history
- 2021: Raptors 905
- 2021–2022: Vanoli Cremona
- 2022–2023: Le Mans
- 2023–2024: Monbus Obradoiro
- 2024–2025: Darüşşafaka
- 2025–2026: Trabzonspor

Career highlights
- 3× First-team All-Pac-12 (2018–2020)
- Stats at NBA.com
- Stats at Basketball Reference

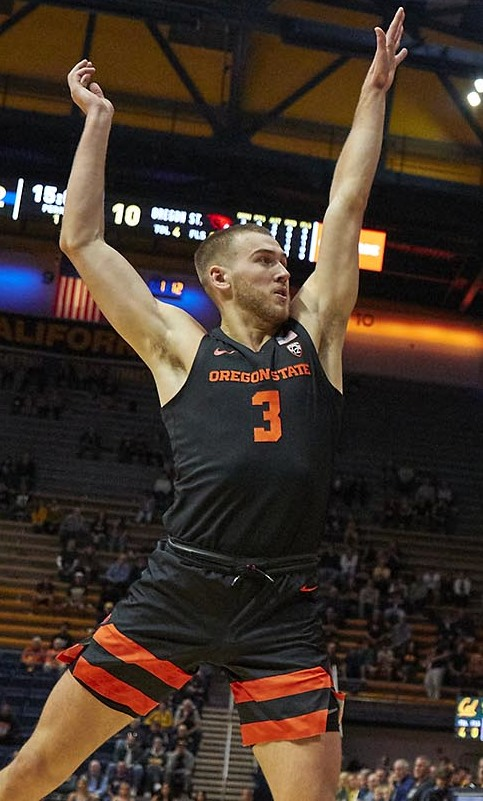
Tinkle with Oregon State in 2020

Tres Anthony Tinkle (born June 3, 1996) is an American professional basketball player who last played for Trabzonspor of the Basketbol Süper Ligi (BSL). He played college basketball for the Oregon State Beavers.

== Early life ==
Tinkle was born in Missoula, Montana to Lisa and Wayne Tinkle on June 3, 1996. He played high school basketball at Hellgate High School for coach Jeff Hays, lettering all four years. He averaged over 20 points and 7 rebounds his sophomore, junior, and senior years, finishing his high school career with a school-record of 1,580 points. He led the team to the 2013 Class AA state championship as a sophomore, the state title game as a junior, and third place as a senior. He was named First Team All-State and All-Western Conference all four years and was named Gatorade Montana Boys' Basketball Player of the Year in 2014 and 2015. He also played AAU basketball with Anthony Davis Idaho Select and Earl Watson Elite.

Tinkle attended the Nike EYBL, NBA Top 100 Camp, Kevin Durant Skills Academy and the LeBron James Skills Academy. A consensus four-star recruit, he was ranked 91st overall by ESPN, 82nd overall by 247Sports, 88th overall by Scout and 93rd overall by Rivals.

== College career ==
As a freshman, Tinkle played in 27 games, starting 11, before missing the final five games with a right foot injury. He averaged 13.1 points, 5.4 rebounds, 1.1 assists, 1.2 steals and 0.5 blocked shots in 27.7 minutes per game, earning a Pac-12 All-Freshman Honorable Mention. As a sophomore, Tinkle started six games, averaging 20.2 points before being sidelined for the rest of the season with a broken right wrist. Tinkle met the requirements for a medical redshirt, and regained his year of eligibility.

Tinkle averaged 17.6 points and 7.2 rebounds per game as a redshirt sophomore as Oregon State finished 16–16. As a redshirt junior, Tinkle averaged 20.8 points, 8.1 rebounds and 3.8 assists per game, helping the Beavers finish 18–13 overall and 10–8 in the Pac-12 — their best in-league record since 1990. He considered jumping to the pros after the season, but came back to Oregon State for his final year.

Tinkle scored his 2,000th career point on January 18, 2020, in a loss to Washington State, becoming the 16th Pac-12 player in history to surpass the milestone. Tinkle shot 9 for 20 from the field and scored 22 points as well as collecting eight rebounds as the Beavers fell to the Cougars 89–76. At the conclusion of the regular season, Tinkle was named the first-team All-Pac-12 for the third consecutive season.

== Professional career ==
After going undrafted in the 2020 NBA draft, Tinkle signed an Exhibit 10 contract with the Los Angeles Lakers. He was waived by the Lakers on December 15. On December 19, he was signed and immediately waived by the Toronto Raptors for the purpose of joining their G-League team, Raptors 905, as an affiliate player.

On August 18, 2021, Tinkle signed with Vanoli Cremona of the Italian Lega Basket Serie A (LBA).

On June 14, 2022, Tinkle signed with Le Mans of the French LNB Pro A.

On August 5, 2023, he signed with Monbus Obradoiro of the Spanish Liga ACB.

On September 1, 2024, he signed with Darüşşafaka of the Basketbol Süper Ligi (BSL).

On July 8, 2025, he signed with Trabzonspor of the Basketbol Süper Ligi (BSL).

== Career statistics ==
Legend
GP	Games played	GS	Games started	MPG	Minutes per game
FG%	Field goal percentage	3P%	3-point field goal percentage	FT%	Free throw percentage
RPG	Rebounds per game	APG	Assists per game	SPG	Steals per game
BPG	Blocks per game	PPG	Points per game	**Bold**	Career high

=== College ===
Year	Team	GP	GS	MPG	FG%	3P%	FT%	RPG	APG	SPG	BPG	PPG
2015–16	Oregon State	27	11	27.7	.441	**.363**	.735	5.4	1.1	1.2	.5	13.1
2016–17	Oregon State	6	6	34.8	.444	.160	.776	**8.3**	2.3	**2.2**	**.8**	20.2
2017–18	Oregon State	**32**	**32**	36.4	.472	.327	**.840**	7.2	3.7	1.4	.6	17.6
2018–19	Oregon State	30	30	**36.5**	**.482**	.329	.770	8.1	**3.8**	1.7	.5	**20.8**
2019–20	Oregon State	31	31	34.5	.440	.345	.810	6.8	3.2	1.7	.5	18.5
Career		126	110	34.0	.460	.330	.788	7.0	3.0	1.6	.5	17.7

== Personal life ==
Tinkle's father, Wayne, is the current Men's Basketball Coach at Oregon State. His mother Lisa formerly played basketball at the University of Montana. He has two sisters, Joslyn, who played professionally for the Seattle Storm and the Sydney Uni Flames professional women's basketball team, and Elle, formerly a member of the Gonzaga Bulldogs women's basketball team. He chose to go to Oregon State to play basketball under his dad. His favorite athlete is Dwyane Wade. Tinkle graduated high school with a 3.9 GPA and is majoring in University Exploratory Studies.
