= Oregon Ducks men's basketball statistical leaders =

The Oregon Ducks men's basketball statistical leaders are individual statistical leaders of the Oregon Ducks men's basketball program in various categories, including points, assists, blocks, rebounds, and steals. Within those areas, the lists identify single-game, single-season, and career leaders. As of the next college basketball season in 2024–25, the Ducks represent the University of Oregon in the NCAA Division I Big Ten Conference.

Oregon began competing in intercollegiate basketball in 1902. However, the school's record book does not generally list records from before the 1950s, as records from before this period are often incomplete and inconsistent. Since scoring was much lower in this era, and teams played much fewer games during a typical season, it is likely that few or no players from this era would appear on these lists anyway.

The NCAA did not officially record assists as a stat until the 1983–84 season, and blocks and steals until the 1985–86 season, but Oregon's record books includes players in these stats before these seasons. These lists are updated through the end of the 2020–21 season.

== Scoring ==
Career
Rk	Player	Points	Seasons
1	Ron Lee	2,085	1972–73 1973–74 1974–75 1975–76
2	Luke Jackson	1,970	2000–01 2001–02 2002–03 2003–04
3	Anthony Taylor	1,939	1984–85 1985–86 1986–87 1987–88
4	Payton Pritchard	1,938	2016–17 2017–18 2018–19 2019–20
5	Greg Ballard	1,829	1973–74 1974–75 1975–76 1976–77
6	Tajuan Porter	1,803	2006–07 2007–08 2008–09 2009–10
7	Orlando Williams	1,674	1991–92 1992–93 1993–94 1994–95
8	Stan Love	1,644	1968–69 1969–70 1970–71
	Fred Jones	1,644	1998–99 1999–00 2000–01 2001–02
	Malik Hairston	1,644	2004–05 2005–06 2006–07 2007–08

Season
Rk	Player	Points	Season
1	Terrell Brandon	745	1990–91
	Joseph Young	745	2014–15
3	Luke Jackson	656	2003–04
4	Fred Jones	650	2001–02
5	Luke Ridnour	649	2002–03
6	Joseph Young	643	2013–14
7	Stan Love	639	1970–71
8	Dillon Brooks	635	2015–16
	Payton Pritchard	635	2019–20
10	Greg Ballard	629	1976–77

Single game
Rk	Player	Points	Season	Opponent
1	Greg Ballard	43	1976–77	Oral Roberts
2	Luke Jackson	42	2003–04	Arizona
3	Ron Lee	41	1975–76	Seattle
	Greg Ballard	41	1976–77	California
5	Stan Love	40	1969–70	California
	Greg Ballard	40	1976–77	Oregon State
	Orlando Williams	40	1993–94	Washington State
	Jermaine Couisnard	40	2023–24	South Carolina
	Luke Jackson	40	2003–04	Colorado
10	Luke Jackson	39	2003–04	Oregon State
	Jermaine Couisnard	39	2023–24	Arizona

== Rebounds ==
Career
Rk	Player	Rebounds	Seasons
1	Greg Ballard	1,114	1973–74 1974–75 1975–76 1976–77
2	Maarty Leunen	903	2004–05 2005–06 2006–07 2007–08
3	Chet Noe	890	1950–51 1951–52 1952–53
4	Max Anderson	860	1953–54 1954–55 1955–56
5	Jim Loscutoff	846	1950–51 1954–55
6	Stan Love	818	1968–69 1969–70 1970–71
7	Charlie Franklin	747	1955–56 1956–57 1957–58
8	Luke Jackson	746	2000–01 2001–02 2002–03 2003–04
9	N'Faly Dante	733	2019–20 2020–21 2021–22 2022–23 2023–24
10	Charlie Warren	730	1959–60 1960–61 1961–62

Season
Rk	Player	Rebounds	Season
1	Bob Peterson	465	1951–52
2	Jim Loscutoff	448	1954–55
3	Chet Noe	410	1952–53
4	Jim Loscutoff	398	1950–51
5	Chet Noe	377	1951–52
6	Arsalan Kazemi	350	2012–13
7	Jordan Bell	342	2016–17
8	Max Anderson	315	1955–56
9	Greg Ballard	313	1975–76
10	Maarty Leunen	304	2006–07

Single game
Rk	Player	Rebounds	Season	Opponent
1	Jim Loscutoff	32	1954–55	Brigham Young

== Assists ==
Career
Rk	Player	Assists	Seasons
1	Payton Pritchard	659	2016–17 2017–18 2018–19 2019–20
2	Kenya Wilkins	614	1993–94 1994–95 1995–96 1996–97
3	Ron Lee	572	1972–73 1973–74 1974–75 1975–76
4	Will Richardson	504	2018–19 2019–20 2020–21 2021–22 2022–23
5	Luke Ridnour	500	2000–01 2001–02 2002–03
6	Aaron Brooks	471	2003–04 2004–05 2005–06 2006–07
7	Johnathan Loyd	458	2010–11 2011–12 2012–13 2013–14
8	Luke Jackson	424	2000–01 2001–02 2002–03 2003–04
9	Fred Jones	367	1998–99 1999–00 2000–01 2001–02
10	Terrell Brandon	315	1989–90 1990–91

Season
Rk	Player	Assists	Season
1	Luke Ridnour	218	2002–03
2	Ron Lee	184	1975–76
3	Luke Ridnour	176	2001–02
4	Payton Pritchard	175	2018–19
5	Terrell Brandon	174	1989–90
6	Kenya Wilkins	172	1995–96
	Payton Pritchard	172	2019–20
8	Kenya Wilkins	171	1994–95
	Payton Pritchard	171	2017–18
10	Will Richardson	168	2022–23

Single game
Rk	Player	Assists	Season	Opponent
1	Ron Lee	17	1974–75	Villanova
2	Johnathan Loyd	15	2013–14	Mississippi
3	Terrell Brandon	13	1989–90	Portland
	Andre Collier	13	1992–93	UCLA
	Darius Wright	13	1998–99	Arizona
	Malcolm Armstead	13	2010–11	Oregon State
	Johnathan Loyd	13	2013–14	Pacific
	Payton Pritchard	13	2016–17	Savannah State
9	David Girley	12	1986–87	Washington
	Kenya Wilkins	12	1995–96	USC
	Luke Jackson	12	2003–04	Arizona State
	Malcolm Armstead	12	2009–10	UCLA
	Will Richardson	12	2022–23	Portland

== Steals ==
Career
Rk	Player	Steals	Seasons
1	Kenya Wilkins	213	1993–94 1994–95 1995–96 1996–97
2	Payton Pritchard	211	2016–17 2017–18 2018–19 2019–20
3	Will Richardson	190	2018–19 2019–20 2020–21 2021–22 2022–23
4	Luke Jackson	160	2000–01 2001–02 2002–03 2003–04
5	Malcolm Armstead	154	2009–10 2010–11
6	Johnathan Loyd	152	2010–11 2011–12 2012–13 2013–14
7	Luke Ridnour	150	2000–01 2001–02 2002–03
8	Fred Jones	148	1998–99 1999–00 2000–01 2001–02
9	Anthony Taylor	147	1984–85 1985–86 1986–87 1987–88
10	Aaron Brooks	127	2003–04 2004–05 2005–06 2006–07

Season
Rk	Player	Steals	Season
1	Malcolm Armstead	89	2010–11
2	Arsalan Kazemi	71	2012–13
3	Payton Pritchard	68	2018–19
4	Malcolm Armstead	65	2009–10
5	Terrell Brandon	63	1990–91
	Fred Jones	63	2001–02
	Luke Ridnour	63	2002–03
8	TJ Bamba	62	2024–25
9	Kenya Wilkins	61	1995–96
10	Luke Ridnour	58	2001–02

Single game
Rk	Player	Steals	Season	Opponent
1	Kenya Wilkins	9	1996–97	Boise State
2	Ron Lee	8	1975–76	UNC-Charlotte
	Terrell Brandon	8	1990–91	Arizona State
4	Ron Lee	6	1975–76	Hawaii
	Ron Lee	6	1975–76	San Jose State
	Darius Wright	6	1998–99	USC
	Malcolm Armstead	6	2010–11	Washington
	Mike Moser	6	2013–14	Georgetown
	Joseph Young	6	2013–14	USC
	Payton Pritchard	6	2018–19	Washington State
	Chris Duarte	6	2020–21	Utah

== Blocks ==
Career
Rk	Player	Blocks	Seasons
1	Jordan Bell	235	2014–15 2015–16 2016–17
2	Chris Boucher	189	2015–16 2016–17
3	Nate Bittle	176	2021–22 2022–23 2023–24 2024–25 2025–26
4	Kenny Wooten	166	2017–18 2018–19
5	N'Faly Dante	131	2019–20 2020–21 2021–22 2022–23 2023–24
6	Blair Rasmussen	116	1981–82 1982–83 1983–84 1984–85
7	Kwame Evans Jr.	95	2023–24 2024–25 2025–26
8	Bob Fife	93	1989–90 1990–91 1992–93
9	Tony Woods	91	2011–12 2012–13
10	Chris Christoffersen	75	1998–99 1999–00 2000–01 2001–02

Season
Rk	Player	Blocks	Season
1	Chris Boucher	110	2015–16
2	Jordan Bell	94	2014–15
3	Kenny Wooten	92	2017–18
4	Jordan Bell	88	2016–17
5	Chris Boucher	79	2016–17
6	Nate Bittle	75	2024–25
7	Kenny Wooten	74	2018–19
8	Jordan Bell	53	2015–16
9	Tony Woods	51	2011–12
10	Nate Bittle	46	2025–26

Single game
Rk	Player	Blocks	Season	Opponent
1	Chris Boucher	9	2015–16	Arkansas State
2	Blair Rasmussen	8	1984–85	Davidson
	Jordan Bell	8	2014–15	Arizona State
	Jordan Bell	8	2016–17	Kansas
5	Chris Boucher	7	2015–16	Arizona State
	Kenny Wooten	7	2017–18	Washington
	Kenny Wooten	7	2018–19	Stanford
	Kenny Wooten	7	2018–19	UC Irvine
