= 2020–21 Oregon Ducks men's basketball team =

American college basketball season

2020–21 Oregon Ducks men's basketball

Pac-12 regular season champions

NCAA tournament, Sweet Sixteen
- Conference: Pac-12 Conference

Ranking
- Coaches: No. 17
- Record: 21–7 (14–4 Pac-12)
- Head coach: Dana Altman (11th season)
- Assistant coaches: Kevin McKenna; Tony Stubblefield; Mike Mennenga
- Home arena: Matthew Knight Arena

2020–21 Pac-12 Conference men's basketball standings
| | Conf. | | | | Overall |
| Team | W | | L | PCT | W | | L | PCT |
|---|---|---|---|---|---|---|---|---|
| Oregon | 14 | – | 4 | .778 | 21 | – | 7 | .750 |
| No. 23 USC | 15 | – | 5 | .750 | 25 | – | 8 | .758 |
| No. 22 Colorado | 14 | – | 6 | .700 | 23 | – | 9 | .719 |
| UCLA | 13 | – | 6 | .684 | 22 | – | 10 | .688 |
| Arizona* | 11 | – | 9 | .550 | 17 | – | 9 | .654 |
| Oregon State † | 10 | – | 10 | .500 | 20 | – | 13 | .606 |
| Stanford | 10 | – | 10 | .500 | 14 | – | 13 | .519 |
| Utah | 8 | – | 11 | .421 | 12 | – | 13 | .480 |
| Arizona State | 7 | – | 10 | .412 | 11 | – | 14 | .440 |
| Washington State | 7 | – | 12 | .368 | 14 | – | 13 | .519 |
| Washington | 4 | – | 16 | .200 | 5 | – | 21 | .192 |
| California | 3 | – | 17 | .150 | 9 | – | 20 | .310 |
† Conference tournament winner *Ineligible for the conference and NCAA tournaments due to self-imposed postseason ban. Rankings from AP poll

The 2020–21 Oregon Ducks men's basketball team represented the University of Oregon during the 2020–21 NCAA Division I men's basketball season. The Ducks, led by 11th-year head coach Dana Altman, played their home games at Matthew Knight Arena as members of the Pac–12 Conference. They finished the season 21-7, 14-4 in Pac-12 Play to finish as regular season champions. They defeated Arizona State in the quarterfinals of the Pac-12 tournament before losing in the semifinals to Oregon State. They received an at-large bid to the NCAA tournament, where they advanced to the second round due to a positive COVID-19 test from VCU. They defeated Iowa in the second round to advance to the Sweet Sixteen, where they lost to USC.

== Previous season ==
The Ducks finished the season 24–7, 13–5 in Pac-12 play to win the regular season Pac-12 championship. They were set to take on rival Oregon State in the quarterfinals of the Pac-12 tournament. However, the Pac-12 Tournament, along with all postseason tournaments, was cancelled amid the COVID-19 pandemic.

== Off-season ==
=== Departures ===
Oregon departures
| Name | Number | Pos. | Height | Weight | Year | Hometown | Reason for departure |
|---|---|---|---|---|---|---|---|
| Payton Pritchard | 3 | G | 6'2" | 190 | Senior | West Linn, OR | Graduated/2020 NBA draft |
| Shakur Juiston | 10 | F | 6'7" | 225 | RS senior | Paterson, NJ | Graduated |
| C. J. Walker | 14 | F | 6'8" | 200 | Freshman | Sanford, FL | Transferred to UCF |
| Addison Patterson | 22 | G | 6'6" | 195 | Freshman | Milton, ON | Transferred to Nevada |
| Anthony Mathis | 32 | G | 6'4" | 185 | RS senior | West Linn, OR | Graduated/Signed to play professionally in Greece with Charilaos Trikoupis |
| Francis Okoro | 33 | F | 6'9" | 235 | Sophomore | Imo, Nigeria | Transferred to Saint Louis |

=== Incoming transfers ===
Oregon incoming transfers
| Name | Number | Pos. | Height | Weight | Year | Hometown | Notes |
|---|---|---|---|---|---|---|---|
| Amauri Hardy | 11 | G | 6'2" | 190 | Senior | Farmington Hills, MI | Transferred from UNLV. Was eligible to play immediately since Hardy graduated from UNLV, and had two years of eligibility due to an NCAA ruling that the 2020–21 season would not be counted against athletic eligibility. His younger brother is Jaden Hardy. |
| Aaron Estrada | 24 | G | 6'4" | 207 | Sophomore | Woodbury, NJ | Transferred from Saint Peter's. Under NCAA transfer rules, he had to redshirt the 2020–21 season. Because he was redshirting the 2020–21 season, he was not covered by the aforementioned NCAA ruling. |
| L. J. Figueroa | 30 | G/F | 6'6" | 200 | Senior | Lawrence, MA | Transferred from St. John's. Was eligible to play immediately since he graduated from St. John's, and had two years of eligibility due to the aforementioned NCAA ruling. |

=== 2020 recruiting class ===
College recruiting
| Name | Hometown | School | Height | Weight | Commit date |
|---|---|---|---|---|---|
| Jalen Terry; PG | Flint, MI | Beecher (MI) | 6 ft 1 in (1.85 m) | 160 lb (73 kg) | Jan 18, 2020 |
| Jalen Terry; PG | Recruit ratings: Scout: Rivals: 247Sports: ESPN: (82) | | | | |
| Franck Kepnang; C | Yaoundé, Cameroon | Westtown School (PA) | 6 ft 11 in (2.11 m) | 247 lb (112 kg) | Oct 10, 2020 |
| Franck Kepnang; C | Recruit ratings: Scout: Rivals: 247Sports: ESPN: (89) | | | | |
Overall recruit ranking: Rivals: 68 247Sports: 47
Note: In many cases, Scout, Rivals, 247Sports, On3, and ESPN may conflict in their listings of height and weight.; In these cases, the average was taken. ESPN grades are on a 100-point scale.; Sources:

=== 2021 recruiting class ===
College recruiting (2021)
| Name | Hometown | School | Height | Weight | Commit date |
|---|---|---|---|---|---|
| Nathan Bittle #2 C | Central Point, OR | Prolific Prep | 6 ft 11 in (2.11 m) | 200 lb (91 kg) | Sep 15, 2020 |
| Nathan Bittle #2 C | Recruit ratings: Scout: Rivals: 247Sports: ESPN: (94) | | | | |
| Johnathan Lawson #19 SF | West Chester, PA | Westtown School | 6 ft 6 in (1.98 m) | 165 lb (75 kg) | Oct 7, 2020 |
| Johnathan Lawson #19 SF | Recruit ratings: Scout: Rivals: 247Sports: ESPN: (84) | | | | |
Overall recruit ranking: Rivals: 30 247Sports: 37
Note: In many cases, Scout, Rivals, 247Sports, On3, and ESPN may conflict in their listings of height and weight.; In these cases, the average was taken. ESPN grades are on a 100-point scale.; Sources:

== Roster ==
2020–21 Oregon Ducks men's basketball team
Players
Coaches

| Pos. | # | Name | Height | Weight | Year | Previous school | Hometown |
|---|---|---|---|---|---|---|---|
| G | 0 | Will Richardson | 6 ft 5 in (1.96 m) | 180 lb (82 kg) | Jr | Oak Hill Academy | Hinesville, Georgia |
| C | 1 | N'Faly Dante (injured) | 6 ft 11 in (2.11 m) | 230 lb (104 kg) | So | Sunrise Christian Academy | Bamako, Mali |
| F | 2 | Eugene Omoruyi | 6 ft 6 in (1.98 m) | 235 lb (107 kg) | RS Sr | Rutgers | Rexdale, Ontario |
| G | 3 | Jalen Terry | 6 ft 0 in (1.83 m) | 165 lb (75 kg) | Fr | Beecher HS | Flint, Michigan |
| G | 4 | Eddy Ionescu (W) | 6 ft 6 in (1.98 m) | 190 lb (86 kg) | RS Sr | City College of San Francisco | Walnut Creek, California |
| G | 5 | Chris Duarte | 6 ft 6 in (1.98 m) | 190 lb (86 kg) | Sr | Northwest Florida State College | Puerto Plata, Dominican Republic |
| G | 10 | Gabe Reichle (W) | 6 ft 2 in (1.88 m) | 175 lb (79 kg) | Fr | Wilsonville HS | Wilsonville, Oregon |
| G | 11 | Amauri Hardy | 6 ft 2 in (1.88 m) | 190 lb (86 kg) | Sr | UNLV | Detroit, Michigan |
| G/F | 12 | L. J. Figueroa | 6 ft 6 in (1.98 m) | 200 lb (91 kg) | Sr | St. John's | Lawrence, Massachusetts |
| F | 13 | Chandler Lawson | 6 ft 8 in (2.03 m) | 205 lb (93 kg) | So | Wooddale HS | Memphis, Tennessee |
| F | 15 | Lök Wur | 6 ft 8 in (2.03 m) | 200 lb (91 kg) | RS Fr | Papillion-La Vista South HS | Omaha, Nebraska |
| C | 22 | Franck Kepnang | 6 ft 11 in (2.11 m) | 250 lb (113 kg) | Fr | Westtown School | Yaoundé, Cameroon |
| G | 24 | Aaron Estrada (redshirt) | 6 ft 4 in (1.93 m) | 207 lb (94 kg) | So | Saint Peter's | Woodbury, New Jersey |
| G | 25 | Luke Osborn (W) | 6 ft 6 in (1.98 m) | 200 lb (91 kg) | RS Sr | Tualatin HS | Clackamas, Oregon |
| G | 50 | Eric Williams Jr. | 6 ft 6 in (1.98 m) | 200 lb (91 kg) | RS Jr | Duquesne | Port Huron, Michigan |
| G | 54 | Will Johnson (W) | 6 ft 1 in (1.85 m) | 180 lb (82 kg) | RS Jr | Palisades HS | Pacific Palisades, California |

Head coach

- Dana Altman (Eastern New Mexico)

Assistant coach(es)

- Kevin McKenna (Creighton)
- Tony Stubblefield (Omaha)
- Mike Mennenga (Morehead State)

Legend

- (C) Team captain
- (S) Suspended
- (I) Ineligible
- (W) Walk-on
- Injured
- Current redshirt

Roster

== Schedule and results ==
| Date time, TV | Rank^{#} | Opponent^{#} | Result | Record | High points | High rebounds | High assists | Site (attendance) city, state |
Regular season
| November 25, 2020*; 6:00 pm, P12N | No. 20 | Eastern Washington | Postponed due to COVID-19 issues; rescheduled for December 7 | | | | | Matthew Knight Arena; Eugene, OR |
| December 2, 2020*; 6:00 pm, FS1 | No. 21 | vs. Missouri | L 75–83 | 0–1 | 31 – Omoruyi | 11 – Omoruyi | 5 – Hardy | CHI Health Center (89); Omaha, NE |
| December 4, 2020*; 6:00 pm, FS1 | No. 21 | vs. Seton Hall | W 83–70 | 1–1 | 22 – Omoruyi | 9 – Figueroa | 6 – Duarte | CHI Health Center (81); Omaha, NE |
| December 7, 2020*; 4:00 pm, P12N | | Eastern Washington | W 69–52 | 2–1 | 21 – Omoruyi | 10 – Tied | 5 – Hardy | Matthew Knight Arena (0); Eugene, OR |
| December 9, 2020*; 8:00 pm, P12N | | Florida A&M | W 87–66 | 3–1 | 23 – Duarte | 6 – Williams Jr. | 5 – Terry | Matthew Knight Arena (0); Eugene, OR |
| December 12, 2020; 5:00 pm, P12N | | at Washington | W 74–71 | 4–1 (1–0) | 14 – Duarte | 10 – Dante | 3 – Omoruyi | Alaska Airlines Arena (0); Seattle, WA |
| December 17, 2020*; 5:00 pm, P12N | | San Francisco | W 74–64 | 5–1 | 19 – Omoruyi | 9 – Figueroa | 3 – Hardy | Matthew Knight Arena (0); Eugene, OR |
| December 19, 2020; 12:00 pm, P12N | | Portland | W 80–41 | 6–1 | 21 – Duarte | 6 – Tied | 5 – Tied | Matthew Knight Arena (0); Eugene, OR |
| December 31, 2020; 7:00 pm, P12N | No. 21 | California | W 82–69 | 7–1 (2–0) | 26 – Omoruyi | 6 – Tied | 5 – Hardy | Matthew Knight Arena (0); Eugene, OR |
| January 2, 2021; 7:00 pm, ESPNU | No. 21 | Stanford | W 73–56 | 8–1 (3–0) | 23 – Duarte | 12 – Figueroa | 7 – Hardy | Matthew Knight Arena (0); Eugene, OR |
| January 7, 2021; 2:00 pm, FS1 | No. 17 | at Colorado | L 72–79 | 8–2 (3–1) | 27 – Duarte | 6 – Tied | 2 – Tied | CU Events Center (0); Boulder, CO |
| January 10, 2021; 11:00 am, P12N | No. 17 | at Utah | W 79–73 | 9–2 (4–1) | 25 – Duarte | 6 – Tied | 4 – Tied | Jon M. Huntsman Center (0); Salt Lake City, UT |
| January 14, 2021; 6:00 pm, ESPN | No. 22 | Arizona State | Canceled due to COVID-19 issues | | | | | Matthew Knight Arena; Eugene, OR |
| January 23, 2021; 7:30 pm, P12N | No. 21 | Oregon State; Rivalry | L 64–75 | 9–3 (4–2) | 15 – Omoruyi | 9 – Omoruyi | 3 – Hardy | Matthew Knight Arena (0); Eugene, OR |
| January 28, 2021; 6:00 pm, ESPN | | at No. 23 UCLA | Canceled due to COVID-19 issues | | | | | Pauley Pavilion; Los Angeles, CA |
| February 4, 2021; 8:00 pm, FS1 | | Washington State | L 71–74 | 9–4 (4–3) | 21 – Omoruyi | 11 – Figueroa | 5 – Richardson | Matthew Knight Arena (0); Eugene, OR |
| February 6, 2021; 1:00 pm, CBS | | Washington | W 86–74 | 10–4 (5–3) | 25 – Omoruyi | 9 – Figueroa | 5 – Tied | Matthew Knight Arena (0); Eugene, OR |
| February 11, 2021; 6:00 pm, ESPN | | at Arizona State | W 75–64 | 11–4 (6–3) | 18 – Tied | 10 – Omoruyi | 4 – Duarte | Desert Financial Arena (0); Tempe, AZ |
| February 13, 2021; 11:00 am, ESPN2 | | at Arizona | W 63–61 | 12–4 (7–3) | 19 – Omoruyi | 6 – Figueroa | 4 – Duarte | McKale Center (0); Tucson, AZ |
| February 18, 2021; 8:00 pm, ESPN2 | | Colorado | W 60–56 | 13–4 (8–3) | 18 – Duarte | 7 – Duarte | 2 – Duarte | Matthew Knight Arena (0); Eugene, OR |
| February 20, 2021; 6:00 pm, P12N | | Utah | W 67–64 | 14–4 (9–3) | 15 – Duarte | 6 – Omoruyi | 3 – Omoruyi | Matthew Knight Arena (0); Eugene, OR |
| February 22, 2021; 6:00 pm, FS1 | | at No. 19 USC | L 58–72 | 14–5 (9–4) | 14 – Tied | 9 – Williams Jr. | 4 – Duarte | Galen Center (0); Los Angeles, CA |
| February 25, 2021; 6:00 pm, ESPNU | | at Stanford | W 71–68 | 15–5 (10–4) | 24 – Duarte | 10 – Omoruyi | 4 – Omoruyi | Maples Pavilion (1); Stanford, CA |
| February 27, 2021; 1:00 pm, FS1 | | at California | W 74–63 | 16–5 (11–4) | 21 – Omoruyi | 11 – Figueroa | 3 – Richardson | Haas Pavilion (0); Berkeley, CA |
| March 1, 2021; 6:00 pm, ESPN2 | | Arizona | W 80–69 | 17–5 (12–4) | 22 – Duarte | 7 – Duarte | 5 – Richardson | Matthew Knight Arena (0); Eugene, OR |
| March 3, 2021; 6:00 pm, ESPN2 | | UCLA | W 82–74 | 18–5 (13–4) | 23 – Duarte | 8 – Williams Jr. | 4 – Omoruyi | Matthew Knight Arena (0); Eugene, OR |
| March 7, 2021; 5:00 pm, FS1 | | at Oregon State; Rivalry | W 80–67 | 19–5 (14–4) | 22 – Richardson | 6 – Williams Jr. | 6 – Duarte | Gill Coliseum (0); Corvallis, OR |
Pac-12 tournament
| March 11, 2021; 11:30 am, P12N | (1) | vs. (8) Arizona State; Quarterfinals | W 91–73 | 20–5 | 21 – Figueroa | 7 – Richardson | 9 – Richardson | T-Mobile Arena (0); Paradise, NV |
| March 11, 2021; 5:30 pm, P12N | (1) | vs. (5) Oregon State; Semifinals/Rivalry | L 64–75 | 20–6 | 14 – Tied | 7 – Richardson | 6 – Richardson | T-Mobile Arena (0); Paradise, NV |
NCAA tournament
| March 20, 2021; 6:57 pm, TNT | (7 W) | vs. (10 W) VCU; First Round | Advanced due to COVID-19 protocols from VCU | | | | | Indiana Farmers Coliseum; Indianapolis, IN |
| March 22, 2021; 9:10 am, CBS | (7 W) | vs. (2 W) No. 8 Iowa; Second Round | W 95–80 | 21–6 | 23 – Duarte | 7 – Figueroa | 7 – Tied | Bankers Life Fieldhouse; Indianapolis, IN |
| March 28, 2021; 6:45 pm, TBS | (7 W) | vs. (6 W) No. 23 USC; Sweet Sixteen | L 68–82 | 21–7 | 28 – Omoruyi | 10 – Omoruyi | 6 – Duarte | Bankers Life Fieldhouse; Indianapolis, IN |
*Non-conference game. ^{#}Rankings from AP Poll. (#) Tournament seedings in parentheses. All times are in Pacific Time.

== Ranking movement ==
Ranking movements Legend: ██ Increase in ranking ██ Decrease in ranking — = Not ranked RV = Received votes т = Tied with team above or below
| | Week | | | | | | | | | | | | | | | | | |
| Poll | Pre | 1 | 2 | 3 | 4 | 5 | 6 | 7 | 8 | 9 | 10 | 11 | 12 | 13 | 14 | 15 | 16 | Final |
|---|---|---|---|---|---|---|---|---|---|---|---|---|---|---|---|---|---|---|
| AP | 20 | 21 | RV | RV | 25 | 21т | 17 | 22 | 21 | RV | RV | — | RV | RV | RV | RV | RV | Not released |
| Coaches | 20 | 20^ | RV | RV | 24 | 17 | 15 | 17 | 21 | 25 | RV | RV | 25 | 23 | 25 | 25 | 25 | 17 |

*AP does not release post-NCAA Tournament rankings.
^Coaches did not release a Week 1 poll.
