= Stagg High School =

Stagg High School may refer to:

- Amos Alonzo Stagg High School (Palos Hills, Illinois)
- Stagg High School (Stockton, California)
