= 2019–20 Oregon Ducks men's basketball team =

American college basketball season

2019–20 Oregon Ducks men's basketball

Pac-12 regular season champions
- Conference: Pac-12 Conference

Ranking
- Coaches: No. 14
- AP: No. 13
- Record: 24–7 (13–5 Pac-12)
- Head coach: Dana Altman (10th season)
- Assistant coaches: Kevin McKenna; Tony Stubblefield; Mike Mennenga
- Home arena: Matthew Knight Arena

2019–20 Pac-12 Conference men's basketball standings
	Conf.				Overall
Team	W		L	PCT	W		L	PCT
No. 13 Oregon	13	–	5	.722	24	–	7	.774
UCLA	12	–	6	.667	19	–	12	.613
USC	11	–	7	.611	22	–	9	.710
Arizona State	11	–	7	.611	20	–	11	.645
Arizona	10	–	8	.556	21	–	11	.656
Colorado	10	–	8	.556	21	–	11	.656
Stanford	9	–	9	.500	20	–	12	.625
Oregon State	7	–	11	.389	18	–	13	.581
Utah	7	–	11	.389	16	–	15	.516
California	7	–	11	.389	14	–	18	.438
Washington State	6	–	12	.333	16	–	16	.500
Washington	5	–	13	.278	15	–	17	.469
Note: The 2020 Pac-12 Tournament was canceled prior to the quarterfinals due to the COVID-19 pandemic. Rankings from AP poll

The 2019–20 Oregon Ducks men's basketball team represented the University of Oregon during the 2019–20 NCAA Division I men's basketball season. The Ducks, led by 10th-year head coach Dana Altman, played their home games at Matthew Knight Arena as members of the Pac–12 Conference. They finished the season 24–7, 13–5 in Pac-12 play to win the regular season Pac-12 championship. They were set to take on rival Oregon State in the quarterfinals of the Pac-12 tournament. However, the Pac-12 Tournament, along with all postseason tournaments, was cancelled amid the COVID-19 pandemic.

== Previous season ==
The Ducks finished the season with a 25–13 record, 10–8 in conference play, and finished tied for fourth in the Pac-12. As the 6 seed in the Pac-12 tournament, Oregon upset No. 3-seeded Utah, No. 2-seeded Arizona State, and No. 1-seeded Washington to win the tournament championship and receive the conference's automatic bid to the NCAA tournament. Oregon entered the NCAA Tournament as a No. 12 seed and upset the No. 5 seed Wisconsin in the first round. Oregon made it to the Sweet Sixteen where they lost to Virginia, who would eventually become National Champions.

== Off-season ==
=== Departures ===
Name	Pos.	Height	Weight	Year	Hometown	Reason for departure
Ehab Amin	G	6'4"	200	GS	Alexandria, Egypt	Completed athletic eligibility.
Paul White	F	6'9"	230	RS Sr.	Chicago, Illinois	Graduated.
Kenny Wooten	F	6'9"	235	So.	Manteca, California	Declared for 2019 NBA draft
Victor Bailey Jr.	G	6'4"	190	So.	Austin, Texas	Elected to transfer.
Abu Kigab	F	6'7"	190	So.	St. Catharines, Ontario	Transferred to Boise State
Bol Bol	C	7'2"	235	Fr.	Olathe, Kansas	Declared for 2019 NBA draft
Miles Norris	F	6'10"	210	Fr.	San Diego, California	Elected to transfer
Louis King	F	6'9"	205	Fr.	Jersey City, New Jersey	Declared for 2019 NBA draft

=== Incoming transfers ===
Name	Pos.	Height	Weight	Year	Hometown	Notes
Shakur Juiston	F	6'7"	225	GS	Newark, New Jersey	Graduate transfer from UNLV
Anthony Mathis	G	6'4"	185	GS	West Linn, Oregon	Graduate transfer from New Mexico
Eugene Omoruyi	F	6'6"	235	Sr.	Rexdale, Ontario	Transfer from Rutgers
Eric Williams Jr.	F	6'6"	200	Jr.	Port Huron, Michigan	Transfer from Duquesne
Chris Duarte	G	6'6"	190	Jr.	Puerto Plata, Dominican Republic	Junior college transfer from NW Florida State College
Eddy Ionescu	G	6'6"	190	Jr.	Walnut Creek, California	Walk-on; played at City College of San Francisco before spending the 2018–19 school year at Oregon as strictly a student. Twin brother of Oregon women's star Sabrina Ionescu.

=== 2019 recruiting class ===
College recruiting information
Name	Hometown	School	Height	Weight	Commit date
Isaac Johnson; C	American Fork, UT	American Fork High School	6 ft 10 in (2.08 m)	235 lb (107 kg)	Nov 8, 2018
Isaac Johnson; C	Recruit ratings: Scout: Rivals: 247Sports: ESPN: (88)				
Chandler Lawson; PF	Memphis, TN	Wooddale High School	6 ft 8 in (2.03 m)	195 lb (88 kg)	Nov 14, 2018
Chandler Lawson; PF	Recruit ratings: Scout: Rivals: 247Sports: ESPN: (84)				
C. J. Walker; PF	Sanford, FL	Oak Ridge High School	6 ft 8 in (2.03 m)	198 lb (90 kg)	Nov 21, 2018
C. J. Walker; PF	Recruit ratings: Scout: Rivals: 247Sports: ESPN: (92)				
Lok Wur; PF	Papillion, NE	LaVista South High School	6 ft 8 in (2.03 m)	190 lb (86 kg)	Jun 23, 2019
Lok Wur; PF	Recruit ratings: Scout: Rivals: 247Sports: ESPN: (NR)				
N'Faly Dante; C	Bamako, Mali	Sunrise Christian Academy (KS)	6 ft 11 in (2.11 m)	230 lb (100 kg)	Aug 13, 2019
N'Faly Dante; C	Recruit ratings: Scout: Rivals: 247Sports: ESPN: (89)				
Addison Patterson; SG	Milton, ON	Bella Vista College Prep	6 ft 4 in (1.93 m)	185 lb (84 kg)	Aug 19, 2019
Addison Patterson; SG	Recruit ratings: Scout: Rivals: 247Sports: ESPN: (88)				
Overall recruit ranking: Rivals: 7 247Sports: 4
Note: In many cases, Scout, Rivals, 247Sports, On3, and ESPN may conflict in their listings of height and weight.; In these cases, the average was taken. ESPN grades are on a 100-point scale.; Sources:

== Roster ==
2019–20 Oregon Ducks men's basketball team
Players
Coaches

Pos.	#	Name	Height	Weight	Year	Previous school	Hometown
G	0	Will Richardson	6 ft 5 in (1.96 m)	180 lb (82 kg)	So	Oak Hill Academy	Hinesville, Georgia
C	1	N'Faly Dante	6 ft 11 in (2.11 m)	230 lb (104 kg)	Fr	Sunrise Christian Academy	Bamako, Mali
F	2	Eugene Omoruyi (redshirt)	6 ft 6 in (1.98 m)	235 lb (107 kg)	Sr	Rutgers	Rexdale, Ontario
G	3	Payton Pritchard	6 ft 2 in (1.88 m)	190 lb (86 kg)	Sr	West Linn HS	West Linn, Oregon
G	4	Eddy Ionescu (W)	6 ft 6 in (1.98 m)	190 lb (86 kg)	Jr	City College of San Francisco	Walnut Creek, California
G	5	Chris Duarte	6 ft 6 in (1.98 m)	190 lb (86 kg)	Jr	Northwest Florida State College	Puerto Plata, Dominican Republic
F	10	Shakur Juiston	6 ft 7 in (2.01 m)	225 lb (102 kg)	RS Sr	UNLV	Paterson, New Jersey
F	13	Chandler Lawson	6 ft 8 in (2.03 m)	205 lb (93 kg)	Fr	Wooddale HS	Memphis, Tennessee
F	14	C. J. Walker	6 ft 8 in (2.03 m)	200 lb (91 kg)	Fr	Oak Ridge HS	Sanford, Florida
F	15	Lök Wur (redshirt)	6 ft 8 in (2.03 m)	200 lb (91 kg)	Fr	Papillion-La Vista South HS	Omaha, Nebraska
G	22	Addison Patterson	6 ft 6 in (1.98 m)	195 lb (88 kg)	Fr	Bella Vista College Prep	Milton, Ontario
G	25	Luke Osborn (W)	6 ft 6 in (1.98 m)	200 lb (91 kg)	RS Jr	Tualatin HS	Clackamas, Oregon
G	32	Anthony Mathis	6 ft 4 in (1.93 m)	185 lb (84 kg)	RS Sr	New Mexico	West Linn, Oregon
F	33	Francis Okoro	6 ft 9 in (2.06 m)	235 lb (107 kg)	So	Normal Community West HS	Imo, Nigeria
G	50	Eric Williams Jr. (redshirt)	6 ft 6 in (1.98 m)	200 lb (91 kg)	Jr	Duquesne	Port Huron, Michigan
G	54	Will Johnson (W)	6 ft 1 in (1.85 m)	180 lb (82 kg)	RS So	Palisades HS	Pacific Palisades, California

Head coach

- Dana Altman (Eastern New Mexico)

Assistant coach(es)

- Kevin McKenna (Creighton)
- Tony Stubblefield (Omaha)
- Mike Mennenga (Morehead State)

Legend

- (C) Team captain
- (S) Suspended
- (I) Ineligible
- (W) Walk-on
- Injured
- Current redshirt

Roster

- Freshman center N'Faly Dante missed first nine games of the season due to academic ineligibility.

== Schedule and results ==
Date time, TV	Rank^{#}	Opponent^{#}	Result	Record	High points	High rebounds	High assists	Site (attendance) city, state
Non-conference regular season
November 5, 2019*; 6:00 pm, P12N	No. 15	Fresno State	W 71–57	1–0	24 – Pritchard	10 – Okoro	7 – Pritchard	Matthew Knight Arena (6,779); Eugene, OR
November 9, 2019*; 8:00 pm, P12N	No. 15	Boise State	W 106–75	2–0	30 – Mathis	9 – Lawson	9 – Juiston	Matthew Knight Arena (7,260); Eugene, OR
November 12, 2019*; 6:00 pm, ESPN	No. 14	vs. No. 13 Memphis; Phil Knight Invitational	W 82–74	3–0	17 – Juiston	10 – Juiston	6 – Tied	Moda Center (7,296); Portland, OR
November 17, 2019*; 5:00 pm, P12N	No. 14	UT Arlington; Battle 4 Atlantis on-campus game	W 67–47	4–0	24 – Pritchard	8 – Tied	3 – Pritchard	Matthew Knight Arena (6,017); Eugene, OR
November 22, 2019*; 6:00 pm, P12N	No. 11	Houston	W 78–66	5–0	18 – Mathis	6 – Juiston	5 – Pritchard	Matthew Knight Arena (8,095); Eugene, OR
November 27, 2019*; 6:30 pm, ESPN2	No. 11	vs. No. 13 Seton Hall; Battle 4 Atlantis quarterfinals	W 71–69	6–0	16 – Pritchard	9 – Juiston	6 – Pritchard	Imperial Arena (1,565); Nassau, Bahamas
November 28, 2019*; 1:00 pm, ESPN	No. 11	vs. No. 8 Gonzaga; Battle 4 Atlantis semifinals	L 72–73 ^{OT}	6–1	17 – Pritchard	9 – Duarte	4 – Pritchard	Imperial Arena (1,432); Nassau, Bahamas
November 29, 2019*; 8:30 am, ESPN	No. 11	vs. No. 6 North Carolina; Battle 4 Atlantis 3rd place game	L 74–78	6–2	19 – Pritchard	7 – Tied	6 – Pritchard	Imperial Arena (2,110); Nassau, Bahamas
December 7, 2019*; 6:00 pm, P12N	No. 13	Hawaii	W 89–64	7–2	20 – Pritchard	7 – Okoro	11 – Pritchard	Matthew Knight Arena (6,599); Eugene, OR
December 14, 2019*; 9:00 am, CBS	No. 10	at No. 5 Michigan	W 71–70 ^{OT}	8–2	23 – Pritchard	6 – Tied	4 – Pritchard	Crisler Center (12,707); Ann Arbor, MI
December 18, 2019*; 8:00 pm, P12N	No. 8	Montana	W 81–48	9–2	14 – Tied	17 – Okoro	7 – Pritchard	Matthew Knight Arena (5,803); Eugene, OR
December 21, 2019*; 7:30 pm, P12N	No. 8	Texas Southern	W 84–78	10–2	29 – Pritchard	7 – Okoro	6 – Pritchard	Matthew Knight Arena (6,764); Eugene, OR
December 29, 2019*; 1:00 pm, P12N	No. 6	Alabama State	W 98–59	11–2	31 – Duarte	8 – Lawson	9 – Pritchard	Matthew Knight Arena (6,771); Eugene, OR
Pac-12 regular season
January 2, 2020; 6:00 pm, ESPN2	No. 4	at Colorado	L 65–74	11–3 (0–1)	21 – Pritchard	6 – Pritchard	5 – Lawson	CU Events Center (10,770); Boulder, CO
January 4, 2020; 2:00 pm, P12N	No. 4	at Utah	W 69–64	12–3 (1–1)	19 – Pritchard	8 – Lawson	5 – Tied	Jon M. Huntsman Center (13,104); Salt Lake City, UT
January 9, 2020; 6:00 pm, ESPN	No. 9	No. 24 Arizona	W 74–73 ^{OT}	13–3 (2–1)	21 – Richardson	8 – Duarte	6 – Pritchard	Matthew Knight Arena (10,113); Eugene, OR
January 11, 2020; 7:30 pm, P12N	No. 9	Arizona State	W 78–69	14–3 (3–1)	29 – Pritchard	9 – Juiston	6 – Pritchard	Matthew Knight Arena (9,213); Eugene, OR
January 16, 2020; 6:30 pm, FS1	No. 8	at Washington State	L 61–72	14–4 (3–2)	22 – Pritchard	7 – Juiston	5 – Pritchard	Beasley Coliseum (3,082); Pullman, WA
January 18, 2020; 12:45 pm, CBS	No. 8	at Washington	W 64–61 ^{OT}	15–4 (4–2)	22 – Pritchard	12 – Lawson	4 – Duarte	Alaska Airlines Arena (9,268); Seattle, WA
January 23, 2020; 8:00 pm, ESPNU	No. 12	USC	W 79–70 ^{2OT}	16–4 (5–2)	30 – Duarte	11 – Duarte	7 – Pritchard	Matthew Knight Arena (7,497); Eugene, OR
January 26, 2020; 2:00 pm, FOX	No. 12	UCLA	W 96–75	17–4 (6–2)	24 – Duarte	6 – Duarte	6 – Pritchard	Matthew Knight Arena (9,309); Eugene, OR
January 30, 2020; 6:00 pm, P12N	No. 11	at California	W 77–72	18–4 (7–2)	21 – Pritchard	7 – Juiston	8 – Pritchard	Haas Pavilion (6,117); Berkeley, CA
February 1, 2020; 3:00 pm, P12N	No. 11	at Stanford	L 60–70	18–5 (7–3)	17 – Richardson	8 – Duarte	4 – Pritchard	Maples Pavilion (5,523); Stanford, CA
February 8, 2020; 7:30 pm, P12N	No. 14	at Oregon State; Civil War	L 53–63	18–6 (7–4)	16 – Pritchard	10 – Juiston	9 – Pritchard	Gill Coliseum (9,301); Corvallis, OR
February 13, 2020; 6:00 pm, ESPN	No. 17	No. 16 Colorado	W 68–60	19–6 (8–4)	21 – Richardson	11 – Pritchard	6 – Pritchard	Matthew Knight Arena (9,275); Eugene, OR
February 16, 2020; 6:00 pm, FS1	No. 17	Utah	W 80–62	20–6 (9–4)	25 – Pritchard	6 – Richardson	6 – Richardson	Matthew Knight Arena (8,542); Eugene, OR
February 20, 2020; 6:00 pm, ESPN	No. 14	at Arizona State	L 72–77	20–7 (9–5)	18 – Tied	6 – Tied	5 – Lawson	Desert Financial Arena (12,951); Tempe, AZ
February 22, 2020; 6:00 pm, ESPN	No. 14	at No. 24 Arizona	W 73–72 ^{OT}	21–7 (10–5)	38 – Pritchard	10 – Duarte	4 – Pritchard	McKale Center (14,644); Tucson, AZ
February 27, 2020; 8:00 pm, ESPN2	No. 14	Oregon State; Civil War	W 69–54	22–7 (11–5)	23 – Pritchard	6 – Okoro	3 – Tied	Matthew Knight Arena (10,098); Eugene, OR
March 5, 2020; 8:00 pm, ESPN2	No. 13	California	W 90–56	23–7 (12–5)	20 – Pritchard	6 – Walker	9 – Pritchard	Matthew Knight Arena (7,651); Eugene, OR
March 7, 2020; 8:00 pm, FS1	No. 13	Stanford	W 80–67	24–7 (13–5)	29 – Pritchard	9 – Juiston	5 – Pritchard	Matthew Knight Arena (10,862); Eugene, OR
Pac-12 tournament
March 12, 2020; 12:00 pm, P12N	(1) No.13	vs. (8) Oregon State; Quarterfinals/Civil War	Cancelled due to the COVID-19 pandemic					T-Mobile Arena; Paradise, NV
*Non-conference game. ^{#}Rankings from AP Poll. (#) Tournament seedings in parentheses. All times are in Pacific Time.

== Ranking movement ==
Ranking movements Legend: ██ Increase in ranking ██ Decrease in ranking
	Week																			
Poll	Pre	1	2	3	4	5	6	7	8	9	10	11	12	13	14	15	16	17	18	Final
AP	15	14	11	11	13	10	8	6	4	9	8	12	11	14	17	14	14	13	13	13
Coaches	14	14^	11	10	14	13	10	7	6	9	8	13	12	15	18	16	16	13	13	14

*AP does not release post-NCAA Tournament rankings.
^Coaches did not release a Week 2 poll.
