= 2019–20 Arizona Wildcats men's basketball team =

American college basketball season

2019–20 Arizona Wildcats men's basketball

Wooden Legacy champions
- Conference: Pac-12 Conference
- Record: 21–11 (10–8 Pac-12)
- Head coach: Sean Miller (11th season)
- Associate head coach: Jack Murphy
- Assistant coaches: Danny Peters; Justin Gainey
- Home arena: McKale Center

2019–20 Pac-12 Conference men's basketball standings
| | Conf. | | | | Overall |
| Team | W | | L | PCT | W | | L | PCT |
|---|---|---|---|---|---|---|---|---|
| No. 13 Oregon | 13 | – | 5 | .722 | 24 | – | 7 | .774 |
| UCLA | 12 | – | 6 | .667 | 19 | – | 12 | .613 |
| USC | 11 | – | 7 | .611 | 22 | – | 9 | .710 |
| Arizona State | 11 | – | 7 | .611 | 20 | – | 11 | .645 |
| Arizona | 10 | – | 8 | .556 | 21 | – | 11 | .656 |
| Colorado | 10 | – | 8 | .556 | 21 | – | 11 | .656 |
| Stanford | 9 | – | 9 | .500 | 20 | – | 12 | .625 |
| Oregon State | 7 | – | 11 | .389 | 18 | – | 13 | .581 |
| Utah | 7 | – | 11 | .389 | 16 | – | 15 | .516 |
| California | 7 | – | 11 | .389 | 14 | – | 18 | .438 |
| Washington State | 6 | – | 12 | .333 | 16 | – | 16 | .500 |
| Washington | 5 | – | 13 | .278 | 15 | – | 17 | .469 |
Note: The 2020 Pac-12 Tournament was canceled prior to the quarterfinals due to the COVID-19 pandemic. Rankings from AP poll

The 2019–20 Arizona Wildcats men's basketball team represented the University of Arizona during the 2019–20 NCAA Division I men's basketball season. The team was led by 11th-year head coach Sean Miller and played their home games at McKale Center in Tucson, Arizona as members of the Pac-12 Conference. They finished the season 21–11, 10–8 in Pac-12 play to finish in tie for fifth place. They received the No. 5 seed in the 2019 Pac-12 tournament, where they defeated Washington in the first round and were set to take on USC in the quarterfinals before the remainder of the Pac-12 Tournament was cancelled amid the COVID-19 pandemic.

== Previous season ==
The Wildcats finished the 2018–19 season 17–15, 8–10 in Pac-12 play to finish in three-way tie for 6th place. They received the 9-seed in the 2019 Pac-12 tournament, where they lost to 8-seed USC in the first round, 78–65.

== Offseason ==
Departures
| Name | Position | Year | Hometown | Reason |
|---|---|---|---|---|
| Ryan Luther | F | Graduate Student | Gibsonia, PA | Completed athletic eligibility |
| Justin Coleman | G | Graduate Student | Birmingham, AL | Completed athletic eligibility |
| Alex Barcello | G | Junior | Chandler, AZ | Elected to transfer to BYU. |
| Emmanuel Akot | F | Sophomore | Winnipeg, MB | Quit team in January. Later elected to transfer to Boise State. |
| Brandon Randolph | G | Sophomore | Yonkers, NY | Entered 2019 NBA draft. |

Incoming transfers
| Name | Position | Year | Hometown | Previous school | Remaining eligibility | Notes |
|---|---|---|---|---|---|---|
| Stone Gettings | F | Graduate Student | Malibu, CA | Cornell | 1 | Graduated from Cornell in December 2018, redshirted the remainder of the season at Arizona. Will play for the entire 2019–20 season. |
| Max Hazzard | G | Graduate Student | Los Angeles, CA | UC Irvine | 1 | Graduate from UC Irvine. Max is eligible to play immediately as a graduate. |
| Jemarl Baker | G | Redshirt Sophomore | Menifee, CA | Kentucky | 2 | Transfer from Kentucky. Jemarl has been granted a waiver by the NCAA and will be eligible to play for the Arizona Wildcats in 2019-20 instead sitting out a year. |
| Jordan Brown | F | Sophomore | Roseville, CA | Nevada | 3 | Transfer from Nevada. He will redshirt the 2019–20 season under NCAA transfer rules and have three years of eligibility at the start of the 2020–21 season. |

=== 2019 recruiting class ===
Nico Mannion, originally from Siena, Italy, was originally a part of the 2020 recruiting class, but reclassified to the 2019 class in July 2018. He verbally committed to Arizona on September 14, 2018, over Marquette. Mannion is a consensus five-star prospect out of Pinnacle HS in Phoenix, Arizona.

Christian Koloko, originally from Douala, Cameroon, was the second commitment in the Arizona class. He committed to Arizona on September 23, 2018, over California, Creighton, and Vanderbilt. He is a consensus four-star prospect out of Sierra Canyon School in Chatsworth, California.

Josh Green, originally from Sydney, New South Wales, Australia was the third commitment in the Arizona's 2019 recruiting class. He verbally committed to Arizona on October 4, 2018, over Kansas, North Carolina, Villanova, USC and UNLV. Green is a consensus five-star prospect out of IMG Academy in Bradenton, Florida.

Zeke Nnaji, originally from Lakeville, MN was the fifth commitment in the Arizona's 2019 recruiting class. He verbally committed to Arizona on November 23, 2018, over UCLA, North Carolina, Kansas and Purdue. Nnaji is a consensus four-star prospect out of Hopkins High School in Minnetonka, Minnesota.

College recruiting information
| Name | Hometown | School | Height | Weight | Commit date |
|---|---|---|---|---|---|
| Nico Mannion; PG | Siena, Italy | Pinnacle HS (AZ) | 6 ft 3 in (1.91 m) | 180 lb (82 kg) | Sep 14, 2018 |
| Nico Mannion; PG | Recruit ratings: Rivals: 247Sports: ESPN: (96) | | | | |
| Christian Koloko; C | Douala, Cameroon | Sierra Canyon School (CA) | 7 ft 0 in (2.13 m) | 195 lb (88 kg) | Sep 23, 2018 |
| Christian Koloko; C | Recruit ratings: Rivals: 247Sports: ESPN: (81) | | | | |
| Josh Green; G/F | Sydney, New South Wales, Australia | IMG Academy (FL) | 6 ft 6 in (1.98 m) | 190 lb (86 kg) | Oct 4, 2018 |
| Josh Green; G/F | Recruit ratings: Rivals: 247Sports: ESPN: (96) | | | | |
| Zeke Nnaji; F/C | Lakeville, MN | Hopkins HS | 6 ft 11 in (2.11 m) | 230 lb (100 kg) | Nov 23, 2018 |
| Zeke Nnaji; F/C | Recruit ratings: Rivals: 247Sports: ESPN: (88) | | | | |
Overall recruit ranking: Rivals: #11 247Sports: #5 ESPN: #6
Note: In many cases, Scout, Rivals, 247Sports, On3, and ESPN may conflict in their listings of height and weight.; In these cases, the average was taken. ESPN grades are on a 100-point scale.; Sources: "Arizona 2019 Basketball Commitments". Rivals.; "2019 Arizona Wildcats Recruiting Class". ESPN.; "2019 Team Ranking". Rivals.; "2019 Arizona 24/7 Sports Commits". 247Sports.

=== 2020 recruiting class ===
Dalen Terry, originally from Phoenix, Arizona, was the first commit of the 2020 recruiting class. He verbally committed to Arizona on July 23, 2019, over rival Arizona State, Arkansas, California, Colorado, Memphis, USC and Utah. Terry a consensus four-star prospect out of Hillcrest Prep in Phoenix, Arizona.

Bennedict Mathurin, originally from Montreal, Canada was the second commitment of the 2020 recruiting class. He verbally committed to Arizona on January 15, 2020, over Baylor & Washington State. Mathurin was a consensus four-star prospect out of the NBA Academy Latin America.

Kerr Kriisa, originally from Tartu, Estonia, was the third commitment of the 2020 recruiting class. He verbally committed to Arizona on April 18, 2020, over BYU, Oregon & Syracuse. Kriisa a consensus four-star prospect out of BC Prienai in Prienai, Lithuania.

Daniel Batcho, originally from Chatenay-Malabry, France, was the fourth commitment in the Arizona class. He committed to Arizona on April 23, 2020, over Arizona State, Creighton, Miami & Virginia Tech. He is a consensus four-star prospect out of Centre Fédéral de Basket-ball in Paris, France.

Tibet Gorener, originally from Şişli, Turkey, was the fifth commitment in the Arizona class. He committed to Arizona on April 28, 2020, over Nebraska, Creighton, UC Santa Barbara & UConn. He is consensus four-star out of Orange Lutheran HS in Orange, California.

Ąžuolas Tubelis, originally from Lithuania, was the sixth commitment in the Arizona class. He committed to Arizona on May 27, 2020. He is currently a four-star prospect out of Rytas Vilnius in Lithuania.

Tautvilas Tubelis, originally from Lithuania, was the seventh commitment in the Arizona class. He committed to Arizona on May 27, 2020. He is currently an unranked prospect out of Rytas Vilnius in Lithuania.

College recruiting information
| Name | Hometown | School | Height | Weight | Commit date |
|---|---|---|---|---|---|
| Dalen Terry; SF | Phoenix, AZ | Hillcrest Prep | 6 ft 7 in (2.01 m) | 190 lb (86 kg) | Jul 23, 2019 |
| Dalen Terry; SF | Recruit ratings: Rivals: 247Sports: ESPN: (84) | | | | |
| Bennedict Mathurin; SF | Montreal, Canada | NBA Latin America (MX) | 6 ft 6 in (1.98 m) | 190 lb (86 kg) | Jan 15, 2120 |
| Bennedict Mathurin; SF | Recruit ratings: Rivals: 247Sports: | | | | |
| Kerr Kriisa; PG | Tartu, Estonia | BC Prienai | 6 ft 2 in (1.88 m) | 170 lb (77 kg) | Apr 18, 2020 |
| Kerr Kriisa; PG | Recruit ratings: Rivals: 247Sports: | | | | |
| Daniel Batcho; PF | Chatenay-Malabry, France | Centre Fédéral de Basket-ball | 6 ft 10 in (2.08 m) | 220 lb (100 kg) | Apr 23, 2020 |
| Daniel Batcho; PF | Recruit ratings: Rivals: 247Sports: | | | | |
| Tibet Gorener; SF | Şişli, Turkey | Orange Lutheran HS (CA) | 6 ft 8 in (2.03 m) | 195 lb (88 kg) | Apr 28, 2020 |
| Tibet Gorener; SF | Recruit ratings: Rivals: 247Sports: | | | | |
| Ąžuolas Tubelis; PF | Vilnius, Lithuania | Rytas Vilnius | 6 ft 9 in (2.06 m) | 240 lb (110 kg) | May 27, 2020 |
| Ąžuolas Tubelis; PF | Recruit ratings: Rivals: 247Sports: | | | | |
| Tautvilas Tubelis; SF | Vilnius, Lithuania | Rytas Vilnius | 6 ft 7 in (2.01 m) | 230 lb (100 kg) | May 27, 2020 |
| Tautvilas Tubelis; SF | Recruit ratings: 247Sports: | | | | |
Overall recruit ranking: Rivals: #8 247Sports: #5 ESPN: #5
Note: In many cases, Scout, Rivals, 247Sports, On3, and ESPN may conflict in their listings of height and weight.; In these cases, the average was taken. ESPN grades are on a 100-point scale.; Sources: "Arizona 2020 Basketball Commitments". Rivals.; "2020 Arizona Wildcats Recruiting Class". ESPN.; "2020 Team Ranking". Rivals.; "2020 Arizona 24/7 Sports Commits". 247Sports.

=== Coaching changes ===
In June 2019, Northern Arizona head coach Jack Murphy resigned to take the position of associate head coach on Miller's staff.

== Personnel ==
=== Roster ===
2019–20 Arizona Wildcats men's basketball team
Players
Coaches

| Pos. | # | Name | Height | Weight | Year | Previous school | Hometown |
|---|---|---|---|---|---|---|---|
| G | 0 | Josh Green | 6 ft 6 in (1.98 m) | 210 lb (95 kg) | Fr | IMG Academy (FL) | Sydney, NSW |
| G | 1 | Nico Mannion | 6 ft 3 in (1.91 m) | 190 lb (86 kg) | Fr | Pinnacle HS (AZ) | Siena, Italy |
| G | 2 | Brandon Williams (injured) (redshirt) | 6 ft 2 in (1.88 m) | 190 lb (86 kg) | So | Crespi Carmelite HS | Los Angeles, CA |
| G | 3 | Dylan Smith | 6 ft 5 in (1.96 m) | 185 lb (84 kg) | RS Sr | UNC Asheville | Mobile, AL |
| F/C | 4 | Chase Jeter | 6 ft 10 in (2.08 m) | 240 lb (109 kg) | RS Sr | Duke | Las Vegas, NV |
| G | 5 | Max Hazzard | 6 ft 0 in (1.83 m) | 175 lb (79 kg) | GS | UC Irvine | Los Angeles, CA |
| G | 10 | Jemarl Baker Jr. | 6 ft 4 in (1.93 m) | 200 lb (91 kg) | RS So | Kentucky | Menifee, CA |
| F | 11 | Ira Lee | 6 ft 7 in (2.01 m) | 240 lb (109 kg) | Jr | Crossroads School | Los Angeles, CA |
| F | 13 | Stone Gettings | 6 ft 9 in (2.06 m) | 240 lb (109 kg) | GS | Cornell | Malibu, CA |
| F | 21 | Jordan Brown (redshirt) | 6 ft 11 in (2.11 m) | 210 lb (95 kg) | So | Nevada | Roseville, CA |
| F/C | 22 | Zeke Nnaji | 6 ft 11 in (2.11 m) | 240 lb (109 kg) | Fr | Hopkins HS | Lakeville, MN |
| C | 35 | Christian Koloko | 7 ft 0 in (2.13 m) | 215 lb (98 kg) | Fr | Sierra Canyon School (CA) | Douala, Cameroon |
| F | 50 | Jordan Mains (W) | 6 ft 6 in (1.98 m) | 200 lb (91 kg) | Fr | Pinnacle HS | Scottsdale, AZ |
| G | 52 | Kory Jones (W) | 6 ft 3 in (1.91 m) | 175 lb (79 kg) | RS Jr | Westfield HS | Herndon, VA |
| F | 54 | Matt Weyand (W) | 6 ft 5 in (1.96 m) | 200 lb (91 kg) | Jr | Mater Dei HS | Irvine, CA |
| F | 55 | Jake DesJardins (W) | 6 ft 6 in (1.98 m) | 220 lb (100 kg) | Sr | Coronado HS | Henderson, NV |

Head coach

- Sean Miller (Pittsburgh)

Assistant coach(es)

- Jack Murphy (Arizona)
- Danny Peters (Ohio State)
- Justin Gainey (NC State)

Legend

- (C) Team captain
- (S) Suspended
- (I) Ineligible
- (W) Walk-on
- Injured
- Current redshirt

Roster
Last update: January 3, 2020

- Aug. 7, 2019 – Sophomore guard Brandon Williams to miss entire 2019–20 season due to a right knee injury.
- Nov. 1, 2019 – Sophomore guard Devonaire Doutrive was suspended indefinitely after violating team rules. He returned to action Nov. 14, 2019
- Nov. 22, 2019 – Sophomore guard Devonaire Doutrive was dismissed after violating team rules.
- Nov. 30, 2019 – Graduate forward Stone Gettings out with concussion and facial fracture in game against Penn. Made return against Arizona State on January 4, 2020.
- Jan. 3, 2020 – Freshman Jordan Mains has been added to the roster as a walk-on.
- Jan. 16, 2020 – RS Senior center Chase Jeter out with a back injury.

=== Coaching staff ===
| Name | Position | Year at Arizona | Alma Mater (year) |
|---|---|---|---|
| Sean Miller | Head coach | 11th | Pittsburgh (1992) |
| Jack Murphy | Associate head coach | 1st | Arizona (2005) |
| Danny Peters | Assistant coach | 2nd | Ohio State (2010) |
| Justin Gainey | Assistant coach | 2nd | NC State (2000) |
| Ryan Reynolds | Director of Basketball Operations | 11th | Xavier (2007) |
| Austin Carroll | Assistant director of Basketball Operations | 4th | American (2014) |

=== Depth chart ===
| Pos. | Starting 5 | Bench 1 | Bench 2 |
|---|---|---|---|
| C | Zeke Nnaji | Christian Koloko | Chase Jeter |
| PF | Stone Gettings | Ira Lee |
| SF | Josh Green |
| SG | Dylan Smith | Max Hazzard |
| PG | Nico Mannion | Jemarl Baker Jr. |

== Preseason ==
=== Red and Blue game ===
The annual Red-Blue game was held at McKale Center on September 27, 2019. Sophomore Devonaire Doutrive won the slam dunk contest, and the Blue team, led by Devonaire Doutrive, defeated the Red team, 46–32.

=== Preseason rankings ===
The Arizona Wildcats were selected fourth in the 2019–20 Pac-12 media poll. The Wildcats were ranked 21 in the AP Top 25 and ranked 17 in the Coaches polls.

=== Preseason awards watchlists ===
- Josh Green – Julius Erving Award (FR, SG)
- Chase Jeter – Kareem Abdul-Jabbar Award (RSSR, F/C)
- Nico Mannion – Naismith Trophy (FR, PG)
- Nico Mannion – Wooden Award (FR, PG)
- Zeke Nnaji − Oscar Robertson Trophy (FR, PF)

=== Preseason All Pac-12 teams ===
The Wildcats had 2 players at 2 positions selected to the preseason all Pac-12 teams.

First team

- Nico Mannion – FR, PG

Second team

- Josh Green – FR, SG

== Schedule and results ==
The Wildcats opponents were finalized in the summer and dates and times will be finalized in the fall. Arizona will host opponents Chico State (exhibition game), Gonzaga, Illinois, Long Beach State, New Mexico State, Northern Arizona, Omaha, San Jose State, and South Dakota State at McKale Center in Tucson, AZ. Arizona will participate in the 2019 Wooden Legacy in Anaheim, CA with six of the following potential opponents including (College of Charleston, Pepperdine, Penn, Providence, UCF, or Wake Forest). The Wildcats will also play in a neutral-site game against St. John's at the new Chase Center in San Francisco, CA in the Naismith Memorial Hall of Fame Game. Arizona played only one true road game against Baylor at Ferrell Center in Waco, TX.

In the unbalanced 18-game Pac-12 schedule, Arizona did not play the two Rocky Mountain schools on the road (Colorado and Utah) or the two Northern California schools at home (California and Stanford).

| Date time, TV | Rank^{#} | Opponent^{#} | Result | Record | High points | High rebounds | High assists | Site (attendance) city, state |
Exhibition
| November 1, 2019*; 6:30 p.m., P12N | No. 21 | Chico State | W 74–65 | – | 17 – Jeter | 14 – Green | 6 – Mannion | McKale Center (12,605); Tucson, AZ |
Non-conference regular season
| November 6, 2019*; 7:00 pm, P12N | No. 21 | Northern Arizona | W 91–52 | 1–0 | 20 – Nnaji | 6 – Tied | 5 – Hazzard | McKale Center (12,960); Tucson, AZ |
| November 10, 2019*; 7:00 pm, P12N | No. 21 | Illinois | W 90–69 | 2–0 | 23 – Mannion | 7 – Jeter | 9 – Mannion | McKale Center (13,780); Tucson, AZ |
| November 14, 2019*; 6:00 pm, P12N | No. 19 | San Jose State | W 87–39 | 3–0 | 26 – Nnaji | 11 – Nnaji | 5 – Baker Jr. | McKale Center (12,755); Tucson, AZ |
| November 17, 2019*; 12:00 pm, P12N | No. 19 | New Mexico State | W 83–53 | 4–0 | 19 – Nnaji | 8 – Jeter | 4 – Hazzard | McKale Center (13,161); Tucson, AZ |
| November 21, 2019*; 7:00 pm, P12N | No. 14 | South Dakota State | W 71–64 | 5–0 | 15 – Green | 7 – Jeter | 4 – Mannion | McKale Center (12,828); Tucson, AZ |
| November 24, 2019*; 6:30 pm, P12N | No. 14 | Long Beach State; Wooden Legacy campus-site game | W 104–67 | 6–0 | 22 – Mannion | 6 – Jeter | 8 – Mannion | McKale Center (12,943); Tucson, AZ |
| November 28, 2019*; 9:00 pm, ESPN | No. 14 | vs. Pepperdine; Wooden Legacy quarterfinals | W 93–91 | 7–0 | 24 – Green | 11 – Nnaji | 11 – Mannion | Anaheim Arena (1,574); Anaheim, CA |
| November 29, 2019*; 9:30 pm, ESPN2 | No. 14 | vs. Penn; Wooden Legacy semifinals | W 92–82 | 8–0 | 24 – Mannion | 7 – Nnaji | 4 – Mannion | Anaheim Arena (2,605); Anaheim, CA |
| December 1, 2019*; 7:00 pm, ESPN | No. 14 | vs. Wake Forest; Wooden Legacy championship | W 73–66 | 9–0 | 20 – Smith | 11 – Green | 7 – Mannion | Anaheim Arena (2,185); Anaheim, CA |
| December 7, 2019*; 10:00 am, ESPNU | No. 12 | at No. 18 Baylor | L 58–63 | 9–1 | 15 – Mannion | 7 – Tied | 5 – Mannion | Ferrell Center (7,872); Waco, TX |
| December 11, 2019*; 6:00 pm, P12N | No. 15 | Omaha | W 99–49 | 10–1 | 15 – Tied | 10 – Koloko | 11 – Mannion | McKale Center (13,256); Tucson, AZ |
| December 14, 2019*; 8:00 pm, ESPN2 | No. 15 | No. 6 Gonzaga | L 80–84 | 10–2 | 17 – Green | 17 – Nnaji | 10 – Mannion | McKale Center (14,644); Tucson, AZ |
| December 21, 2019*; 8:00 pm, ESPN2 | No. 16 | vs. St. John's; Al Attles Classic | L 67–70 | 10–3 | 24 – Nnaji | 13 – Nnaji | 4 – Baker Jr. | Chase Center (6,728); San Francisco, CA |
Pac-12 regular season
| January 4, 2020; 7:30 pm, P12N | No. 25 | Arizona State; Rivalry | W 75–47 | 11–3 (1–0) | 17 – Nnaji | 11 – Nnaji | 7 – Mannion | McKale Center (14,644); Tucson, AZ |
| January 9, 2020; 7:00 pm, ESPN | No. 24 | at No. 9 Oregon | L 73–74 ^{OT} | 11–4 (1–1) | 20 – Mannion | 14 – Nnaji | 3 – Tied | Matthew Knight Arena (10,113); Eugene, OR |
| January 12, 2020; 8:00 pm, FS1 | No. 24 | at Oregon State | L 65–82 | 11–5 (1–2) | 21 – Nnaji | 9 – Nnaji | 9 – Mannion | Gill Coliseum (4,911); Corvallis, OR |
| January 16, 2020; 6:30 pm, P12N | | Utah | W 93–77 | 12–5 (2–2) | 24 – Tied | 8 – Nnaji | 6 – Smith | McKale Center (13,549); Tucson, AZ |
| January 18, 2020; 12:30 pm, FOX | | No. 20 Colorado | W 75–54 | 13–5 (3–2) | 13 – Tied | 12 – Nnaji | 5 – Mannion | McKale Center (14,279); Tucson, AZ |
| January 25, 2020; 7:30 pm, P12N | No. 22 | at Arizona State; Rivalry | L 65–66 | 13–6 (3–3) | 21 – Nnaji | 10 – Nnaji | 4 – Baker | Desert Financial Arena (13,500); Tempe, AZ |
| January 30, 2020; 7:00 pm, ESPN2 | | at Washington | W 75–72 | 14–6 (4–3) | 17 – Baker | 8 – Nnaji | 5 – Mannion | Alaska Airlines Arena (9,123); Seattle, WA |
| February 1, 2020; 6:00 pm, P12N | | at Washington State | W 66–49 | 15–6 (5–3) | 19 – Gettings | 12 – Gettings | 4 – Mannion | Beasley Coliseum (4,032); Pullman, WA |
| February 6, 2020; 7:00 pm, ESPN2 | No. 23 | USC | W 85–80 | 16–6 (6–3) | 20 – Mannion | 11 – Nnaji | 7 – Mannion | McKale Center (13,816); Tucson, AZ |
| February 8, 2020; 8:00 pm, ESPN2 | No. 23 | UCLA; Rivalry | L 52–65 | 16–7 (6–4) | 14 – Nnaji | 10 – Nnaji | 3 – Gettings | McKale Center (14,644); Tucson, AZ |
| February 13, 2020; 8:30 pm, FS1 | | at California | W 68–52 | 17–7 (7–4) | 21 – Nnaji | 6 – Tied | 5 – Mannion | Haas Pavilion (6,291); Berkeley, CA |
| February 15, 2020; 6:00 pm, P12N | | at Stanford | W 69–60 | 18–7 (8–4) | 21 – Nnaji | 11 – Nnaji | 3 – Green | Maples Pavilion (4,839); Stanford, CA |
| February 20, 2020; 6:00 pm, P12N | No. 24 | Oregon State | W 89–63 | 19–7 (9–4) | 18 – Green | 7 – Nnaji | 6 – Tied | McKale Center (13,555); Tucson, AZ |
| February 22, 2020; 7:00 pm, ESPN | No. 24 | No. 14 Oregon | L 72–73 ^{OT} | 19–8 (9–5) | 18 – Smith | 8 – Gettings | 8 – Mannion | McKale Center (14,644); Tucson, AZ |
| February 27, 2020; 7:00 pm, ESPN | | at USC | L 48–57 | 19–9 (9–6) | 15 – Nnaji | 9 – Nnaji | 2 – 2 Tied | Galen Center (4,121); Los Angeles, CA |
| February 29, 2020; 8:00 pm, ESPN | | at UCLA; Rivalry | L 64–69 | 19–10 (9–7) | 19 – Mannion | 8 – Smith | 5 – Mannion | Pauley Pavilion (11,567); Los Angeles, CA |
| March 5, 2020; 8:30 pm, FS1 | | Washington State | W 83–62 | 20–10 (10–7) | 23 – Mannion | 9 – Gettings | 7 – Mannion | McKale Center (13,052); Tucson, AZ |
| March 7, 2020; 8:00 pm, ESPN | | Washington | L 63–69 | 20–11 (10–8) | 19 – Smith | 11 – Nnaji | 5 – Mannion | McKale Center (13,604); Tucson, AZ |
Pac-12 Tournament
| March 11, 2020; 2:30 pm, P12N | (5) | vs. (12) Washington; First round | W 77–70 | 21–11 | 19 – Green | 9 – Nnaji | 6 – Smith | T-Mobile Arena (8,048); Paradise, NV |
| March 12, 2020; 2:30 pm, P12N | (5) | vs. (4) USC; Quarterfinals | Cancelled due to the COVID-19 pandemic | | | | | T-Mobile Arena; Paradise, NV |
*Non-conference game. ^{#}Rankings from AP Poll. (#) Tournament seedings in parentheses. All times are in Mountain Time.

== Rankings ==
Ranking movements Legend: ██ Increase in ranking ██ Decrease in ranking RV = Received votes т = Tied with team above or below
| | Week | | | | | | | | | | | | | | | | | | | |
| Poll | Pre | 1 | 2 | 3 | 4 | 5 | 6 | 7 | 8 | 9 | 10 | 11 | 12 | 13 | 14 | 15 | 16 | 17 | 18 | Final |
|---|---|---|---|---|---|---|---|---|---|---|---|---|---|---|---|---|---|---|---|---|
| AP | 21 | 19 | 14 | 14 | 12 | 15 | 16 | 24 | 25 | 24 | RV | 22 | RV | 23 | RV | 24 | RV | RV | RV | RV |
| Coaches | 17 | 17 | 14 | 14 | 11 | 14 | 17 | 24 | 24 | 24 | RV | 21 | RV | 23 | RV | 21 | 24-T | RV | RV | RV |

*AP does not release post-NCAA Tournament rankings
^Coaches did not release a Week 2 poll.

== Player statistics ==
Individual player statistics (Final)
| | | | Minutes | | Scoring | | Total FGs | | | 3-point FGs | | | Free-Throws | | | Rebounds | | | | | | | | |
| Player | GP | GS | Tot | Avg | Pts | Avg | FG | FGA | Pct | 3FG | 3FA | Pct | FT | FTA | Pct | Off | Def | Tot | Avg | A | PF | TO | Stl | Blk |
|---|---|---|---|---|---|---|---|---|---|---|---|---|---|---|---|---|---|---|---|---|---|---|---|---|
| Chase Jeter | 21 | 16 | 352 | 16.8 | 143 | 6.8 | 53 | 92 | 57.6% | 0 | 0 | 0.0% | 37 | 61 | 60.7% | 26 | 65 | 91 | 4.3 | 14 | 50 | 16 | 6 | 9 |
| Christian Koloko | 26 | 0 | 209 | 8.0 | 52 | 2.0 | 23 | 49 | 46.9% | 0 | 1 | 0.0% | 6 | 17 | 35.3% | 23 | 38 | 61 | 2.3 | 5 | 27 | 3 | 9 | 22 |
| Dylan Smith | 30 | 30 | 783 | 26.1 | 243 | 8.1 | 79 | 218 | 36.2% | 49 | 138 | 35.5% | 36 | 51 | 70.6% | 13 | 79 | 92 | 2.6 | 40 | 68 | 46 | 22 | 16 |
| Ira Lee | 30 | 2 | 404 | 13.5 | 105 | 3.5 | 44 | 82 | 53.7% | 0 | 0 | 0.0% | 17 | 30 | 56.7% | 29 | 68 | 97 | 3.2 | 29 | 53 | 24 | 15 | 11 |
| Jemarl Baker Jr. | 30 | 0 | 583 | 19.4 | 175 | 5.8 | 61 | 164 | 37.2% | 34 | 96 | 39.7% | 19 | 23 | 82.6% | 11 | 60 | 71 | 2.4 | 69 | 52 | 21 | 21 | 5 |
| Josh Green | 28 | 28 | 858 | 30.6 | 332 | 11.9 | 115 | 271 | 42.4% | 34 | 96 | 39.7% | 76 | 99 | 76.8% | 35 | 93 | 128 | 4.6 | 73 | 69 | 41 | 44 | 12 |
| Kory Jones | 5 | 0 | 8 | 1.6 | 0 | 0.0 | 0 | 1 | 0.0% | 0 | 0 | 0.0% | 0 | 0 | 0.0% | 0 | 0 | 0 | 0.0 | 0 | 0 | 0 | 0 | 0 |
| Matt Weyand | 6 | 0 | 9 | 1.5 | 6 | 1.0 | 2 | 4 | 50.0% | 2 | 4 | 50.0% | 0 | 0 | 0.0% | 0 | 0 | 0 | 0.0 | 0 | 2 | 2 | 0 | 0 |
| Max Hazzard | 28 | 0 | 413 | 14.8 | 149 | 5.3 | 50 | 118 | 42.4% | 34 | 89 | 38.2% | 15 | 18 | 83.3% | 7 | 37 | 44 | 1.6 | 26 | 43 | 18 | 15 | 1 |
| Nico Mannion | 30 | 30 | 955 | 31.8 | 422 | 14.1 | 137 | 350 | 39.1% | 50 | 152 | 32.9% | 98 | 121 | 81.0% | 8 | 69 | 77 | 2.6 | 162 | 53 | 76 | 33 | 0 |
| Stone Gettings | 25 | 15 | 512 | 20.5 | 167 | 6.7 | 65 | 130 | 50.0% | 15 | 39 | 38.5% | 22 | 32 | 68.8% | 29 | 46 | 75 | 4.0 | 23 | 62 | 28 | 15 | 7 |
| Zeke Nnaji | 30 | 30 | 912 | 30.4 | 492 | 16.4 | 172 | 297 | 57.9% | 5 | 17 | 29.4% | 143 | 188 | 76.1% | 89 | 167 | 256 | 8.5 | 24 | 70 | 63 | 21 | 28 |
| Jordan Mains | 2 | 0 | 2 | 1.0 | 0 | 0.0 | 0 | 0 | 0.0% | 0 | 0 | 0.0% | 0 | 0 | 0.0% | 0 | 1 | 1 | 0.0 | 0 | 2 | 0 | 0 | 0 |
| Total | 30 | – | – | – | 2305 | 76.8 | 807 | 1790 | 45.1% | 216 | 616 | 35.1% | 475 | 648 | 73.3% | 324 | 803 | 1127 | 37.5 | 462 | 553 | 347 | 202 | 112 |
| Opponents | 30 | – | – | – | 1951 | 65.0 | 661 | 1683 | 39.3% | 202 | 637 | 31.7% | 427 | 591 | 72.3% | 280 | 731 | 1011 | 33.7 | 345 | 572 | 432 | 135 | 92 |

Legend
| GP | Games played | GS | Games started | Avg | Average per game |
| FG | Field-goals made | FGA | Field-goal attempts | Off | Offensive rebounds |
| Def | Defensive rebounds | A | Assists | TO | Turnovers |
| Blk | Blocks | Stl | Steals | High | Team high |

== Awards & milestones ==
=== Weekly awards ===
Zeke Nnaji

- 4x Pac-12 Freshman Player of the Week, (Nov. 11 & 18, Jan. 20, Feb. 17)
- Malone Finalist

Nico Mannion

- Wooden Legacy MVP
- Wooden Legacy All-Tournament Team
- Pac-12 Freshman Player of the Week, (Dec. 2)

Chase Jeter

- Wooden Legacy All-Tournament Team

Dylan Smith

- Wooden Legacy All-Tournament Team

=== Pac-12 Conference honors ===
Stone Gettings

- Pac-12 Men's Basketball Scholar-Athlete of the Year

Zeke Nnaji

- Pac-12 Freshman Player of the Year
- All-Pac-12 First Team

Nico Mannion

- All-Pac-12 Second Team

== See also ==
2019–20 Arizona Wildcats women's basketball team
