= 2019–20 Colorado Buffaloes men's basketball team =

American college basketball season

2019–20 Colorado Buffaloes men's basketball

MGM Resorts Main Event Heavyweight champions
- Conference: Pac-12 Conference
- Record: 21–11 (10–8 Pac-12)
- Head coach: Tad Boyle (10th season)
- Assistant coaches: Mike Rhon; Bill Grier; Anthony Coleman
- Home arena: CU Events Center

2019–20 Pac-12 Conference men's basketball standings
	Conf.				Overall
Team	W		L	PCT	W		L	PCT
No. 13 Oregon	13	–	5	.722	24	–	7	.774
UCLA	12	–	6	.667	19	–	12	.613
USC	11	–	7	.611	22	–	9	.710
Arizona State	11	–	7	.611	20	–	11	.645
Arizona	10	–	8	.556	21	–	11	.656
Colorado	10	–	8	.556	21	–	11	.656
Stanford	9	–	9	.500	20	–	12	.625
Oregon State	7	–	11	.389	18	–	13	.581
Utah	7	–	11	.389	16	–	15	.516
California	7	–	11	.389	14	–	18	.438
Washington State	6	–	12	.333	16	–	16	.500
Washington	5	–	13	.278	15	–	17	.469
Note: The 2020 Pac-12 Tournament was canceled prior to the quarterfinals due to the COVID-19 pandemic. Rankings from AP poll

The 2019–20 Colorado Buffaloes men's basketball team represented the University of Colorado in the 2019–20 NCAA Division I men's basketball season. They were led by head coach Tad Boyle in his tenth season at Colorado. The Buffaloes played their home games at CU Events Center in Boulder, Colorado as members of the Pac-12 Conference. They finished the season 21–11, 10–8 in Pac-12 play to finish in a tie for fifth place. They lost in the first round of the Pac-12 tournament to Washington State.

== Previous season ==
The Buffaloes finished the 2018–19 season 23–13, 10–8 in Pac-12 play to finish in a 3-way tie for fourth place. They defeated California and Oregon State in the first round and quarterfinals of the Pac-12 tournament before losing in the semifinals to Washington. They received an invitation to the National Invitation Tournament where they defeated Dayton in the first round, Norfolk State in the second round before losing to Texas in the quarterfinals.

== Off-season ==
=== Departures ===
Name	Num	Pos.	Height	Weight	Year	Hometown	Reason for departure
Namon Wright	13	G	6'5"	197	RS Senior	Los Angeles, CA	Graduated
Deleon Brown	14	G	6'4"	165	Junior	Grand Rapids, MI	Transferred to Grand Valley State

=== Incoming transfers ===
Name	Num	Pos.	Height	Weight	Year	Hometown	Previous school
Maddox Daniels	3	G/F	6'6"	200	Junior	Suwanee, GA	Junior college transferred from Florida SouthWestern State

=== 2019 recruiting class ===
College recruiting
Name	Hometown	School	Height	Weight	Commit date
Keeshawn Barthelemy; PG	Montreal, QC	Thornhill Secondary School	6 ft 2 in (1.88 m)	165 lb (75 kg)	Aug 30, 2019
Keeshawn Barthelemy; PG	Recruit ratings: Scout: Rivals: 247Sports: ESPN:				
Overall recruit ranking:
Note: In many cases, Scout, Rivals, 247Sports, On3, and ESPN may conflict in their listings of height and weight.; In these cases, the average was taken. ESPN grades are on a 100-point scale.; Sources: "2019 Colorado Commits". Rivals.; "2019 Team Ranking". Rivals.

=== 2020 Recruiting class ===
College recruiting (2020)
Name	Hometown	School	Height	Weight	Commit date
Dominique Clifford; SG	Colorado Springs, CO	Thomas B. Doherty High School	6 ft 4 in (1.93 m)	N/A	Sep 20, 2019
Dominique Clifford; SG	Recruit ratings: Scout: Rivals: 247Sports: ESPN:				
Luke O'Brien; SG	Littleton, CO	Columbine High School	6 ft 6 in (1.98 m)	185 lb (84 kg)	Nov 10, 2018
Luke O'Brien; SG	Recruit ratings: Scout: Rivals: 247Sports: ESPN:				
Overall recruit ranking:
Note: In many cases, Scout, Rivals, 247Sports, On3, and ESPN may conflict in their listings of height and weight.; In these cases, the average was taken. ESPN grades are on a 100-point scale.; Sources: "2020 Colorado Commits". Rivals.; "2020 Team Ranking". Rivals.

=== 2021 Recruiting class ===
College recruiting (2021)
Name	Hometown	School	Height	Weight	Commit date
Lawson Lovering; C	Laramie, WY	Central High School	7 ft 0 in (2.13 m)	N/A	Oct 28, 2019
Lawson Lovering; C	Recruit ratings: Scout: Rivals: 247Sports: ESPN:				
Overall recruit ranking:
Note: In many cases, Scout, Rivals, 247Sports, On3, and ESPN may conflict in their listings of height and weight.; In these cases, the average was taken. ESPN grades are on a 100-point scale.; Sources: "2021 Colorado Commits". Rivals.; "2021 Team Ranking". Rivals.

== Roster ==
2019–20 Colorado Buffaloes men's basketball team
Players
Coaches

Pos.	#	Name	Height	Weight	Year	Previous school	Hometown
G	0	Shane Gatling	6 ft 2 in (1.88 m)	182 lb (83 kg)	Sr	Indian Hills CC	Baldwin, NY
G/F	1	Tyler Bey (C)	6 ft 7 in (2.01 m)	216 lb (98 kg)	Jr	Middlebrooks Academy	Las Vegas, NV
G	2	Daylen Kountz	6 ft 4 in (1.93 m)	191 lb (87 kg)	So	East HS	Denver, CO
G/F	3	Maddox Daniels	6 ft 6 in (1.98 m)	211 lb (96 kg)	Jr	Beverly Hills HS; Florida SouthWestern State	Suwanee, GA
G/F	5	D'Shawn Schwartz	6 ft 7 in (2.01 m)	232 lb (105 kg)	Jr	Sand Creek HS	Colorado Springs, CO
F	10	Alexander Strating	6 ft 7 in (2.01 m)	228 lb (103 kg)	RS Jr	American School of The Hague	Wassenaars, Netherlands
G	11	Keeshawn Barthelemy (redshirt)	6 ft 2 in (1.88 m)	163 lb (74 kg)	Fr	Thornlea Secondary School	Montreal, QC
G	12	AJ Martinka (W)	6 ft 5 in (1.96 m)	210 lb (95 kg)	Jr	Stanwood HS	Stanwood, WA
F	15	Jakub Dombek	6 ft 11 in (2.11 m)	210 lb (95 kg)	RS Fr	Get Better Academy	Ostrava, Czech Republic
F	21	Evan Battey	6 ft 8 in (2.03 m)	262 lb (119 kg)	RS So	Villa Park HS	Los Angeles, CA
F	23	Lucas Siewert	6 ft 10 in (2.08 m)	232 lb (105 kg)	RS Sr	Brennan HS	Joinville, Brazil
G	24	Elijah Parquet	6 ft 3 in (1.91 m)	195 lb (88 kg)	So	West Brook HS	Beaumont, TX
G	25	McKinley Wright IV (C)	6 ft 0 in (1.83 m)	196 lb (89 kg)	Jr	Champlin Park HS	North Robbinsdale, MN
F	30	Frank Ryder (W)	6 ft 10 in (2.08 m)	232 lb (105 kg)	Jr	Fairview; San Diego	Boulder, CO
G	33	Aidan McQuade (W)	6 ft 2 in (1.88 m)	195 lb (88 kg)	Jr	Loveland HS	Loveland, CO
G	34	Benan Ersek (W)	6 ft 2 in (1.88 m)	185 lb (84 kg)	So	Kent Denver School	Vienna, Austria
F/C	35	Dallas Walton	7 ft 0 in (2.13 m)	235 lb (107 kg)	RS Jr	Arvada West HS	Arvada, CO

Head coach

- Tad Boyle (Kansas)

Assistant coach(es)

- Mike Rohn (McPherson)
- Bill Grier (Oregon)
- Anthony Coleman (Long Beach State)

Legend

- (C) Team captain
- (S) Suspended
- (I) Ineligible
- (W) Walk-on
- Injured
- Current redshirt

Roster

== Schedule and results ==
Date time, TV	Rank^{#}	Opponent^{#}	Result	Record	Site (attendance) city, state
Exhibition
October 26, 2019*; 5:00 pm		Pomona-Pitzer	W 87–56	–	CU Events Center (1,372); Boulder, CO
November 6, 2019*; 1:00 am		vs. Tsinghua	W 109–42	–	Suzhou Sports Center; Suzhou, China
Non-conference regular season
November 8, 2019*; 8:30 pm, ESPN2		vs. Arizona State; Pac-12 China Game	W 81–71	1–0	Baoshan Sports Centre (4,328); Shanghai, China
November 16, 2019*; 8:00 pm, P12N	No. 25	San Diego	W 71–53	2–0	CU Events Center (7,713); Boulder, CO
November 18, 2019*; 7:00 pm, P12N	No. 23	UC Irvine; MGM Resorts Main Event Campus Site Game	W 69–53	3–0	CU Events Center (5,904); Boulder, CO
November 24, 2019*; 6:00 pm, ESPN3	No. 23	vs. Wyoming; MGM Resorts Main Event Heavyweight semifinal	W 56–41	4–0	T-Mobile Arena; Paradise, NV
November 26, 2019*; 9:30 pm, ESPN2	No. 21	vs. Clemson; MGM Resorts Main Event Heavyweight championship	W 71–67	5–0	T-Mobile Arena; Paradise, NV
November 30, 2019*; 7:00 pm, P12N	No. 21	Sacramento State	W 59–45	6–0	CU Events Center (6,170); Boulder, CO
December 4, 2019*; 8:00 pm, P12N	No. 20	Loyola Marymount	W 76–64	7–0	CU Events Center (6,169); Boulder, CO
December 7, 2019*; 5:00 pm, ESPN2	No. 20	at No. 2 Kansas	L 58–72	7–1	Allen Fieldhouse (16,300); Lawrence, KS
December 10, 2019*; 7:00 pm, P12N	No. 24	Northern Iowa	L 76–79	7–2	CU Events Center (6,570); Boulder, CO
December 13, 2019*; 6:00 pm, CBSSN	No. 24	at Colorado State	W 56–48	8–2	Moby Arena (6,629); Fort Collins, CO
December 19, 2019*; 6:30 pm, P12N		Prairie View A&M	W 83–64	9–2	CU Events Center (6,082); Boulder, CO
December 21, 2019*; 4:30 pm, CBSSN		vs. No. 13 Dayton; Chicago Legends	W 78–76 ^{OT}	10–2	United Center; Chicago, IL
December 29, 2019*; 6:00 pm, P12N		Iona	W 99–54	11–2	CU Events Center (6,753); Boulder, CO
Pac-12 regular season
January 2, 2020; 7:00 pm, ESPN2		No. 4 Oregon	W 74–65	12–2 (1–0)	CU Events Center (10,770); Boulder, CO
January 5, 2020; 4:00 pm, ESPNU		Oregon State	L 68–76	12–3 (1–1)	CU Events Center (7,309); Boulder, CO
January 12, 2020; 4:00 pm, ESPNU	No. 25	Utah	W 91–52	13–3 (2–1)	CU Events Center (8,017); Boulder, CO
January 16, 2020; 7:00 pm, ESPN2	No. 20	at Arizona State	W 68–61	14–3 (3–1)	Desert Financial Arena (9,479); Tempe, AZ
January 18, 2020; 12:30 pm, FOX	No. 20	at Arizona	L 54–75	14–4 (3–2)	McKale Center (14,279); Tucson, AZ
January 23, 2020; 8:00 pm, P12N	No. 23	Washington State	W 78–56	15–4 (4–2)	CU Events Center (7,864); Boulder, CO
January 25, 2020; 7:00 pm, FS1	No. 23	Washington	W 76–62	16–4 (5–2)	CU Events Center (9,521); Boulder, CO
January 30, 2020; 9:00 pm, ESPN2	No. 20	at UCLA	L 68–72	16–5 (5–3)	Pauley Pavilion (5,566); Los Angeles, CA
February 1, 2020; 8:30 pm, FS1	No. 20	at USC	W 78–57	17–5 (6–3)	Galen Center (5,736); Los Angeles, CA
February 6, 2020; 6:00 pm, P12N	No. 24	California	W 71–65	18–5 (7–3)	CU Events Center (6,656); Boulder, CO
February 8, 2020; 4:00 pm, P12N	No. 24	Stanford	W 81–74	19–5 (8–3)	CU Events Center (10,930); Boulder, CO
February 13, 2020; 7:00 pm, ESPN	No. 16	at No. 17 Oregon	L 60–68	19–6 (8–4)	Matthew Knight Arena (9,275); Eugene, OR
February 15, 2020; 8:00 pm, FS1	No. 16	at Oregon State	W 69–47	20–6 (9–4)	Gill Coliseum (4,953); Corvallis, OR
February 20, 2020; 7:00 pm, ESPN2	No. 18	USC	W 70–66	21–6 (10–4)	CU Events Center (10,027); Boulder, CO
February 22, 2020; 2:00 pm, CBS	No. 18	UCLA	L 63–70	21–7 (10–5)	CU Events Center (11,214); Boulder, CO
February 27, 2020; 7:00 pm, P12N	No. 21	at California	L 62–76	21–8 (10–6)	Haas Pavilion (5,134); Berkeley, CA
March 1, 2020; 4:00 pm, P12N	No. 21	at Stanford	L 64–72	21–9 (10–7)	Maples Pavilion (7,123); Stanford, CA
March 7, 2020; 12:30 pm, P12N		at Utah	L 72–74 ^{OT}	21–10 (10–8)	Jon M. Huntsman Center (10,886); Salt Lake City, UT
Pac-12 tournament
March 12, 2020; 9:30 pm, P12N	(6)	vs. (11) Washington State; First round	L 68–82	21–11	T-Mobile Arena (7,452); Paradise, NV
*Non-conference game. ^{#}Rankings from AP Poll. (#) Tournament seedings in parentheses. All times are in Mountain Time.

== Ranking movement ==
Ranking movements Legend: ██ Increase in ranking ██ Decrease in ranking — = Not ranked RV = Received votes
	Week																				
Poll	Pre	1	2	3	4	5	6	7	8	9	10	11	12	13	14	15	16	17	18	19	Final
AP	RV	25	23	21	20	24	RV	RV	RV	25	20	23	20	24	16	18	21	RV	—		Not released
Coaches	RV	—	25	24	21	23	RV	RV	RV	RV	21	RV	21	24	15	17	20	RV	RV	RV	

*AP does not release post-NCAA Tournament rankings.
