= Johnathan Loyd =

American basketball player (born 1991)

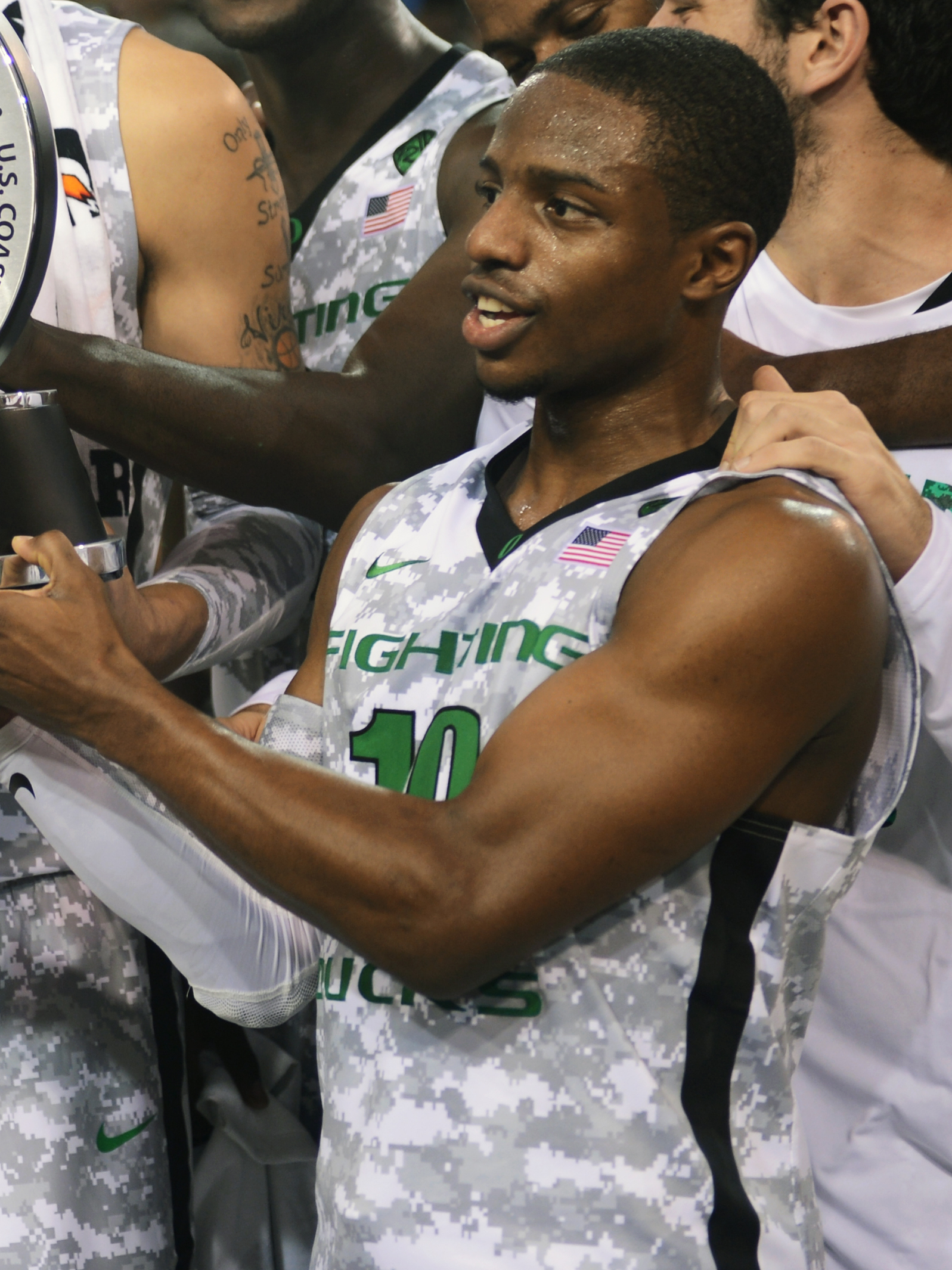
- Loyd with the Oregon Ducks men's basketball team at the 2013 Armed Forces Classic

Personal information
- Born: August 15, 1991 (age 35) Las Vegas, Nevada, U.S.
- Listed height: 5 ft 8 in (1.73 m)
- Listed weight: 165 lb (75 kg)

Career information
- High school: Bishop Gorman (Las Vegas, Nevada)
- College: Oregon (2010–2014)
- NBA draft: 2014: undrafted
- Playing career: 2014–present
- Position: Point guard
- Number: 10

Career history
- 2015–2016: ETB Wohnbau Baskets
- 2018–2019: Nevada Desert Dogs
- 2019–2020: Island Storm
- 2021: Kokomo BobKats

Career highlights
- Basketball: CBI champion (2011); Football: Pac-12 Conference champion (2014); Rose Bowl champion (2015)

Johnathan Loyd (born August 15, 1991) is an American former professional basketball player. He was a dual sport college athlete playing guard and wide receiver for the University of Oregon basketball and football teams, respectively.

== High school and college ==
Loyd played high school basketball and football at Bishop Gorman in Las Vegas, Nevada.

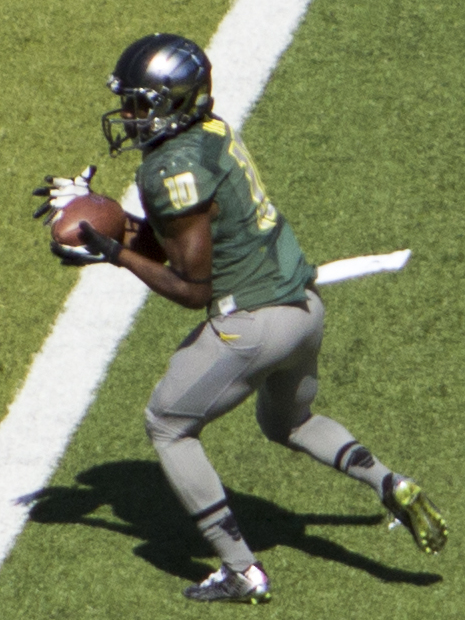
Loyd catching a touchdown for the Oregon Ducks football team in 2014

Loyd is the winningest player in the history of the University of Oregon men's basketball program with 97 career wins over 4 seasons. In 2013, the Ducks made a Sweet Sixteen appearance in the NCAA Tournament, their best showing in the tournament since the 2007 season.

== Professional career ==
After going undrafted in the 2014 NBA draft, Loyd In the summer of 2015 Loyd participated in the Four Nations international basketball tournament in China as a member of the Netscouts USA Men's All-Star basketball team.

In 2018, Loyd signed with the Nevada Desert Dogs of the North American Premier Basketball League.

On February 28, 2019, Loyd signed with the Island Storm of the National Basketball League of Canada.

In 2021, Loyd played for the Kokomo BobKats of The Basketball League.
