= Tony Woods (basketball) =

American basketball player

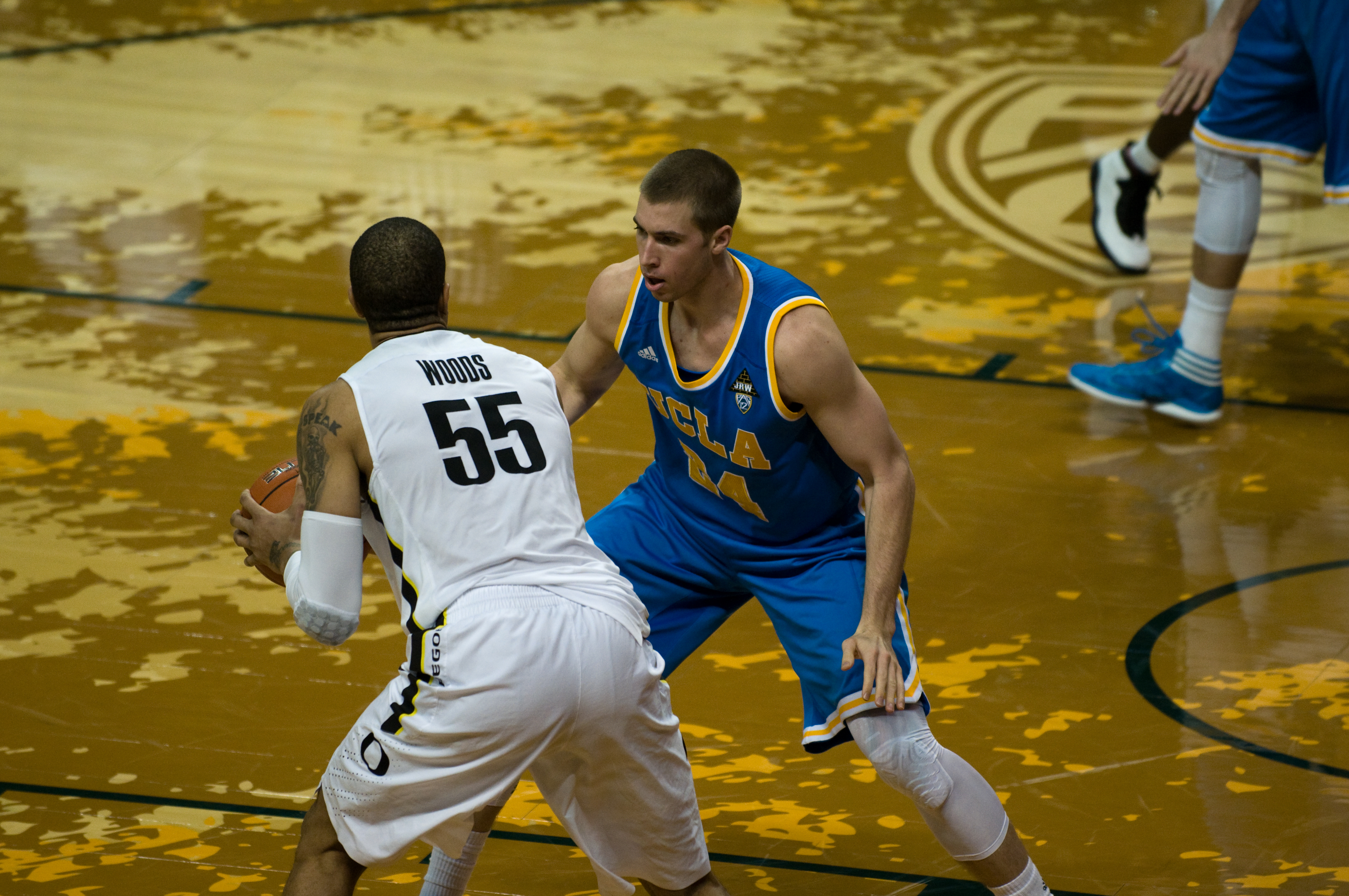
- Woods (55) playing for Oregon

Maroussi
- Position: Center
- League: Greek A2 Basket League

Personal information
- Born: January 24, 1990 (age 36) Rome, Georgia
- Listed height: 6 ft 11 in (2.11 m)
- Listed weight: 250 lb (113 kg)

Career information
- High school: Rome (Rome, Georgia)
- College: Wake Forest (2008–2010); Oregon (2011–2013)
- NBA draft: 2013: undrafted
- Playing career: 2013–present

Career history
- 2013–2014: Nea Kifissia
- 2014: Energia Rovinari
- 2014–2015: Panionios
- 2015: APOEL
- 2015–2016: Apollon Patras
- 2017: Rilski Sportist
- 2017: Soles de Santo Domingo
- 2017: Panionios
- 2018: ETHA Engomis
- 2019: Omonoia
- 2019–2020: Žilina
- 2023–present: Maroussi

Career highlights
- Greek A2 Elite League champion (2023); Romanian Cup winner (2014); Fourth-team Parade All-American (2008)

Samuel Antonio "Tony" Woods Jr. (born January 24, 1990) is an American professional basketball player. Standing at 2.11 m (6 ft 11 in), he plays at the center position.

== High school ==
Woods attended and played high school basketball Rome High School, in Rome, Georgia and attended Jordan Brand Classic on 2008.

== College career ==
After graduating from Rome High School, Woods played two years of college basketball for Wake Forest University. Woods transferred and enrolled in Oregon. He had to sit out one season under NCAA rules.

== Professional career ==
On September 11, 2013, Woods joined Nea Kifissia of Greek Basket League.

With Nea Kifissia, he averaged 6.5 points and 4.2 rebounds per game, in 26 games,. He then continued his career in the Greek Basket League with Panionios.

With Panionios, Woods averaged 7 points and 4.9 rebounds per game. He continued his career with Apollon Patras.

Woods was the third leading scorer of Apollon Patras, in the Greek Basket League 2015–16 season, averaging 8.54 points per game.

On September 20, 2016, Woods joined the newly promoted Greek League team of Doxa Lefkadas, but he left the team without appearing in a single game with them. On January 4, 2017, he joined Rilski Sportist of the Bulgarian League. He left the team on March 31, 2017. On June 27, 2017, he joined Soles de Santo Domingo of the Puerto Rican Liga Nacional de Baloncesto.

He returned to Panionios for the 2017–18 season. Woods moved to Cyprus in 2019, signing with Omonoia. In six games he averaged 11.7 points, 11.3 rebounds, 1.2 assists, 1.2 steals and 1.8 blocks per game. Woods spent the 2019–20 season with Žilina of the Slovak Basketball League, averaging 6.3 points and 7.6 rebounds per game. On September 6, 2020, he signed with Ionikos Nikaias of the Greek Basket League.
