= Malcolm Armstead =

American basketball player (born 1989)

No. 11 – Prishtina
- Position: Point guard
- League: Kosovo Basketball Superleague; Liga Unike

Personal information
- Born: 1 August 1989 (age 37) Florence, Alabama, U.S.
- Listed height: 6 ft 0 in (1.83 m)
- Listed weight: 190 lb (86 kg)

Career information
- High school: Central Park Christian (Birmingham, Alabama)
- College: Chipola College (2008–2009); Oregon (2009–2011); Wichita State (2012–2013)
- NBA draft: 2013: undrafted
- Playing career: 2013–present

Career history
- 2013–2015: Krka
- 2015: Avtodor Saratov
- 2015: AEK Athens
- 2016: İstanbul BB
- 2016–2017: Yeşilgiresun Belediye
- 2017: Neptūnas
- 2017–2018: Rethymno Cretan Kings
- 2018: Büyükçekmece
- 2018–2019: Kymis
- 2019: Prishtina
- 2019–2020: Peja
- 2020: Gostivar
- 2020–2021: Fribourg Olympic
- 2021–2022: Kavala
- 2022–2023: Ylli
- 2023: Peja
- 2023–2024: Prishtina
- 2024–present: Ylli
- 2026–present: Prishtina

Career highlights
- Balkan League champion (2024); Swiss Basketball League champion (2021); Slovenian League champion (2014); 2× Slovenian Cup winner (2014, 2015); Slovenian Supercup winner (2014); Slovenian Supercup MVP (2014); ABA League Top Scorer (2015); All-ABA League Team (2015); MVC All-Newcomer Team (2013)

Malcolm Ray Armstead (born 1 August 1989) is an American-born naturalized Kosovan professional basketball player for Prishtina of the Kosovo Basketball Superleague. After playing college basketball for Chipola College, University of Oregon and Wichita State University Armstead entered the 2013 NBA draft but was not selected in the draft's two rounds.

== Professional career ==
After going undrafted in the 2013 NBA draft, Armstead signed his first professional contract in August 2013, with the Slovenian Basket League's Krka Novo Mesto for the 2013–14 season. On June 23, 2014 he re-signed with the club for the 2014–15 season.

On 10 June 2015, he signed with Avtodor Saratov of Russia for the 2014–15 season. On November 16, 2015, he left the club in order to sign with the Greek club AEK Athens for the rest of the 2015–16 Greek Basket League season. On December 25, 2015, he parted ways with AEK, and signed with İstanbul BB of Turkey for the rest of the season.

On 25 August 2016, Armstead signed with Turkish club Yeşilgiresun Belediye for the 2016–17 BSL season.

On 22 September 22, 2017, Armstead signed with Neptūnas Klaipėda. In late October 2017, he left Neptūnas and signed with Greek club Rethymno Cretan Kings.

Armstead spent the 2020–21 season with Fribourg Olympic of the Swiss Basketball League, averaging 14.2 points, 4.7 assists, 1.8 steals and 1.7 rebounds per game. On 28 August 2021, he signed with Kavala B.C.

== National team career ==
In addition to playing for the Kosovan national team, he also played for the Romanian national team.

== College statistics ==
Year	Team	GP	GS	MPG	FG%	3P%	FT%	RPG	APG	SPG	BPG	PPG
2009–10	Oregon	32	27	31.7	.452	.333	.725	2.6	6.3	2.0	.1	17.9
2010–11	Oregon	38	23	27.5	.430	.323	.795	2.9	7.4	2.3	.0	17.2
2012–13	Wichita State	39	39	28.5	.394	.355	.827	3.8	8.0	1.9	.1	15.6
