= N'Faly Dante =

Malian basketball player (born 2001)

No. 16 – Westchester Knicks
- Position: Center
- League: NBA G League

Personal information
- Born: 19 October 2001 (age 25) Bamako, Mali
- Listed height: 6 ft 11 in (2.11 m)
- Listed weight: 230 lb (104 kg)

Career information
- High school: Sunrise Christian Academy (Bel Aire, Kansas)
- College: Oregon (2019–2024)
- NBA draft: 2024: undrafted
- Playing career: 2024–present

Career history
- 2024–2025: Houston Rockets
- 2024–2025: →Rio Grande Valley Vipers
- 2025–2026: Atlanta Hawks
- 2026–present: Westchester Knicks

Career highlights
- 2× First-team All-Pac-12 (2023, 2024); Pac-12 All-Defensive Team (2024); Pac-12 tournament MOP (2024); 2× Nike Hoop Summit (2018, 2019)
- Stats at NBA.com
- Stats at Basketball Reference
Medals
Men's basketball
Representing Mali
FIBA Africa U16 Championship
Gold medal – first place	2017 Mauritius

N'Faly Dante (born 19 October 2001) is a Malian professional basketball player for the Westchester Knicks of the NBA G League. He played college basketball for the Oregon Ducks. He was a five-star recruit who attended Sunrise Christian Academy in Bel Aire, Kansas.

== High school career ==
Dante attended Sunrise Christian Academy in Bel Aire, Kansas. In his junior season, he averaged 16 points, nine rebounds, and three assists per game, leading his team to a 22–6 record and its first GEICO Nationals appearance.

=== Recruiting ===
Dante was a consensus five-star recruit, one of the best centers in his class, and the number one recruit from Kansas. On 13 August 2019, in a letter addressed to his mother on The Players' Tribune, he announced his reclassification to the 2019 class and committed to play college basketball for Oregon.

College recruiting
Name	Hometown	School	Height	Weight	Commit date
N'Faly Dante; C	Bamako, Mali	Sunrise Christian Academy (KS)	6 ft 11 in (2.11 m)	230 lb (100 kg)	Aug 13, 2019
N'Faly Dante; C	Recruit ratings: Rivals: 247Sports: ESPN: (89)				
Overall recruit ranking: Rivals: — 247Sports: 15 ESPN: 29
Note: In many cases, Scout, Rivals, 247Sports, On3, and ESPN may conflict in their listings of height and weight.; In these cases, the average was taken. ESPN grades are on a 100-point scale.; Sources: "Oregon 2019 Basketball Commitments". Rivals.; "2019 Oregon Ducks Recruiting Class". ESPN.; "2019 Team Ranking". Rivals.

== College career ==
On 15 October 2019, Dante was ruled ineligible to start the 2019–20 season because the National Collegiate Athletic Association (NCAA) missed his clearance date. He reenrolled at the University of Oregon on 14 December. Dante made his debut for the Ducks on 18 December, scoring 11 points in an 81–48 win over Montana. On 18 January 2020, Dante injured his knee in a game against Washington and missed several weeks. On 9 December 2020, Dante scored a career-high 22 points in an 87–66 win over Florida A&M. On 19 December, he was ruled out for the season with a torn ACL. Dante averaged 8.2 points and 5.8 rebounds per game, shooting 65.6 percent from the field as a sophomore.

== Professional career ==
After going undrafted in the 2024 NBA draft, Dante signed a two-way contract with the Houston Rockets on 9 July 2024. On 3 March 2025, Dante made his NBA debut in a 137–128 defeat against the Oklahoma City Thunder, recording 10 points, nine rebounds, two blocks and one assist.

On 18 August 2025, it was announced the Atlanta Hawks had signed Dante to a two-year, $4.4 million offer sheet. He made four appearances for the Hawks, averaging 0.8 points and 1.8 rebounds. On 23 December, it was announced that Dante would miss the remainder of the season after suffering a torn ACL in his right knee. On 5 February 2026, Dante was waived by Atlanta.

== National team career ==
With Mali at the 2016 FIBA Under-17 World Championship in Zaragoza, Spain, Dante averaged 2.8 points and 4.3 rebounds in 9.2 minutes per game, as his team finished in 15th place. He was named to the roster for Mali at the 2017 FIBA Under-16 African Championship in Mauritius, where his team captured the gold medal, but he did not record playing time.

== Career statistics ==
Legend
GP	Games played	GS	Games started	MPG	Minutes per game
FG%	Field goal percentage	3P%	3-point field goal percentage	FT%	Free throw percentage
RPG	Rebounds per game	APG	Assists per game	SPG	Steals per game
BPG	Blocks per game	PPG	Points per game	**Bold**	Career high

=== NBA ===
Year	Team	GP	GS	MPG	FG%	3P%	FT%	RPG	APG	SPG	BPG	PPG
2024–25	Houston	**4**	0	**12.8**	**.769**	–	.800	**5.3**	**.5**	.3	**1.3**	**6.0**
2025–26	Atlanta	**4**	0	3.8	.250	–	**1.000**	1.8	.0	**.5**	.0	.8
Career		8	0	8.3	.647	–	.833	3.5	.3	.4	.6	3.4

=== College ===
Year	Team	GP	GS	MPG	FG%	3P%	FT%	RPG	APG	SPG	BPG	PPG
2019–20	Oregon	12	0	13.6	.627	—	.400	2.8	.6	.9	.6	5.8
2020–21	Oregon	6	6	17.7	.656	—	.438	5.8	.2	1.5	1.2	8.2
2021–22	Oregon	**32**	27	20.0	.675	—	.588	6.3	.7	.7	1.0	8.1
2022–23	Oregon	31	**30**	26.2	.614	—	**.617**	8.4	1.1	1.1	1.4	13.4
2023–24	Oregon	22	21	**31.5**	**.695**	—	.613	**9.2**	**1.6**	**1.7**	**1.9**	**17.0**
Career		103	84	23.4	.654	—	.591	7.1	1.0	1.1	1.3	11.3
