= CU Events Center =

Arena in Boulder

- "The Keg"
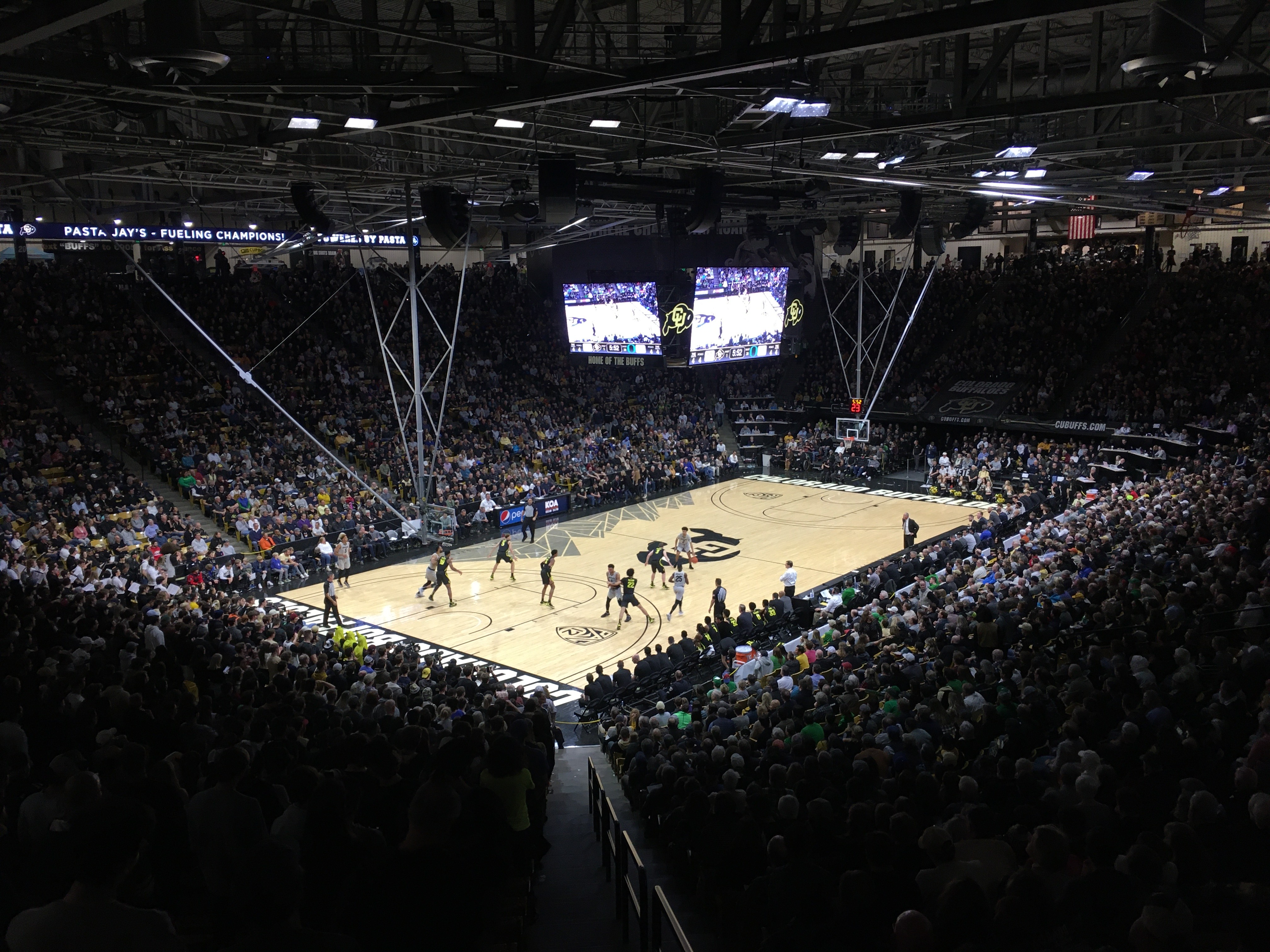
- Against Oregon in January 2020

- Location in Colorado Location in the United States
- Former names: Coors Events Center (2008–2018); Coors Events/Conference; Center (1990–2008); CU Events/Conference; Center (1979–1990)
- Location: 950 Regent Drive; Boulder, Colorado, U.S.
- Coordinates: 40.0047°N 105.2606°W
- Owner: University of Colorado
- Operator: University of Colorado
- Capacity: 11,064
- Surface: Hardwood

Construction
- Groundbreaking: October 1977
- Opened: November 8, 1979; 47 years ago
- Cost: $7,579,756 ($33.6 million in 2025)
- Architect: Sink Combs Dethlefs
- Structural engineers: John A. Martin & Associates

Tenants
- Colorado Buffaloes (basketball & volleyball)

The CU Events Center is an 11,064-seat multi-purpose arena in the Western United States, on the main campus of the University of Colorado in Boulder, Colorado. Opened 47 years ago in 1979, it is home to the Colorado Buffaloes men's and women's basketball teams and women's volleyball of the Big 12 Conference. The playing surface is named the Sox Walseth Court in honor of the former Buffaloes men's and women's basketball head coach.

The building is an eight-sided concrete structure, with three levels: arena floor, service level, and the concourse level. Single-tiered inside, it replaced Balch Fieldhouse, the current home of the indoor track and field team located directly adjacent to Folsom Field. The approximate elevation at street level is 5,400 feet (1,600 m) above sea level making it the college basketball arena with the 5th highest elevation in the country.

== History ==
The venue was initially called the CU Events/Conference Center and was renamed to the Coors Events/Conference Center in September 1990 after the Coors family, in recognition of a $5 million gift from the Adolph Coors Foundation. In 2008 with the addition of the basketball offices to the building on the service level, the "Conference" was removed from the name as there were no longer conference rooms in the building. Although the naming agreement with the Coors Foundation had long expired, the Coors name remained on the building until 2018, when it was renamed the CU Events Center. At the time, the CU athletic department announced it was actively seeking a new naming rights partner.

On December 9, 1981, the Grateful Dead played their last Boulder show at the then-named "CUC."

It is the highest indoor arena in the Big XII Conference, approximately 600 feet (180 m) above the Huntsman Center at Utah. It is one of only three basketball arenas in a major conference that uses roof-mounted retractable goals: the other arenas that are also equipped with this style of basket are Cameron Indoor Stadium at Duke and Maples Pavilion at Stanford.

== Improvements ==
The most dramatic changes since the building was opened have come since 2008. After the 2007-08 basketball seasons, the CEC underwent a $200,000 "Floor Lift", in which a permanent maple surface with technology to reduce injuries and fatigue was installed.

In April 2008, the men's and women's basketball offices were relocated to the CEC from Folsom Field second level where the conference rooms were previously located.

In the summer of 2010, two new video boards were installed in the southwest and northeast corners. Along with the new video boards and as part of the new practice facility, a new production suite was built for the department's BuffVision office. The production room controls the video boards at both the Coors Events Center and Folsom Field.

A new 44,000-square-foot (4,100 m^{2}) practice facility was opened in August 2011 for volleyball and basketball. The building was just the second athletic facility in the nation and third on CU's campus to earn LEED Platinum Certification, the highest possible by the internationally recognized system developed by the U.S. Green Building Council.

In August 2013, a video room for the men's and women's basketball teams was opened for the first time, giving both teams additional meeting space and the ability to watch film more efficiently.

In February 2014, a new weight room was finished in the remaining space on the second level where the conference rooms were once located, adjacent to the basketball offices that were relocated in 2008.

In August 2017, a new high-definition video and scoreboard was installed at the center of the ceiling of the CEC. The scoreboard has shown a live feed of games as well as statistics and replays.

== See also ==
- List of NCAA Division I basketball arenas
