= Will Richardson (basketball) =

American basketball player (born 1999)

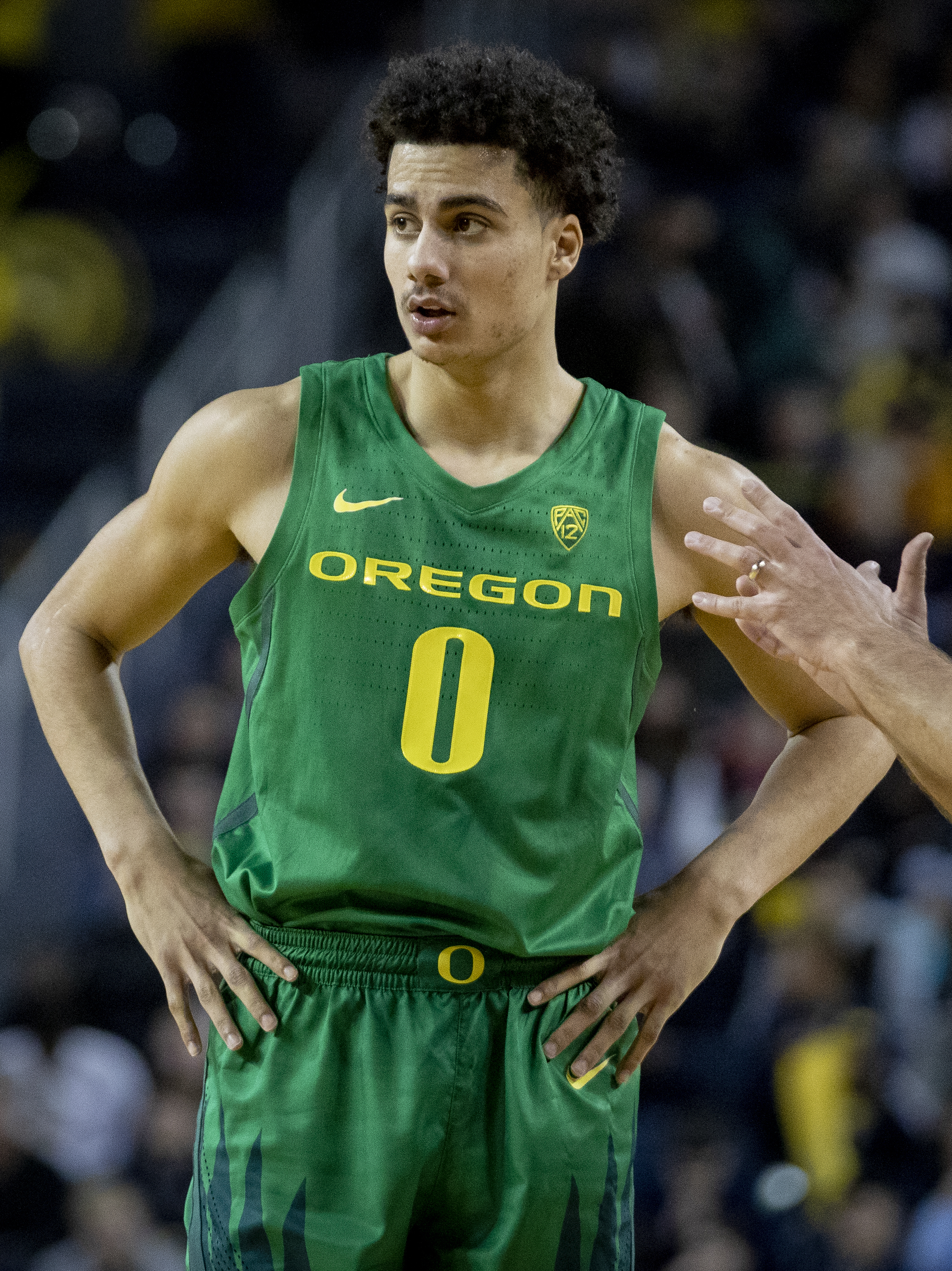
- Richardson with Oregon in 2019

Free agent
- Position: Point guard / shooting guard

Personal information
- Born: September 3, 1999 (age 27) Hinesville, Georgia, U.S.
- Listed height: 6 ft 5 in (1.96 m)
- Listed weight: 170 lb (77 kg)

Career information
- High school: Bradwell Institute (Hinesville, Georgia); Liberty County (Hinesville, Georgia); Oak Hill Academy (Mouth of Wilson, Virginia)
- College: Oregon (2018–2023)
- NBA draft: 2023: undrafted
- Playing career: 2023–present

Career history
- 2023–2025: Grand Rapids Gold
- 2025: Winnipeg Sea Bears
- 2025: Xinjiang Flying Tigers

Career highlights
- Second-team All-Pac-12 (2022)
- Stats at NBA.com
- Stats at Basketball Reference

William Tyrell Richardson (born September 3, 1999) is an American professional basketball player who last played for Xinjiang Flying Tigers of the Chinese Basketball Association (CBA). He played college basketball for the Oregon Ducks. He was named second-team All-Pac-12 as a senior in 2022.

== High school career ==
Richardson first played high school basketball at Bradwell Institute in his hometown of Hinesville, Georgia. For his sophomore season, he transferred to Liberty County High School in Hinesville. Richardson was teammates with Davion Mitchell and Richard LeCounte, and helped his team win the Class 4A state championship. As a junior, he averaged 31.4 points, 8.6 rebounds, 5.3 assists and 2.6 steals per game, leading Liberty County to the state semifinals. Richardson posted a school-record 55 points and 14 rebounds against Bradwell Institute. He was named Region 2-3A Player of the Year. Richardson moved to Oak Hill Academy in Mouth of Wilson, Virginia for his senior season. He played in the Jordan Brand Classic. A four-star recruit ranked no. 38 in his class by ESPN, he committed to playing college basketball for Oregon over offers from Gonzaga and Georgia.

== College career ==
As a freshman at Oregon, Richardson came off the bench and averaged six points, 2.5 assists and 2.4 rebounds per game. He averaged 11 points, 3.7 rebounds and 2.3 assists per game as a sophomore, leading the Pac-12 Conference in three-point field goal percentage (46.9). Richardson underwent left thumb surgery before his junior season and missed his first 12 games of the season. On March 7, 2021, he scored a career-high 22 points in an 80–67 win over Oregon State. As a junior, Richardson averaged 11.3 points, 3.9 assists and 3.4 rebounds per game. He was named second-team All-Pac-12 as a senior.

== Professional career ==
=== Grand Rapids Gold (2023–2025) ===
After going undrafted in the 2023 NBA draft, Richardson joined the Grand Rapids Gold on October 30, 2023 where he averaged 7.0 points, 2.1 rebounds, and 2.9 assists in 17.8 minutes.

On October 8, 2024, Richardson signed with the Denver Nuggets, but was waived on October 16. On October 28, he rejoined Grand Rapids.

== Career statistics ==
Legend
GP	Games played	GS	Games started	MPG	Minutes per game
FG%	Field goal percentage	3P%	3-point field goal percentage	FT%	Free throw percentage
RPG	Rebounds per game	APG	Assists per game	SPG	Steals per game
BPG	Blocks per game	PPG	Points per game	**Bold**	Career high

=== College ===
Year	Team	GP	GS	MPG	FG%	3P%	FT%	RPG	APG	SPG	BPG	PPG
2018–19	Oregon	**38**	12	24.3	.468	.278	.675	2.4	2.5	1.1	**.2**	6.0
2019–20	Oregon	31	13	30.3	**.479**	**.469**	**.848**	**3.7**	2.3	**1.4**	**.2**	11.0
2020–21	Oregon	16	16	**35.5**	.443	.403	.738	3.4	**3.9**	1.1	.1	11.3
2021–22	Oregon	30	**30**	32.3	.454	.388	.772	**3.7**	3.6	1.3	.0	**14.1**
Career		115	71	29.6	.462	.392	.757	3.2	2.9	1.2	.1	10.2
