= Stagg High School (Stockton, California) =

Amos Alonzo Stagg High School

Location
- 1621 Brookside Road; Stockton, California 95207; United States; 37°59′00″N 121°19′30″W

Information
- School type: Public secondary school
- Established: 1958
- School district: Stockton Unified School District
- Principal: Brett Toliver
- Staff: 79.35 (FTE)
- Grades: 9–12
- Enrollment: 1,758 (2023-2024)
- Student to teacher ratio: 22.16
- Colors: Brown and gold
- Nickname: Delta Kings, Delta Queens
- Newspaper: Stagg Online
- Website: School website

Amos Alonzo Stagg High School, or Stagg High School, is a public, four-year high school located at 1621 Brookside Road in Stockton, California, United States. It is part of the Stockton Unified School District. The school was dedicated on February 25, 1959, and was named after college football coach Amos Alonzo Stagg.

== Campus ==
Stagg has 117 classrooms, a multipurpose room, campus cafe, 2 gyms, state-of-the art weight room, and an administration building. The main campus was built in 1959. Five portable classrooms were constructed in 2000 for class size reduction. Due to a bond measure passed (Measure Q), much of the campus was upgraded to include weatherized classrooms, a new football field, softball field, and baseball field. Created using all-weather materials for a long lasting facility. A parking area was added in the back of the school, and there are future plans to redo the swimming pool, tennis courts, and another classroom and administration building.

== Athletics ==
Stagg competes in Division I in the CIF. They are a member of the San Joaquin Athletic Association and part of the Sac-Joaquin Section.

== Stabbing ==
On April 18, 2022, a 15-year-old female student was stabbed to death on the school’s property, allegedly by a 52-year-old man. It was described by police as likely random.

== Notable alumni ==
- Dallas Braden 2001, MLB Major League Baseball pitcher
- Bob Garibaldi, 1960, MLB Major League Baseball pitcher
- Lonzell Hill 1983, American Football League NFL wide receiver, New Orleans Saints
- Chris Isaak 1974, actor and singer
- George Visger 1975, NFL lineman, spokesperson for brain injuries
- Kenny Wooten NBA player
