= Wooddale High School =

High school in Tennessee, United States

Coordinates: 35.05715°N 89.8919°W

Location
- 5151 Scottsdale Avenue; Memphis, Shelby County, Tennessee 38118; United States

Information
- Type: Public high school
- Principal: Latonja Robinson
- Staff: 29.99 (FTE)
- Enrollment: 651 (2022-23)
- Student to teacher ratio: 21.71
- Colors: Red, white and royal blue
- Nickname: Cardinals
- Website: https://wooddale-hs.scsk12.org/

Wooddale High School is a high school in Memphis, Tennessee, United States. Wooddale is a part of Shelby County Schools. Their mascot is the Cardinal. The school is located at 5151 Scottsdale Avenue.

Notable alumni include former NFL defensive tackle Dontari Poe.
