= Kenny Wooten =

American basketball player (born 1998)

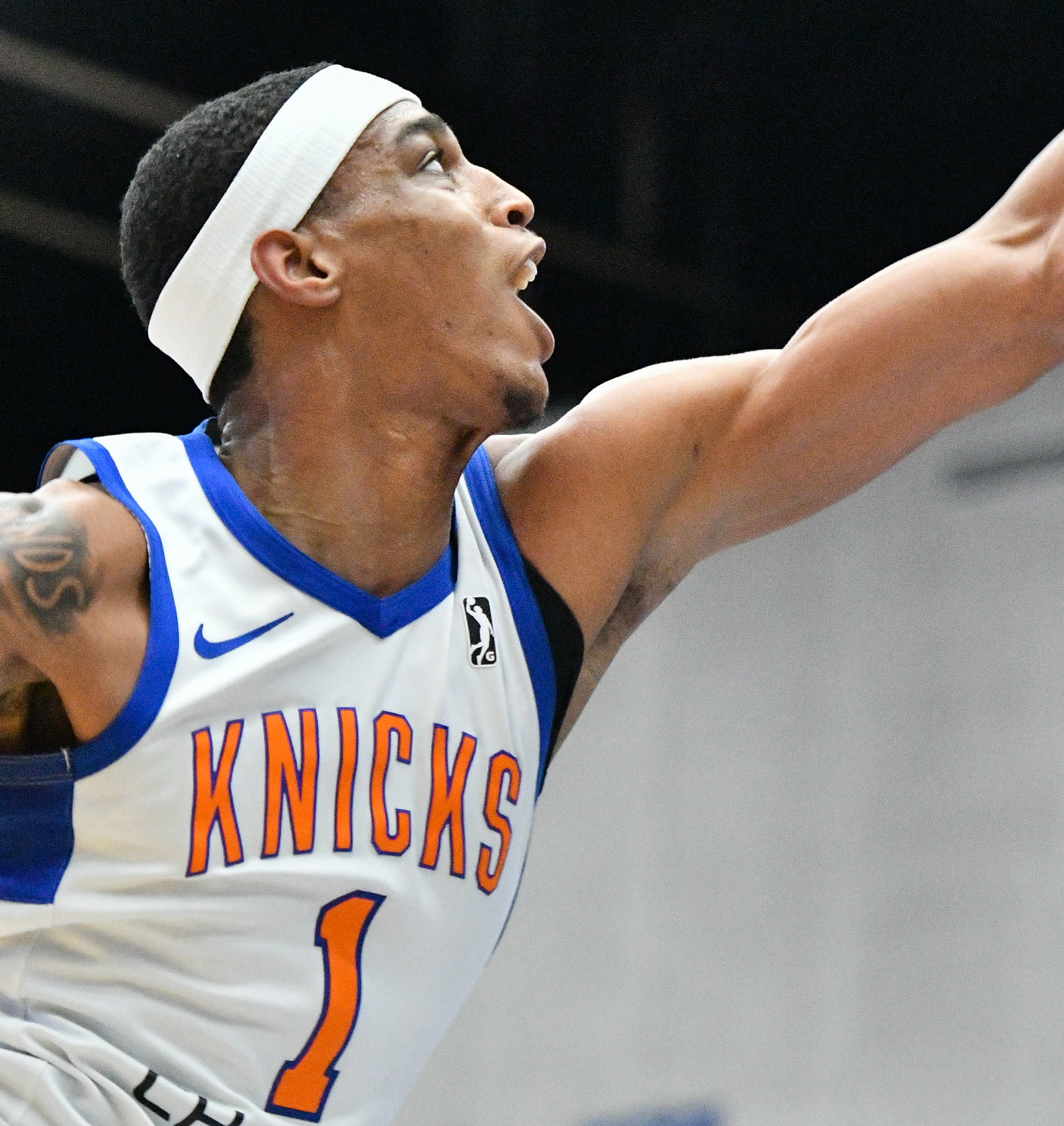
- Wooten with the Westchester Knicks

No. 1 – Bashkimi
- Position: Power forward
- League: Kosovo Basketball Superleague

Personal information
- Born: April 17, 1998 (age 28) Stockton, California, U.S.
- Listed height: 6 ft 9 in (2.06 m)
- Listed weight: 235 lb (107 kg)

Career information
- High school: Stagg (Stockton, California); Manteca (Manteca, California); Trinity International School (Las Vegas, Nevada)
- College: Oregon (2017–2019)
- NBA draft: 2019: undrafted
- Playing career: 2019–present

Career history
- 2019–2020: Westchester Knicks
- 2020–2021: Rio Grande Valley Vipers
- 2021–2022: Maine Celtics
- 2022–2023: Raptors 905
- 2023–2024: Paksi Atomerőmű
- 2024–2025: Ulaanbaatar TLG
- 2025–2026: Central Club
- 2026–present: Bashkimi

Career highlights
- NBA G League All-Defensive Team (2020); 2× Pac-12 All-Defensive team (2018, 2019)
- Stats at NBA.com
- Stats at Basketball Reference

Kenneth Wooten Jr. (born April 17, 1998) is an American professional basketball player for Bashkimi of the Kosovo Basketball Superleague. He played college basketball for the Oregon Ducks. Wooten is known for his elite athleticism, and high vertical jump skillset.

== Early life ==
Wooten was born and grew up in Stockton, California and initially attended Stagg High School before transferring to Manteca High School after his sophomore year. As a senior, he averaged 13.6 points, 10.9 rebounds, and 4.0 blocks per game and scored 26 points with 18 rebounds and nine blocks in the Buffaloes win over Ayala High School in the 2016 State title game. Rated a four-star recruit, Wooten initially signed a national letter of intent to play college basketball at Nevada before asking to be released from his commitment in order to re-open his recruiting due to coaching changes at the school. He then transferred to Trinity International School in Las Vegas, Nevada for a postgraduate year in order to reclassify for the class of 2017. After initially committing to Arizona State, Wooten de-committed and accepted a scholarship to play at Oregon.

== College career ==
As a freshman, Wooten averaged 6.4 points, 4.5 rebounds and a Pac-12 Conference-leading 2.6 blocks per game and was named to the conference's All-Defensive team. Wooten's 92 blocked shots was the third most in a single season by an Oregon player. He averaged 6.3 points, 4.8 rebounds, and 2.2 blocks per game and was again named to the Pac-12 All-Defensive team in his sophomore season. Wooten had a career-high 20 points on December 8, 2018, in an 84–61 win over Omaha. Following the end of the season, Wooten announced that he would forgo his final two seasons of NCAA eligibility to enter the 2019 NBA draft. Despite only playing two seasons, Wooten left Oregon as the Ducks' third all-time leading shot blocker with 166 blocks.

== Professional career ==
After going undrafted in the 2019 NBA draft, Wooten joined the New York Knicks for the 2019 NBA Summer League and on July 20, 2019, the Knicks signed him to an Exhibit 10 contract. Wooten was waived by the Knicks on October 19, 2019, and joined the team's NBA G League affiliate, the Westchester Knicks. The Knicks signed Wooten to a two-way contract for two years on January 14, 2020. However, he did not play a game for the Knicks in the 2019–20 season as he suffered a thumb injury requiring surgery in late February 2020. He averaged 7.7 points, 6.1 rebounds, and 3.6 blocks per game while shooting 65.1% from the field for Westchester. On November 19, 2020, the Knicks waived Wooten.

On November 21, 2020, Houston Rockets claimed him off waivers, but was waived during training camp. He was then added to the Rockets' G League affiliate, the Rio Grande Valley Vipers where he averaged 6.4 points, 5.7 rebounds and 1.1 assists.

On April 10, 2021, Wooten signed with Filou Oostende of the BNXT League.

On August 22, 2021, Wooten signed with Ironi Ness Ziona of the Israeli Basketball Super League (IBSL). However, he was cut on September 16. On October 23, he signed with the Maine Celtics. On February 6, 2022, Wooten was waived after suffering a season-ending injury.

=== Raptors 905 (2022–2023) ===
On October 15, 2022, Wooten was traded from the Maine Celtics to the Raptors 905. On October 17, 2022, Wooten signed with the Raptors 905 of the G League. On January 17, 2023, Wooten was waived.

On January 27, 2023, Wooten was acquired by the Salt Lake City Stars, but was waived four days later before playing for Salt Lake.

=== Atomerőmű SE (2023–2024) ===
On November 23, 2023, Wooten signed with the Atomerőmű SE of the Nemzeti Bajnokság I/A.

=== Ulaanbaatar TLG (2024–2025) ===
In November 2024, Wooten joined the Ulaanbaatar TLG of The League.

On January 7, 2025, Wooten signed with the Homenetmen Beirut of the Lebanese Basketball League.

== Career statistics ==
Legend
GP	Games played	GS	Games started	MPG	Minutes per game
FG%	Field goal percentage	3P%	3-point field goal percentage	FT%	Free throw percentage
RPG	Rebounds per game	APG	Assists per game	SPG	Steals per game
BPG	Blocks per game	PPG	Points per game	**Bold**	Career high

=== College ===
Year	Team	GP	GS	MPG	FG%	3P%	FT%	RPG	APG	SPG	BPG	PPG
2017–18	Oregon	**36**	10	19.8	**.681**	.000	.594	4.5	.3	**.6**	**2.6**	**6.4**
2018–19	Oregon	34	**27**	**24.0**	.589	.000	**.672**	**4.8**	**.6**	.4	2.2	6.3
Career		70	37	21.8	.634	.000	.633	4.7	.5	.5	2.4	6.4
