= Mike Williams (wide receiver, born 1994) =

American football player (born 1994)

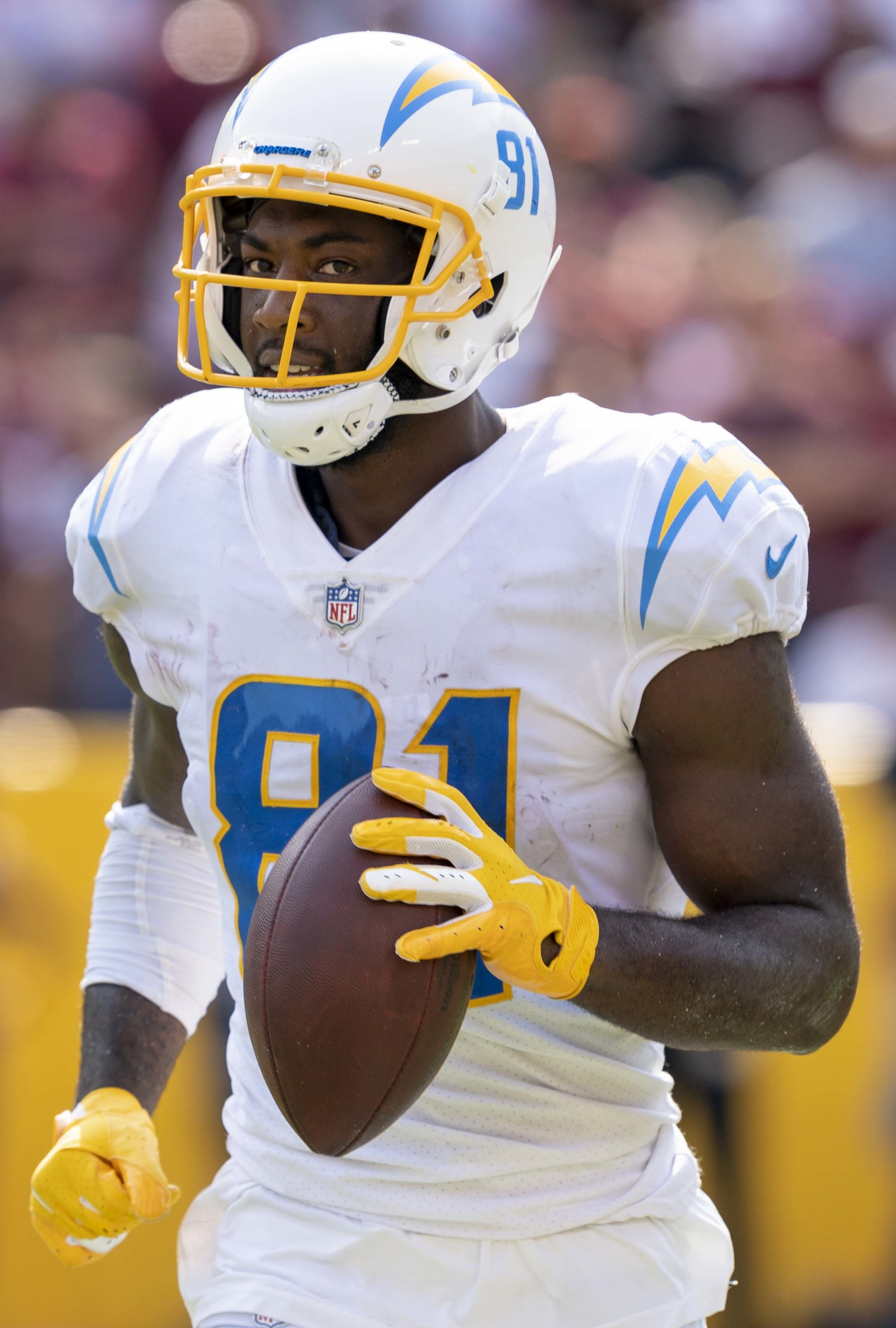
- Williams with Los Angeles Chargers in 2021

No. 81, 18
- Position: Wide receiver

Personal information
- Born: October 4, 1994 (age 32); Holly Hill, South Carolina, U.S.
- Listed height: 6 ft 4 in (1.93 m)
- Listed weight: 218 lb (99 kg)

Career information
- High school: Lake Marion (Santee, South Carolina)
- College: Clemson (2013–2016)
- NFL draft: 2017: 1st round, 7th overall pick

Career history
- Los Angeles Chargers (2017–2023); New York Jets (2024); Pittsburgh Steelers (2024); Los Angeles Chargers (2025)*
- * Offseason or practice squad member only

Awards and highlights
- CFP national champion (2016); First-team All-ACC (2016); Second-team All-ACC (2014)

Career NFL statistics
- Receptions: 330
- Receiving yards: 5,104
- Receiving touchdowns: 32
- Stats at Pro Football Reference

Michael K. Williams (born October 4, 1994) is an American former professional football player who was a wide receiver for eight seasons in the National Football League (NFL), primarily with the Los Angeles Chargers. He played college football for the Clemson Tigers and was selected by the Chargers with the seventh overall pick in the 2017 NFL draft. He also played for the New York Jets and Pittsburgh Steelers.

== Early life ==
Williams attended Lake Marion High School & Technology Center in Santee, South Carolina, where he played on the football team. He had 66 receptions for 1,296 yards and 11 touchdowns as a junior, and he had 60 receptions for 1,395 yards and 10 touchdowns as a senior. Williams was rated by Rivals.com as a four-star recruit. He committed to Clemson University to play college football.

== College career ==
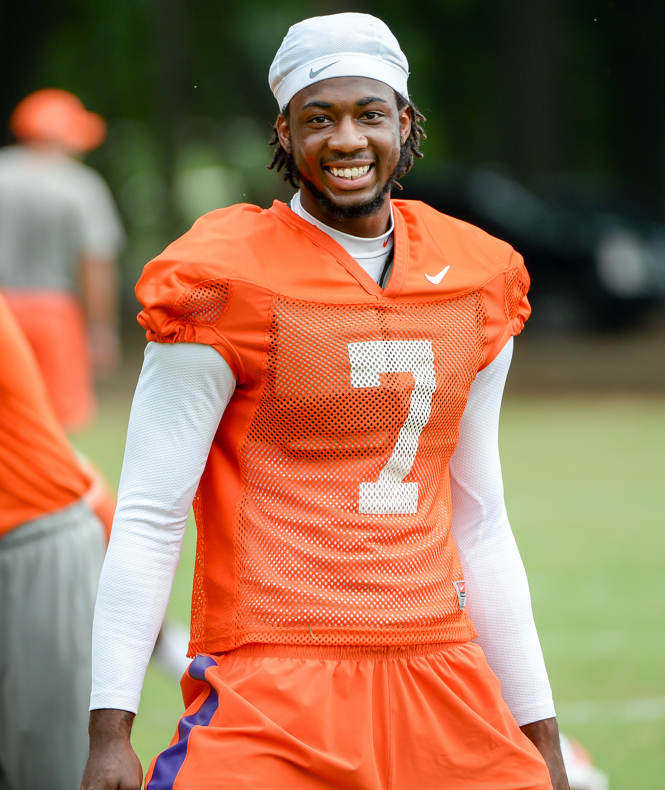
Williams at Clemson in 2015

Williams played in all 13 games as a true freshman in 2013, making three starts. He finished with 20 receptions for 316 yards and three touchdowns. Williams returned as a starter his sophomore year in 2014. He finished the year with 57 receptions for 1,030 yards and six touchdowns.

In 2015, in the first game of the season against the Wofford Terriers, Williams fractured a bone in his neck after colliding with the goal post just as he was catching a touchdown pass from quarterback Deshaun Watson on his team's first offensive series of the game. He sat out the rest of the season and received redshirt status.

In 2016 as a redshirt junior, Williams returned to his starting role and started all 15 games for Clemson, recording team highs in receptions (98), yards (1,361), and touchdowns (11). He caught touchdown passes in 9 games (including 3 against rival South Carolina) and had over 100 yards receiving in 5 games. In the National Championship Game against Alabama, Williams caught eight passes for 94 yards and one touchdown. Williams completed his bachelor's degree in sociology in December 2016.

On January 10, 2017, hours after Clemson defeated Alabama 35–31 for the national championship, Williams announced that he would forgo his senior year and enter the 2017 NFL draft.

== Professional career ==
=== Pre-draft ===
Coming out of Clemson, Williams was considered a top prospect and projected as a first round pick by the majority of draft experts and analysts. He attended the NFL Combine, but only performed the bench press, vertical jump, and broad jump. He performed the 40-yard dash, 20-yard dash, and 10-yard dash at Clemson's Pro Day and also ran positional drills. Williams was ranked the best wide receiver in the draft by ESPN, the second best wide receiver by Pro Football Focus, the third best wide receiver by Sports Illustrated, and NFLDraftScout.com ranked him the third best wide receiver in the draft.

External videos
- Mike Williams' NFL Combine workout
- Mike Williams' Clemson Pro Day workout
- Williams's Pro Day 40-yard dash

Pre-draft measurables
Height	Weight	Arm length	Hand span	Wingspan	40-yard dash	10-yard split	20-yard split	Vertical jump	Broad jump	Bench press	Wonderlic
6 ft 3 5/8 in (1.92 m)	218 lb (99 kg)	33 3/8 in (0.85 m)	9 3/8 in (0.24 m)	6 ft 7 3/4 in (2.03 m)	4.54 s	1.66 s	2.58 s	32.5 in (0.83 m)	10 ft 1 in (3.07 m)	15 reps	17
All values from NFL Combine/Clemson's Pro Day

External videos
- Chargers select Williams seventh overall
- Mike Williams' 2017 NFL Draft Profile

=== Los Angeles Chargers (first stint) ===
==== 2017 season ====
The Los Angeles Chargers selected Williams in the first round with the seventh overall pick in the 2017 NFL draft. He was the second wide receiver selected (No. 5, Corey Davis) in the draft. On May 11, 2017, the Chargers signed Williams to a fully guaranteed four-year, $19.74 million contract with a signing bonus of $12.50 million.

Williams participated in rookie minicamp, but missed organized team activities and was expected to miss the start of training camp due to a mild herniated disc in his lower back. On July 30, 2017, it was announced by head coach Anthony Lynn that Williams was expected to miss the entire training camp due to his back injury.

He was inactive for the first six games of the regular season and made his professional regular season debut in Week 6. He made his first career reception on a 15-yard pass by quarterback Philip Rivers in the fourth quarter of their 17–16 victory at the Oakland Raiders, before being tackled by safety Karl Joseph. On November 19, 2017, Williams caught a season-high five passes for 38-yard during a 54–24 victory against the Buffalo Bills in Week 11. Williams was sidelined for the Chargers' Week 13 win against the Cleveland Browns after sustaining a knee injury in the first quarter of their 28–6 victory at the Dallas Cowboys the previous week. He finished his rookie season in 2017 with 11 receptions for 95 yards in ten games and one start.

==== 2018 season ====
In Week 2, Williams recorded his first professional touchdown in the 31–20 victory over the Bills. The following week, against the Los Angeles Rams, he had four receptions for 81 receiving yards and two touchdowns. In Week 15 against the Kansas City Chiefs, Williams had his best game of the season as he caught seven passes for 76 yards and two touchdowns, plus rushing for 19 yards for a touchdown. He caught a late go-ahead two-point conversion with four seconds left in a 29–28 victory despite being down 14–28 with five minutes left. For his performance in Week 15, Williams was named AFC Offensive Player of the Week. He finished the 2018 season with 43 receptions for 664 receiving yards and ten receiving touchdowns.

==== 2019 season ====
In Week 9 against the Green Bay Packers, Williams caught three passes for a season-high 111 yards in the 26–11 win. This was Williams' first game with at least 100 receiving yards of the season. In Week 13 against the Denver Broncos, Williams caught five passes for 117 yards in the 23–20 loss. Overall, in the 2019 season, Williams recorded 49 receptions for 1,001 receiving yards and two receiving touchdowns. He led the NFL in yards per reception with 20.4 in the 2019 season.

==== 2020 season ====
On April 30, 2020, the Chargers exercised the fifth-year option on Williams' contract. In Week 5 against the New Orleans Saints on Monday Night Football, Williams recorded five catches for 109 yards and two touchdowns during the 30–27 overtime loss. In Week 16 against the Broncos, Williams recorded his first career interception off a pass thrown by Drew Lock on a Hail-Mary attempt with no time left in the game to secure a 19–16 win for the Chargers. In the regular season finale against the Chiefs, he had six receptions for 108 receiving yards and a touchdown in the 38–21 victory. Williams finished the 2020 season with 48 receptions for 756 receiving yards and five receiving touchdowns in 15 games.

==== 2021 season ====
In Week 3, against the Chiefs, Williams had seven receptions for 122 receiving yards and two receiving touchdowns in the 30–24 victory. In Week 5, against the Browns, he had eight receptions for 165 receiving yards and two receiving touchdowns in the 47–42 victory. In Week 18, against the Las Vegas Raiders, he had nine receptions for 119 receiving yards and one touchdown in the 35–32 overtime loss. Williams had a breakout season in 2021, setting career highs in receptions (76), targets (129), and yards (1,146) while scoring nine touchdowns. He showed rapport with ascending Chargers quarterback Justin Herbert, particularly to start the season, totaling six receiving touchdowns and 471 receiving yards in the Chargers' first five games.

On March 8, 2022, Williams signed a three-year, $60 million contract extension with the Chargers.

==== 2022 season ====
In Week 2, against the Chiefs, Williams had eight receptions for 113 receiving yards and one receiving touchdown in the 27–24 loss. In Week 4, against the Houston Texans, he had seven receptions for 120 receiving yards in the 34–24 victory. In the following game, against the Browns, he had ten receptions for 134 receiving yards in the 30–28 victory. In Week 14, against the Miami Dolphins, he had six receptions for 116 receiving yards and one receiving touchdown in the 23–17 victory. In the final three minutes of the last game of the regular season against the Denver Broncos, Williams suffered a small transverse process fracture in his back, which kept him out of the team's only post-season game, which they lost to the Jacksonville Jaguars. Williams recorded 63 receptions for 895 receiving yards and four receiving touchdowns in 13 games in the 2022 season.

==== 2023 season ====
In Week 3, against the Minnesota Vikings, Williams suffered an ACL tear in the third quarter, and was ruled out for the season. He ended his 2023 campaign with 19 receptions for 249 yards and one touchdown, which Williams received from fellow wide receiver Keenan Allen in Week 3.

On March 13, 2024, Williams was released by the Chargers.

=== New York Jets ===
On March 19, 2024, Williams signed a one-year contract with the New York Jets. In Week 6, Williams was criticized by quarterback Aaron Rodgers for running the wrong route on a pass intended for him, which resulted in a game-clinching interception in a loss to the Buffalo Bills. In nine games with the Jets, Williams finished with 12 receptions for 166 yards.

=== Pittsburgh Steelers ===
On November 5, 2024, the Jets traded Williams to the Pittsburgh Steelers in exchange for a fifth-round pick in the 2025 NFL draft. Five days after being traded, Williams played in the Steelers' Week 10 matchup against the Washington Commanders, where he caught a 32-yard game-winning touchdown late in the fourth quarter as the Steelers won 28–27. Over his time with the Jets and Steelers in the 2024 season, he had 21 receptions for 298 yards and a touchdown.

=== Los Angeles Chargers (second stint) ===
On March 12, 2025, Williams returned to the Los Angeles Chargers on a one-year, $6 million deal. On July 14, Williams was placed on the PUP list. On July 17, Williams informed the Chargers of his retirement from professional football.

== Career statistics ==
=== NFL ===
Legend
	Led the league
**Bold**	Career high

==== Regular season ====
Year	Team	Games		Receiving					Rushing					Fumbles	
Year	Team	GP	GS	Rec	Yds	Avg	Lng	TD	Att	Yds	Avg	Lng	TD	Fum	Lost
2017	LAC	10	1	11	95	8.6	20	0	—	—	—	—	—	0	0
2018	LAC	**16**	5	43	664	15.4	55	**10**	**7**	**28**	**4.0**	**19**	**1**	0	0
2019	LAC	15	**15**	49	1,001	**20.4**	56	2	1	2	2.0	2	0	0	0
2020	LAC	15	11	48	756	15.8	64	5	1	1	1.0	1	0	0	0
2021	LAC	**16**	14	**76**	**1,146**	15.1	**72**	9	—	—	—	—	—	0	0
2022	LAC	13	13	63	895	14.2	55	4	—	—	—	—	—	0	0
2023	LAC	3	3	19	249	13.1	49	1	1	3	3.0	3	0	0	0
2024	NYJ	9	3	12	166	13.8	22	0	—	—	—	—	—	0	0
2024	PIT	9	2	9	132	14.7	32	1	—	—	—	—	—	0	0
Total		106	67	330	5,104	15.5	72	32	10	34	3.4	19	1	0	0

==== Postseason ====
Year	Team	Games		Receiving					Rushing					Fumbles	
Year	Team	GP	GS	Rec	Yds	Avg	Lng	TD	Att	Yds	Avg	Lng	TD	Fum	Lost
2018	LAC	2	2	7	110	15.7	28	0	0	0	0.0	0	0	0	0
2022	LAC	0	0	DNP due to injury											
2024	PIT	1	0	1	37	37.0	37	0	0	0	0.0	0	0	0	0
Total		3	2	8	147	18.4	37	0	0	0	0.0	0	0	0	0

=== College ===
Season	Team	GP	Receiving			
Season	Team	GP	Rec	Yds	Avg	TD
2013	Clemson	10	20	316	15.8	3
2014	Clemson	12	57	1,030	18.1	6
2015	Clemson	1	2	20	10.0	1
2016	Clemson	15	98	1,361	13.9	11
Total		38	177	2,727	15.4	21
