= Jaden McDaniels =

American basketball player (born 2000)

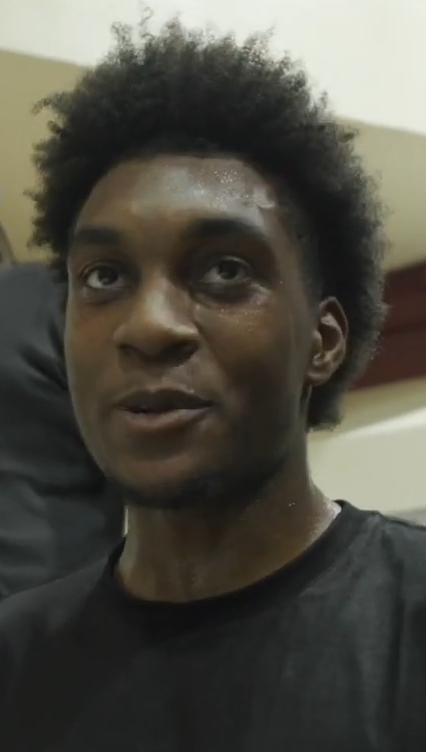
- McDaniels at the Crawsover Pro-Am in 2023

No. 3 – Minnesota Timberwolves
- Position: Small forward / power forward
- League: NBA

Personal information
- Born: September 29, 2000 (age 26) Federal Way, Washington, U.S.
- Listed height: 6 ft 9 in (2.06 m)
- Listed weight: 185 lb (84 kg)

Career information
- High school: Federal Way (Federal Way, Washington)
- College: Washington (2019–2020)
- NBA draft: 2020: 1st round, 28th overall pick
- Drafted by: Los Angeles Lakers
- Playing career: 2020–present

Career history
- 2020–present: Minnesota Timberwolves

Career highlights
- NBA All-Defensive Second Team (2024); McDonald's All-American (2019)
- Stats at NBA.com
- Stats at Basketball Reference

Jaden McDaniels (born September 29, 2000) is an American professional basketball player for the Minnesota Timberwolves of the National Basketball Association (NBA). He played college basketball for the Washington Huskies. He attended Federal Way High School in Federal Way, Washington, where he was named a McDonald's All-American and Washington Gatorade Player of the Year as a senior. McDaniels was a five-star recruit and one of the top players in the 2019 class. He is the younger brother of basketball player Jalen McDaniels.

== Early life ==
McDaniels played basketball for Federal Way High School in Federal Way, Washington. As a freshman, he was teammates with his older brother Jalen and helped Federal Way win its second straight Class 4A state championship. McDaniels averaged 2.4 points and 1.8 rebounds per game on the varsity team and was forced to shoot with his left hand due to a right elbow injury. In his first two years, he helped his team win 63 consecutive games, the longest win streak in state history since 1977.

As a junior, McDaniels guided Federal Way to a runner-up finish at the 4A state tournament. In the season, he averaged 21.3 points, 10 rebounds, 4.6 assists, and 3.3 blocks per game and earned USA Today All-USA Washington first team honors. In May 2018, McDaniels saw breakout success at the Nike Elite Youth Basketball League (EYBL) with Seattle Rotary, bolstering his position as a top recruit in the 2019 class.

On January 25, 2019, as a senior, he recorded 51 points against Todd Beamer High School, breaking the school single-game scoring record held by NBA player Donny Marshall. McDaniels averaged 23.3 points, 10 rebounds, four assists and two blocks per game in his senior season, leading his team to third place at the 4A state tournament. He earned Class 4A Player of the Year and Washington Gatorade Player of the Year recognition. McDaniels played in the McDonald's All-American Game and Jordan Brand Classic.

By the end of his high-school career, McDaniels was considered a consensus five-star recruit and the best power forward in the 2019 class. ESPN and Rivals ranked him among the top 10 players in his class. On May 22, 2019, McDaniels committed to play college basketball for Washington. He had also received strong interest from Kentucky during the recruiting process.

College recruiting
Name	Hometown	School	Height	Weight	Commit date
Jaden McDaniels; PF	Federal Way, WA	Federal Way (WA)	6 ft 10 in (2.08 m)	185 lb (84 kg)	May 21, 2019
Jaden McDaniels; PF	Recruit ratings: Rivals: 247Sports: ESPN: (96)				
Overall recruit ranking: Rivals: 7 247Sports: 13 ESPN: 7
Note: In many cases, Scout, Rivals, 247Sports, On3, and ESPN may conflict in their listings of height and weight.; In these cases, the average was taken. ESPN grades are on a 100-point scale.; Sources: "Washington 2019 Basketball Commitments". Rivals.; "2019 Washington Huskies Recruiting Class". ESPN.; "2019 Team Ranking". Rivals.

== College career ==
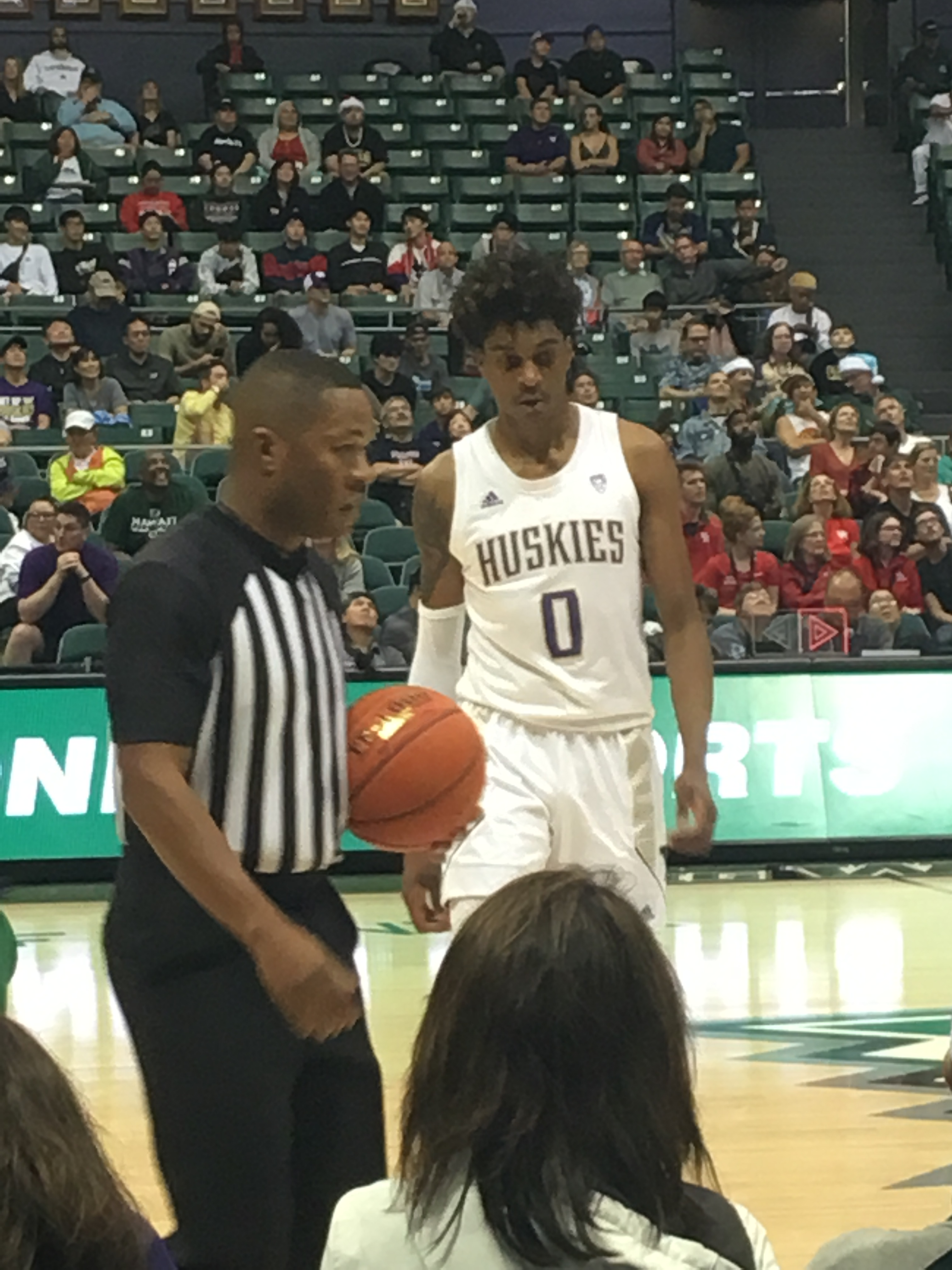
McDaniels (right) at the 2019 Diamond Head Classic

Heading in to the college season, McDaniels was considered a possible number-one pick in the 2020 NBA draft. In his collegiate debut at Washington, a 67–64 upset win over Baylor, he scored 18 points and seven rebounds. He finished the season with a high of 22 points against Ball State. As a freshman, McDaniels averaged 13 points and 5.8 rebounds per game while starting 21 games but began coming off the bench midway through conference play. After the season, he declared for the 2020 NBA draft.

== Professional career ==
=== Minnesota Timberwolves (2020–present) ===
In the 2020 NBA draft, the Los Angeles Lakers selected McDaniels in the first round with the 28th overall selection. He was then traded to the Oklahoma City Thunder along with Danny Green for Dennis Schröder and later traded to the Minnesota Timberwolves, along with the draft rights of Immanuel Quickley, in exchange for Aleksej Pokuševski.

On December 27, 2020, McDaniels made his NBA debut recording 6 points and 1 rebound in 8 minutes off the bench in a 127-91 loss against the Los Angeles Lakers.

On April 9, 2023, McDaniels sustained a fracture in his right hand after he punched a wall following a 113–108 win over the New Orleans Pelicans.

On October 23, 2023, McDaniels signed a five-year contract extension with the Timberwolves worth $136 million. During an on-court altercation at a November 14 game between the Timberwolves and the Golden State Warriors, McDaniels pulled Klay Thompson over and ripped his jersey, which started a brawl. Timberwolves center Rudy Gobert attempted to pull Thompson away from McDaniels, but Draymond Green put Gobert into a chokehold. McDaniels was ejected from the game and fined for the incident.

On April 23, 2024, McDaniels led all scorers with a playoff career-high 25 points in a 105–93 victory over the Phoenix Suns in Game 2 of the first round. About a year before the playoff matchup, Anthony Edwards uttered how the Suns "got KD, but we got Jaden McDaniels". The Timberwolves went on to sweep the Suns and advance to the second round.

McDaniels was named to the 2023-2024 NBA All-Defensive Second Team.

The 2024-25 season saw McDaniels begin to take an offensive leap, notching a career-high 30 points in a 114–98 victory against the Portland Trail Blazers on February 8, 2025. He was instrumental in the Timberwolves' historic 25-point comeback against the first-place Oklahoma City Thunder on February 24, converting a three-point play to send the game to overtime. He led all Minnesota scorers with 27 points as the Timberwolves won 131–128 in overtime. McDaniels started all 82 games for the Timberwolves during the season, posting averages of 12.2 points, 5.7 rebounds, and 2.0 assists.

On April 25, 2025, McDaniels scored a then-playoff career-high 30 points in a 116–104 victory over the Los Angeles Lakers in Game 3 of the first round. The Timberwolves later won the series 4–1 and advanced to the second round.

On March 30, 2026, McDaniels was diagnosed with left knee patella tendinopathy and a bone bruise. He would not require surgery.

On April 30, 2026, in Game 6 of the first round, McDaniels scored a playoff career-high 32 points along with 10 rebounds in a 110–98 closeout victory over the Denver Nuggets.

== Career statistics ==
Legend
GP	Games played	GS	Games started	MPG	Minutes per game
FG%	Field goal percentage	3P%	3-point field goal percentage	FT%	Free throw percentage
RPG	Rebounds per game	APG	Assists per game	SPG	Steals per game
BPG	Blocks per game	PPG	Points per game	**Bold**	Career high
*	Led the league

=== NBA ===
==== Regular season ====
Year	Team	GP	GS	MPG	FG%	3P%	FT%	RPG	APG	SPG	BPG	PPG
2020–21	Minnesota	63	27	24.0	.447	.364	.600	3.7	1.1	.6	**1.0**	6.8
2021–22	Minnesota	70	31	25.8	.460	.317	.803	4.2	1.1	.7	.8	9.2
2022–23	Minnesota	79	79	30.6	**.517**	.398	.736	3.9	1.9	.9	**1.0**	12.1
2023–24	Minnesota	72	71	29.2	.489	.337	.722	3.1	1.4	.9	.6	10.5
2024–25	Minnesota	**82***	**82***	**31.9**	.477	.330	.813	**5.7**	2.0	**1.3**	.9	12.2
2025–26	Minnesota	73	73	31.7	.515	**.412**	**.835**	4.2	**2.7**	1.1	**1.0**	**14.8**
Career		439	363	29.1	.489	.359	.774	4.2	1.7	.9	.9	11.1

==== Playoffs ====
Year	Team	GP	GS	MPG	FG%	3P%	FT%	RPG	APG	SPG	BPG	PPG
2022	Minnesota	6	0	21.6	**.529**	**.500**	.833	2.8	.7	.3	**1.8**	9.3
2024	Minnesota	**16**	**16**	33.6	.514	.429	.771	3.8	1.1	.9	1.1	12.2
2025	Minnesota	15	15	33.1	.515	.382	**.893**	5.6	1.5	**1.3**	.9	14.7
2026	Minnesota	12	12	**33.8**	.443	.238	.857	**5.8**	**2.4**	.5	.7	**16.3**
Career		49	43	32.0	.491	.376	.836	4.7	1.5	.8	1.0	13.6

=== College ===
Year	Team	GP	GS	MPG	FG%	3P%	FT%	RPG	APG	SPG	BPG	PPG
2019–20	Washington	31	21	31.1	.405	.339	.763	5.8	2.1	.8	1.4	13.0
Career		31	21	31.1	.405	.339	.763	5.8	2.1	.8	1.4	13.0

== Personal life ==
McDaniels's older brother, Jalen McDaniels, played basketball for Federal Way High School, where he was a four-star recruit, before joining the University of Washington at the college level. He was selected by the Charlotte Hornets in the second round of the 2019 NBA draft. McDanielsʼs mother is a cousin of former NBA player Juwan Howard. Both his father, Will McDaniels, and his mother, Angela Jackson, are originally from Chicago.. In June of 2024, Jaden and his partner, Allison Audrey, welcomed his first son Mekhi.
