= Charlie Taumoepeau =

American football player (born 1998)

No. 89
- Position: Fullback

Personal information
- Born: March 25, 1998 (age 28); Seattle, Washington, U.S.
- Listed height: 6 ft 2 in (1.88 m)
- Listed weight: 245 lb (111 kg)

Career information
- High school: Federal Way (WA)
- College: Portland State
- NFL draft: 2020: undrafted

Career history
- Dallas Cowboys (2020)*; Indianapolis Colts (2020)*; San Francisco 49ers (2020)*; Detroit Lions (2021); St. Louis BattleHawks (2023)*; Seattle Sea Dragons (2023); St. Louis BattleHawks (2024)*
- * Offseason or practice squad member only

Awards and highlights
- First-team All-Big Sky (2019)
- Stats at Pro Football Reference

Charlie Taumoepeau (born March 25, 1998) is an American former football fullback. He played college football at Portland State.

== Early life ==
Taumoepeau played high school football at Federal Way High School. He was not heavily recruited and unranked by 247sports.com coming out of high school. He committed to Portland State to play football.

== College career ==
Taumoepeau was named to the 2019 Big Sky Football All Conference Team following his senior season. Taumoepeau was also a participant in the 2020 Senior Bowl.

== Professional career ==
Pre-draft measurables
| Height | Weight | Arm length | Hand span | 40-yard dash | 20-yard shuttle | Three-cone drill | Vertical jump | Broad jump | Bench press |
|---|---|---|---|---|---|---|---|---|---|
| 6 ft 2 1/4 in (1.89 m) | 240 lb (109 kg) | 32 1/4 in (0.82 m) | 9 1/2 in (0.24 m) | 4.75 s | 4.27 s | 7.00 s | 36.5 in (0.93 m) | 10 ft 1 in (3.07 m) | 18 reps |
All values from NFL Combine

=== Dallas Cowboys ===
Taumoepeau signed with the Dallas Cowboys as an undrafted free agent on April 27, 2020. He was waived on September 2, 2020.

=== Indianapolis Colts ===
Taumoepeau signed with the Indianapolis Colts practice squad on September 8, 2020. He was released on September 22.

=== San Francisco 49ers ===
On September 30, 2020, Taumoepeau was signed to the San Francisco 49ers practice squad. He was released on October 6.

=== Detroit Lions ===
On May 17, 2021, Taumoepeau signed with the Detroit Lions. On August 16, 2021, he was placed on the non-football injury list after being injured in a car accident driven by ex-teammate Alex Brown. He was released on March 16, 2022.

=== Seattle Sea Dragons ===
On January 1, 2023, Taumoepeau was selected by the St. Louis BattleHawks in the 14th round of the 2023 XFL Supplemental Draft. On January 28, 2023, he was traded to the Seattle Sea Dragons. He appeared in 6 games with one start, making 5 receptions for 60 yards.

=== St Louis Battlehawks ===
On August 9, 2023, Taumoepeau was traded back to the St. Louis Battlehawks in exchange for linebacker Silas Kelly. He was not part of the roster after the 2024 UFL dispersal draft on January 15, 2024.
