= Alex Brown (cornerback) =

American football player (born 1996)

Profile
- Position: Cornerback

Personal information
- Born: August 30, 1996 (age 30); Holly Hill, South Carolina, U.S.
- Listed height: 5 ft 11 in (1.80 m)
- Listed weight: 170 lb (77 kg)

Career information
- High school: Lake Marion (Santee, South Carolina)
- College: South Carolina State (2014–2018)
- NFL draft: 2019: undrafted

Career history
- San Francisco 49ers (2019)*; Philadelphia Eagles (2019)*; New York Jets (2019)*; Kansas City Chiefs (2019–2020); Detroit Lions (2021)*; Edmonton Elks (2023)*
- * Offseason or practice squad member only

Awards and highlights
- Super Bowl champion (LIV); Second-team All-MEAC (2018)

Career NFL statistics
- Total tackles: 2
- Stats at Pro Football Reference

Alex Brown (born August 30, 1996) is an American former professional football player who was a cornerback in the National Football League (NFL). He played college football for the South Carolina State Bulldogs.

== College career ==
Brown was a five year member of the South Carolina State Bulldogs, redshirting his true freshman season starting his final two seasons at defensive back. As a senior, Brown made 42 tackles with eight passes defended, four interceptions and one sack and was named Second-team All-Mid-Eastern Athletic Conference. He finished his collegiate career with 90 tackles, 26 passes defensed, seven interceptions and one sack in 31 games played, starting 25.

== Professional career ==
Pre-draft measurables
Height	Weight	Arm length	Hand span	40-yard dash	10-yard split	20-yard split	20-yard shuttle	Three-cone drill	Vertical jump	Broad jump	Bench press
5 ft 9 5/8 in (1.77 m)	183 lb (83 kg)	33 in (0.84 m)	9 in (0.23 m)	4.44 s	1.51 s	2.57 s	4.33 s	7.20 s	41.5 in (1.05 m)	10 ft 11 in (3.33 m)	12 reps
All values from Pro Day

=== San Francisco 49ers ===
Brown was signed by the San Francisco 49ers as an undrafted free agent on May 15, 2019 after participating in a rookie minicamp. Brown was waived by the 49ers on July 25, 2019.

=== Philadelphia Eagles ===
Brown was claimed off waivers by the Philadelphia Eagles, but was waived by the team two weeks later on August 4, 2019.

=== New York Jets ===
The New York Jets claimed Brown off waivers on August 5, 2019. Despite a strong showing in the preseason, Brown was waived by the Jets during final roster cuts.

=== Kansas City Chiefs ===
Brown was signed to the Kansas City Chiefs practice squad on September 2, 2019. The Chiefs promoted Brown to the active roster on December 5, 2019. Brown made his NFL debut on December 8, 2019 against the New England Patriots. Brown played in three games with two tackles in the regular season and played in all three of the Chiefs playoff games on special teams, including the Chiefs' win in Super Bowl LIV against the 49ers.

On August 16, 2020, Brown was placed on injured reserve after suffering a torn anterior cruciate ligament (ACL) in practice.

=== Detroit Lions ===
On May 17, 2021, Brown signed with the Detroit Lions. He was waived on August 15, after a wrong way drunken crash on a freeway

=== Edmonton Elks ===
Brown was signed by the Edmonton Elks on November 30, 2022. He was released on May 10, 2023.

On September 18, 2024, Brown was suspended 3 games by the NFL.
