= Bugayev =

Bugayev (masculine, Russian: Бугаев) or Bugayeva (feminine, Russian: Бугаева), also transliterated as Bugaev, is a Russian surname. Notable people with the surname include:

- Aleksei Bugayev (1981–2024), Russian footballer
- Boris Bugayev (1923–2007), Soviet aviator and politician
- Igor Bugayev (1933–2021), Soviet-Russian politician
- Nikolai Bugaev (1837–1903), Russian mathematician
- Nikolai Bugaev (Soviet scientist) (1923–2003), Soviet scientist
- Roman Bugayev (born 1989), Russian footballer

== See also ==
- Andrei Bely, pseudonym of Boris Nikolaevich Bugaev, Russian novelist, poet, theorist, and literary critic
- Bogayev
