= 2019–20 Washington Huskies men's basketball team =

American college basketball season

2019–20 Washington Huskies men's basketball
- Conference: Pac-12 Conference
- Record: 15–17 (5–13 Pac-12)
- Head coach: Mike Hopkins (3rd season)
- Assistant coaches: Will Conroy (5th season); Cameron Dollar (3rd season); Dave Rice (3rd season)
- Home arena: Alaska Airlines Arena

2019–20 Pac-12 Conference men's basketball standings
	Conf.				Overall
Team	W		L	PCT	W		L	PCT
No. 13 Oregon	13	–	5	.722	24	–	7	.774
UCLA	12	–	6	.667	19	–	12	.613
USC	11	–	7	.611	22	–	9	.710
Arizona State	11	–	7	.611	20	–	11	.645
Arizona	10	–	8	.556	21	–	11	.656
Colorado	10	–	8	.556	21	–	11	.656
Stanford	9	–	9	.500	20	–	12	.625
Oregon State	7	–	11	.389	18	–	13	.581
Utah	7	–	11	.389	16	–	15	.516
California	7	–	11	.389	14	–	18	.438
Washington State	6	–	12	.333	16	–	16	.500
Washington	5	–	13	.278	15	–	17	.469
Note: The 2020 Pac-12 Tournament was canceled prior to the quarterfinals due to the COVID-19 pandemic. Rankings from AP poll

The 2019–20 Washington Huskies men's basketball team represented the University of Washington in the 2019–20 NCAA Division I men's basketball season. The Huskies, led by third-year head coach Mike Hopkins, played their home games at Alaska Airlines Arena at Hec Edmundson Pavilion in Seattle, Washington as members of the Pac-12 Conference. They finished the season 15–17, 5–13 in Pac-12 play to finish in last place. They lost in the first round of the Pac-12 tournament to Arizona.

== Previous season ==
The Huskies finished the 2018–19 season 27–9, 15–2 in Pac-12 play to finish in first place. Coach Hopkins received back-to-back Pac-12 Coach of the Year awards. Matisse Thybulle was named Pac-12 Defender of the Year. Jaylen Nowell was named Pac-12 Player of the Year. The Huskies lost to Oregon in the championship game of the Pac-12 tournament. They received an at-large invitation to the NCAA tournament as a nine seed in the Midwest Region, where they defeated eight seed and 25th ranked Utah State in the first round before losing to the first seed and third ranked North Carolina in the second round. On January 19, 2019 Washington became the first team in college basketball history to record 1000 wins in the same arena.

== Off-season ==
=== Departures ===
Name	Number	Pos.	Height	Weight	Year	Hometown	Reason for departure
David Crisp	1	G	6'0"	185	Senior	Tacoma, WA	Graduated
Matisse Thybulle	4	G	6'5"	205	Senior	Issaquah, WA	Graduated/2019 NBA draft
Jaylen Nowell	5	G	6'4"	200	Sophomore	Seattle, WA	2019 NBA draft
Noah Dickerson	15	F	6'8"	245	Senior	Atlanta, GA	Graduated
Dominic Green	22	F	6'6"	200	Senior	Renton, WA	Graduated

=== Incoming transfers ===
Name	Number	Pos.	Height	Weight	Year	Hometown	Previous school
Quade Green	55	G	6'0"	170	Sophomore	Philadelphia, Pennsylvania	Kentucky
J’Raan Brooks	35	F	6'9"	220	Sophomore	Seattle, Washington	USC

Quade Green transferred from Kentucky at the end of the fall quarter in 2018. He was scheduled to be eligible to play with the Huskies starting December 17, 2019 but after a petition to NCAA it was deemed that he was eligible to play for the full 2019–20 season.

=== 2019 recruiting class ===
College recruiting
Name	Hometown	School	Height	Weight	Commit date
RaeQuan Battle; SG	Marysville, WA	Marysville Pilchuck High School	6 ft 5 in (1.96 m)	200 lb (91 kg)	May 31, 2018
RaeQuan Battle; SG	Recruit ratings: Scout: Rivals: 247Sports: ESPN:				
Jaden McDaniels; PF	Federal Way, WA	Federal Way High School	6 ft 9 in (2.06 m)	185 lb (84 kg)	May 21, 2019
Jaden McDaniels; PF	Recruit ratings: Scout: Rivals: 247Sports: ESPN:				
Isaiah Stewart; C	Rochester, NY	La Lumiere School	6 ft 9 in (2.06 m)	245 lb (111 kg)	Jan 20, 2019
Isaiah Stewart; C	Recruit ratings: Scout: Rivals: 247Sports: ESPN:				
Marcus Tsohonis; SG	Portland, OR	Jefferson High School	6 ft 3 in (1.91 m)	170 lb (77 kg)	Sep 18, 2018
Marcus Tsohonis; SG	Recruit ratings: Rivals: 247Sports: ESPN:				
Overall recruit ranking:
Note: In many cases, Scout, Rivals, 247Sports, On3, and ESPN may conflict in their listings of height and weight.; In these cases, the average was taken. ESPN grades are on a 100-point scale.; Sources: "2019 Washington Commits". Rivals.; "ESPN- Washington Huskies Men's Basketball Recruiting". ESPN.; "2019 Team Ranking". Rivals.

== Roster ==
2019–20 Washington Huskies men's basketball team
Players
Coaches

Pos.	#	Name	Height	Weight	Year	Previous school	Hometown
F	0	Jaden McDaniels	6 ft 9 in (2.06 m)	200 lb (91 kg)	Fr	Federal Way HS	Federal Way, WA
F	1	Nate Roberts	6 ft 10 in (2.08 m)	245 lb (111 kg)	RS Fr	Brewster Academy	Washington, D.C.
F	5	Jamal Bey	6 ft 6 in (1.98 m)	210 lb (95 kg)	So	Bishop Gorman HS	Las Vegas, NV
G	10	Elijah Hardy	6 ft 2 in (1.88 m)	170 lb (77 kg)	So	Bishop O'Dowd HS	Oakland, CA
F	11	Nahziah Carter	6 ft 6 in (1.98 m)	205 lb (93 kg)	Jr	Bishop Kearney HS	Rochester, NY
G	12	Jason Crandall (W)	6 ft 0 in (1.83 m)	155 lb (70 kg)	RS Jr	Issaquah HS	Issaquah, WA
F	13	Hameir Wright	6 ft 9 in (2.06 m)	220 lb (100 kg)	Jr	Albany Academy	Albany, NY
F	14	Sam Timmins	6 ft 11 in (2.11 m)	265 lb (120 kg)	Sr	Otago Boys' High School	Dunedin, New Zealand
G	15	Marcus Tsohonis	6 ft 3 in (1.91 m)	185 lb (84 kg)	Fr	Jefferson HS	Portland, OR
G	20	Quin Barnard (W)	6 ft 0 in (1.83 m)	175 lb (79 kg)	RS Jr	O'Dea HS	Bellevue, WA
F	21	RaeQuan Battle	6 ft 5 in (1.96 m)	185 lb (84 kg)	Fr	Marysville Pilchuck HS	Marysville, WA
C	23	Bryan Penn-Johnson	7 ft 0 in (2.13 m)	245 lb (111 kg)	RS Fr	Wasatch Academy	Long Beach, CA
G	24	Jonah Geron (W)	6 ft 5 in (1.96 m)	175 lb (79 kg)	RS Fr	San Joaquin HS	San Joaquin, CA
G	30	Travis Rice (W)	6 ft 2 in (1.88 m)	185 lb (84 kg)	RS Jr	Northern Arizona	Las Vegas, NV
G	32	Noah Neubauer (W)	6 ft 3 in (1.91 m)	185 lb (84 kg)	RS Fr	Garfield HS	Seattle, WA
C	33	Isaiah Stewart	6 ft 9 in (2.06 m)	250 lb (113 kg)	Fr	La Lumiere School	Rochester, NY
F	34	Regan Lundeen (W)	6 ft 6 in (1.98 m)	230 lb (104 kg)	So	Mater Dei HS	Santa Ana, CA
F	35	J'Raan Brooks (redshirt)	6 ft 9 in (2.06 m)	220 lb (100 kg)	So	USC	Seattle, WA
C	52	Riley Sorn (W)	7 ft 4 in (2.24 m)	270 lb (122 kg)	RS Fr	Richland HS	Richland, WA
G	55	Quade Green (I)	6 ft 0 in (1.83 m)	170 lb (77 kg)	Jr	Kentucky	Philadelphia, PA

Head coach

- Mike Hopkins (Syracuse)

Assistant coach(es)

- Will Conroy (Washington)
- Cameron Dollar (UCLA)
- Dave Rice (UNLV)

Legend

- (C) Team captain
- (S) Suspended
- (I) Ineligible
- (W) Walk-on
- Injured
- Current redshirt

Roster
Last update: January 9, 2020

- Jan. 9, 2020 – Quade Green ruled academically ineligible for winter quarter.

=== Depth chart ===
Pos.	Starting 5	Bench 1	Bench 2
C	Isaiah Stewart	Sam Timmins	Bryan Penn-Johnson
PF	Hameir Wright	Nate Roberts
SF	Jaden McDaniels	Jamal Bey	RaeQuan Battle
SG	Nahziah Carter
PG	Elijah Hardy		Marcus Tsohonis

== Schedule and results ==
Date time, TV	Rank^{#}	Opponent^{#}	Result	Record	High points	High rebounds	High assists	Site (attendance) city, state
Exhibition
August 15, 2019*; 12:00 pm, FloHoops		Peak Warriors	W 94–35	–	18 – Carter	9 – Roberts	8 – Hardy	Centro Sportivo Tellene; Rome, Italy
August 16, 2019*; 11:00 am, FloHoops		Peak Warriors	W 91–46	–	24 – Stewart	16 – Stewart	–	Centro Sportivo Tellene; Rome, Italy
August 18, 2019*; 10:00 am, FloHoops		Pistoia	W 73–59	–	25 – Stewart	10 – Carter	5 – Hardy	Palazzetto Dello Sport Via Fermi; Pistoia, Italy
August 20, 2019*; 10:00 am, FloHoops		Siena All-Stars	W 97–39	–	20 – Carter	12 – Stewart	6 – Tsohonis	Palestra Viale Achille Sclavo; Siena, Italy
October 31, 2019*; 7:00 pm		Western Washington	W 87–63	–	20 – Bey	11 – Stewart	5 – Tied	Alaska Airlines Arena (8,008); Seattle, WA
Non-conference regular season
November 8, 2019*; 6:30 pm, ESPN		vs. No. 16 Baylor; Armed Forces Classic	W 67–64	1–0	23 – Carter	7 – Tied	9 – Green	Alaska Airlines Center (5,117); Anchorage, AK
November 12, 2019*; 6:00 pm, P12N	No. 20	Mount St. Mary's	W 56–46	2–0	16 – Stewart	9 – McDaniels	4 – Tied	Alaska Airlines Arena (7,480); Seattle, WA
November 16, 2019*; 2:00 pm, ESPN+	No. 20	vs. Tennessee; Naismith Hall of Fame Classic	L 62–75	2–1	18 – Carter	12 – Carter	6 – Green	Scotiabank Arena (6,802); Toronto, ON
November 19, 2019*; 8:00 pm, P12N	No. 25	Maine	W 72–53	3–1	16 – Stewart	9 – Stewart	4 – McDaniels	Alaska Airlines Arena (8,072); Seattle, WA
November 22, 2019*; 8:00 pm, P12N	No. 25	Montana	W 73–56	4–1	18 – Stewart	8 – Wright	3 – Tied	Alaska Airlines Arena (8,370); Seattle, WA
November 24, 2019*; 7:30 pm, P12N	No. 25	San Diego	W 88–69	5–1	25 – Stewart	7 – Tied	10 – Green	Alaska Airlines Arena (8,537); Seattle, WA
December 2, 2019*; 7:30 pm, P12N	No. 22	South Dakota	W 75–55	6–1	20 – McDaniels	15 – Stewart	3 – Tied	Alaska Airlines Arena (7,178); Seattle, WA
December 4, 2019*; 7:00 pm, P12N	No. 22	Eastern Washington	W 90–80	7–1	20 – Green	6 – Tied	8 – Green	Alaska Airlines Arena (7,419); Seattle, WA
December 8, 2019*; 4:00 pm, ESPN2	No. 22	No. 9 Gonzaga; Rivalry	L 76–83	7–2	21 – Stewart	10 – Stewart	8 – Green	Alaska Airlines Arena (9,268); Seattle, WA
December 17, 2019*; 8:00 pm, P12N	No. 22	Seattle	W 81–59	8–2	27 – Stewart	13 – Stewart	4 – Tied	Alaska Airlines Arena (7,760); Seattle, WA
December 22, 2019*; 6:30 pm, ESPN2	No. 22	vs. Ball State; Diamond Head Classic quarterfinal	W 85–64	9–2	22 – McDaniels	10 – Stewart	6 – Green	Stan Sheriff Center; Honolulu, HI
December 23, 2019*; 8:00 pm, ESPN2	No. 21	vs. Hawaiʻi; Diamond Head Classic semifinal	W 72–61	10–2	26 – Stewart	13 – Tied	7 – Green	Stan Sheriff Center; Honolulu, HI
December 25, 2019*; 5:30 pm, ESPN2	No. 21	vs. Houston; Diamond Head Classic championship	L 71–75	10–3	25 – Stewart	8 – Stewart	7 – Green	Stan Sheriff Center (6,356); Honolulu, HI
Pac-12 regular season
January 2, 2020; 7:00 pm, FS1		UCLA	L 64–66	10–4 (0–1)	24 – Stewart	11 – Stewart	4 – Green	Alaska Airlines Arena (9,027); Seattle, WA
January 5, 2020; 7:00 pm, FS1		USC	W 72–40	11–4 (1–1)	18 – Stewart	10 – Stewart	5 – Green	Alaska Airlines Arena (8,774); Seattle, WA
January 9, 2020; 6:00 pm, FS1		at Stanford	L 55–61	11–5 (1–2)	18 – McDaniels	15 – McDaniels	3 – Hardy	Maples Pavilion (5,328); Stanford, CA
January 11, 2020; 5:00 pm, P12N		at California	L 58–61 ^{OT}	11–6 (1–3)	13 – Stewart	11 – McDaniels	3 – Wright	Haas Pavilion (4,660); Berkeley, CA
January 16, 2020; 8:00 pm, FS1		Oregon State	W 64–56	12–6 (2–3)	13 – Stewart	7 – Carter	3 – Tied	Alaska Airlines Arena (8,207); Seattle, WA
January 18, 2020; 12:45 pm, CBS		No. 8 Oregon	L 61–64 ^{OT}	12–7 (2–4)	25 – Stewart	19 – Stewart	2 – Tied	Alaska Airlines Arena (9,268); Seattle, WA
January 23, 2020; 5:00 pm, P12N		at Utah	L 66–67	12–8 (2–5)	14 – McDaniels	9 – Wright	4 – Wright	Jon M. Huntsman Center (9,396); Salt Lake City, UT
January 25, 2020; 6:00 pm, FS1		at No. 23 Colorado	L 62–76	12–9 (2–6)	23 – Stewart	8 – Stewart	5 – Wright	CU Events Center (9,521); Boulder, CO
January 30, 2020; 6:00 pm, ESPN2		Arizona	L 72–75	12–10 (2–7)	14 – Battle	11 – Stewart	5 – McDaniels	Alaska Airlines Arena (9,123); Seattle, WA
February 1, 2020; 7:30 pm, P12N		Arizona State	L 83–87	12–11 (2–8)	19 – Tsohonis	6 – Carter	3 – Bey	Alaska Airlines Arena (9,066); Seattle, WA
February 9, 2020; 3:00 pm, ESPNU		at Washington State; Rivalry	L 67–79	12–12 (2–9)	18 – Carter	7 – Stewart	3 – McDaniels	Beasley Coliseum (4,866); Pullman, WA
February 13, 2020; 6:00 pm, ESPN2		at USC	L 56–62	12–13 (2–10)	19 – McDaniels	12 – McDaniels	6 – Carter	Galen Center (4,765); Los Angeles, CA
February 15, 2020; 7:00 pm, ESPN2		at UCLA	L 57–67	12–14 (2–11)	15 – Tied	10 – Stewart	3 – Tsohonis	Pauley Pavilion (8,014); Los Angeles, CA
February 20, 2020; 7:00 pm, P12N		Stanford	L 64–72	12–15 (2–12)	14 – Stewart	9 – Carter	3 – Stewart	Alaska Airlines Arena (8,622); Seattle, WA
February 22, 2020; 3:00 pm, P12N		California	W 87–52	13–15 (3–12)	16 – Carter	7 – McDaniels	5 – McDaniels	Alaska Airlines Arena (8,873); Seattle, WA
February 28, 2020; 6:00 pm, FS1		Washington State; Rivalry	L 74–78	13–16 (3–13)	19 – McDaniels	11 – Stewart	2 – Tsohonis	Alaska Airlines Arena (9,131); Seattle, WA
March 5, 2020; 6:00 pm, ESPN2		at Arizona State	W 90–83	14–16 (4–13)	23 – Carter	12 – Stewart	5 – Hardy	Desert Financial Arena (9,829); Tempe, AZ
March 7, 2020; 7:00 pm, ESPN		at Arizona	W 69–63	15–16 (5–13)	20 – McDaniels	7 – Stewart	5 – Tsohonis	McKale Center (13,604); Tucson, AZ
Pac-12 Tournament
March 11, 2020; 2:30 pm, P12N	(12)	vs. (5) Arizona; First round	L 70–77	15–17	29 – Stewart	12 – Stewart	3 – Tied	T-Mobile Arena (8,048); Paradise, NV
*Non-conference game. ^{#}Rankings from AP Poll. (#) Tournament seedings in parentheses. All times are in Pacific Time.

== Rankings ==
Ranking movements Legend: ██ Increase in ranking ██ Decrease in ranking — = Not ranked RV = Received votes
	Week																				
Poll	Pre	1	2	3	4	5	6	7	8	9	10	11	12	13	14	15	16	17	18	19	Final
AP	RV	20	25	23	22	RV	22	21	RV	RV	RV	—	—	—	—	—	—	—	—	—	Not released
Coaches	RV	RV^	24	22	23	25	22	20	RV	RV	—	—	—	—	—	—	—	—	—	—	

*AP does not release post-NCAA Tournament rankings.
^Coaches did not release a Week 2 poll.

== Awards and honors ==
=== Freshman of the Week ===
Week	Player	Opponents
12/9	Isaiah Stewart	Eastern Washington & Gonzaga
12/23	Isaiah Stewart	Seattle & Ball State
12/30	Isaiah Stewart	Hawaiʻi & Houston
1/6	Isaiah Stewart	UCLA & USC
3/9	Jaden McDaniels	ASU & Arizona

=== All Pac-12 Team ===
- First team: Isaiah Stewart

=== Pac-12 All-Freshman Team ===
- Isaiah Stewart
