= John Moe =

American writer and radio personality (born 1968)

John Moe (born 1968) is an American writer and radio personality. He is the author of several books and host of the Depresh Mode and Sleeping with Celebrities podcasts. Originally an actor and playwright, he was a senior editor at Amazon.com, starting their electronic greeting card service and editing their toys site. He worked as a host, producer, and announcer at KUOW, Seattle's NPR station, and then at American Public Media hosting national radio programs and podcasts from 2007 until 2020. Since that time, he has been an independent podcast host and producer, working with the Maximum Fun network.

== Early life ==
The youngest of four children of Erling Moe, a freight dispatcher, and Aase Moe, a registered nurse, John Moe grew up in Federal Way, Washington and graduated from Federal Way High School. He graduated from Whitman College with a degree in Dramatic Arts in 1990. He was elected by his class to speak at their graduation. While in college, Moe hosted radio shows, wrote a humor column for the student newspaper, acted in several plays, and won the school's first annual one-act play writing contest.

== Career ==
After his education was completed, Moe was a traveling actor and director with Missoula Children's Theatre before moving to Seattle. There he acted in several fringe theater productions in the nineties and served as an understudy in productions at Seattle Repertory Theater. Eventually, his interest turned to writing and he wrote plays that were performed around Seattle. His musical, The Big Time, co-written with Chris Ballew of The Presidents of the United States of America, was performed at the Edinburgh Festival Fringe. In 1998, he was hired as a Senior Editor at Amazon.com.

Moe was hired at KUOW, Seattle's NPR station, in 2001 as a staff writer for Rewind, a national news and satire show hosted by Weekend America's Bill Radke. Moe was the host and producer of The Works, a weekly interview program which focused on business and technology. Moe also hosted The Power of Voice, a weekly listener call-in show on local and national issues. He had been working for two and a half years as a host and producer when he became the senior staff reporter and permanent fill-in host with Weekend America.

On August 16, 2008, he became host of the program, replacing Bill Radke and Desiree Cooper, who became a senior correspondent for Weekend America. Moe developed and wrote the weekly segment "A Little Bit of Weather Everywhere", presenting unique events happening around the country, and the weather for the day at these events.

After the cancellation of Weekend America, Moe became the host of American Public Media's Future Tense on May 3, 2010. On Monday, September 20, 2010, Future Tense changed its name to Marketplace Tech Report as it became part of the Marketplace portfolio of programs. On September 10, 2012, Moe left Marketplace Tech Report to devote his full-time attention to hosting the radio variety show Wits. Wits was a stage and radio show performed in the Fitzgerald Theater. It began in 2010, and a podcast was created in 2012. The show consists of interviews, comedic sketches, musical performances, and a game show between the two guests, who have included George Takei, Maria Bamford, David Cross, and Neil Gaiman.

When Wits ended, Moe turned his attention to creating and hosting podcasts.

=== Writing ===
Moe is the author of The Hilarious World of Depression, published in 2020, a memoir of his experiences with major depressive disorder. The book chronicles the development of the illness, the suicide of Moe’s brother Rick, and the development of the podcast of the same name.

Moe is the author of Dear Luke, We Need To Talk, Darth: and Other Pop Culture Correspondences, published in June 2014. The book is a compilation of fictitious letters, notes, and messages based around familiar songs, movies, TV shows, and sporting events. He is also the author of Conservatize Me: How I Tried to Become a Righty with the Help of Richard Nixon, Sean Hannity, Toby Keith, and Beef Jerky, published in October 2006. The book chronicles Moe's attempt to become a conservative. The book contains several encounters with political experts, historians, and enthusiasts of all affiliations.

His work has appeared in the McSweeney's anthologies Created in Darkness by Troubled Americans, The McSweeney's Joke Book of Book Jokes, and Mountain Man Dance Moves. He has also written for The New York Times Magazine, Reader's Digest, AARP, The Seattle Times, The Minneapolis Star Tribune, and the Seattle Weekly.

He is also the author of Pop Song Correspondences, a feature on the McSweeney's website, which also became a recurring segment on the Wits radio show. Moe has performed selections from Pop Song Correspondences at Seattle's Bumbershoot festival.

=== Podcasts ===
In June 2015, Moe along with rapper Open Mike Eagle launched Conversation Parade, a podcast in which the two discuss the Cartoon Network animated series Adventure Time. The podcast has featured guests like Jeremy Shada (the voice of Finn the Human), John DiMaggio (the voice of Jake the Dog), Hynden Walch (the voice of Princess Bubblegum), Adam Muto (the series' co-executive producer and showrunner), Kent Osborne (Adventure Time's head writer), Niki Yang (the voice of BMO and Lady Rainicorn), Olivia Olson (the voice of Marceline), Jesse Moynihan (former storyboard artist), Jessica DiCicco (the voice of Flame Princess), Elizabeth Ito (one of the show's supervising directors), and alternative country musician Neko Case.

In 2016, Dr. Craig Bowron MD FACP, contributor at Huffington Post, wrote an article announcing and recommending a new podcast by John Moe, The Hilarious World of Depression. The Hilarious World of Depression won the Webby Award for Best Comedy Podcast in 2017 and led to Moe's book of the same name. The show ended in June 2020 as Moe was laid off from American Public Media amid the growing pandemic.

Moe began the Depresh Mode podcast in March 2021 as part of the Maximum Fun network. It follows a similar format to the previous show and again focuses on long-form interviews, often with creative artists and public figures telling stories of their own mental health struggles. Guests have included Jamie Lee Curtis, David Sedaris, and Surgeon General Vivek Murthy. The show's episode with actor Joel Kim Booster talking about his active depression led to an LA Press Club award.

Moe created Sleeping with Celebrities, a comedy and sleep aid podcast, in February 2023.

Moe created but did not host the podcast You Are Not Alone: Voices of Recovery for the National Alliance on Mental Illness and won multiple awards for Our Whitman, My Story, a promotional podcast for Whitman College.

== Personal life ==
Moe lives in St. Paul, Minnesota. His wife, Jill Moe, is a well-known crop artist and crop art instructor. Moe is also the lead singer for the band Math Emergency, which he has written about for AARP.

== Works ==
=== Radio shows developed ===
- The Works
- Wits
- Marketplace Tech
- "A Little Bit of Weather Everywhere", weekly segment on Weekend America
- "Pop Song Correspondences", segment on Wits

=== Podcasts developed ===
- Conversation Parade
- The Hilarious World of Depression
- Depresh Mode
- Sleeping with Celebrities
- Our Whitman, My Story
- You Are Not Alone: Voices of Recovery

=== Radio shows hosted ===
- The Works
- Weekend America
- Future Tense/Marketplace Tech
- Wits

=== Books ===
- Conservatize Me: How I Tried to Become a Righty with the Help of Richard Nixon, Sean Hannity, Toby Keith, and Beef Jerky (2006)
- Dear Luke, We Need To Talk, Darth: and Other Pop Culture Correspondences (2014)
- The Deleted E-Mails of Hillary Clinton: A Parody (2015)
- The Hilarious World of Depression (2020)
