= Bogayev =

Bogayev or Bogaev (Russian: Богаев; feminine Bogayeva or Bogaeva) is a surname of Russian origin. Notable people with the surname include:

- Barbara Bogaev, American radio journalist
- Dmitry Bogayev (born 1994), Russian footballer
- Oleg Bogayev (born 1970), Russian playwright

== See also ==
- Bugayev
