= Barbara Bogaev =

American radio journalist

Barbara Bogaev is an American radio journalist noted for her work as the host of the public radio documentary program Soundprint and guest host of WHYY's Fresh Air.

== Early life ==
Bogaev grew up in Philadelphia. She graduated cum laude with a degree in comparative literature from Silliman College, Yale University in 1983.

== Career ==
Before becoming a radio journalist, Bogaev worked in television including at PBS affiliates, CBS, and Nickelodeon.

She was co-host of the former American Public Media program, Weekend America, from 2004 through 2006. On December 5, 2006, a memo was circulated at Weekend America announcing that Bogaev would be leaving the show. On December 9, 2006, the show's co-host, Bill Radke, announced Bogaev's departure with no specifics given regarding her or the program. Weekend America last aired on January 31, 2009.

Bogaev was substitute host of the National Public Radio program, Fresh Air with Terry Gross. During her tenure at the show, Bogaev interviewed figures including Fred Rogers, Mary Karr, Peter Jackson, and Bill Nye.

She was a guest host of Marketplace Weekend, from American Public Media from 2013 to 2014.

She is one of the hosts of the Shakespeare Unlimited podcast series, produced by the Folger Shakespeare Library.

Bogaev guest hosts the news and culture magazine shows "To The Point" and "Press Play" on KCRW, Santa Monica.

== SOUNDPRINT ==
Peabody-Award-winning SOUNDPRINT Media Center, Inc. published stories from January 1988 to July 2012, from Laurel, Maryland.

SOUNDPRINT, founded at WJHU, first broadcast in January, 1988, with Bill Siemering as executive producer, funded by the Corporation for Public Broadcasting, National Endowment for the Arts, and the American Radio Program Fund

As a host of SOUNDPRINT, Bogaev hosted more than 250 episodes and produced 7 documentaries.

Moira Rankin was president of Soundprint Media Center, an independent nonprofit carried on NPR's satellite radio channel.
