= Weekend America =

Radio program

- Running time: ca. 120 min.
- Country of origin: United States
- Language(s): English
- Syndicates: APM, NPR
- Hosted by: John Moe; Desiree Cooper
- Written by: Ben Adair (managing editor)
- Directed by: Rob Byers
- Produced by: Michael Raphael
- Executive producer(s): Peter Clowney
- Recording studio: St Paul, Minnesota
- Original release: May 1, 2004 – January 31, 2009
- Audio format: Stereophonic
- Opening theme: "Crazyhorse Mongoose" by Galactic
- Website: www.weekendamerica.org

Weekend America was a weekly public radio program dealing with news, popular culture, the arts and more. The program was produced for American Public Media and hosted by John Moe in Saint Paul, Minnesota.

Weekend America launched Saturday, May 1, 2004, as a pilot aired by the show's developmental stations, then known as Public Radio Weekend. The show went national under the Weekend America branding Saturday, October 9, 2004.

Public radio veterans Bill Radke and Barbara Bogaev, based in Los Angeles, served as hosts during the pilot stage and early national phase. Bogaev left the program on December 9, 2006. Detroit native Desiree Cooper was selected to replace Bogaev, beginning in August 2007. Cooper's arrival signaled a shift in the program's production, with Radke's segments originating in L.A., and Cooper's from St. Paul, Minnesota.

As part of a consolidation move in the summer of 2008, American Public Media moved production on Weekend America from Los Angeles to St. Paul. The changes shook up the cast. Cooper was bumped to "Senior Correspondent" and returned to Detroit. Radke left the program altogether. Commentator and occasional substitute host John Moe was promoted to sole host, based in St. Paul.

The show was divided into two hours, which were further subdivided into five segments per hour. Weekend America was designed to be run untouched; with local cutaways at predetermined points; with long local segments in place of one of the five national segments; or as one or two national segments spliced into a locally produced show. Many public radio stations aired the show untouched.

Regular segments of the show included "Good News, Bad News, or No News", where three panelists evaluated the significance of a recent news item; "A Little Bit of Weather Everywhere", which featured unique events happening around the country and the weather for the day at these events; and "Weekend Soundtrack", where callers shared a favorite song that provides a backdrop to their weekends.

The theme music was "Crazyhorse Mongoose" by Galactic.

== Cancellation ==
American Public Media announced on December 19, 2008 the cancellation of the show due to financial pressures. The last program aired January 31, 2009.
