= 2019–20 Georgia Tech Yellow Jackets men's basketball team =

American college basketball season

2019–20 Georgia Tech Yellow Jackets men's basketball
- Conference: Atlantic Coast Conference
- Record: 17–14 (11–9 ACC)
- Head coach: Josh Pastner (4th season)
- Assistant coaches: Eric Reveno; Julian Swartz; Anthony Wilkins
- Home arena: McCamish Pavilion

2019–20 ACC men's basketball standings
	Conf.				Overall
Team	W		L	PCT	W		L	PCT
No. 4 Florida State	16	–	4	.800	26	–	5	.839
No. 16 Virginia	15	–	5	.750	23	–	7	.767
No. 14 Louisville	15	–	5	.750	24	–	7	.774
No. 11 Duke	15	–	5	.750	25	–	6	.806
Georgia Tech*	11	–	9	.550	17	–	14	.548
NC State	10	–	10	.500	20	–	12	.625
Syracuse	10	–	10	.500	18	–	14	.563
Notre Dame	10	–	10	.500	20	–	12	.625
Clemson	9	–	11	.450	16	–	15	.516
Miami (FL)	7	–	13	.350	15	–	16	.484
Boston College	7	–	13	.350	13	–	18	.419
Virginia Tech	7	–	13	.350	16	–	16	.500
Wake Forest	6	–	14	.300	13	–	18	.419
Pittsburgh	6	–	14	.300	16	–	17	.485
North Carolina	6	–	14	.300	14	–	19	.424
*Ineligible for postseason due to NCAA violations. Note: The 2020 ACC tournament was cancelled before the quarterfinals due to the COVID-19 pandemic. Rankings from AP poll

The 2019–20 Georgia Tech Yellow Jackets men's basketball team represented the Georgia Institute of Technology during the 2019–20 NCAA Division I men's basketball season. They are led by fourth-year head coach Josh Pastner and play their home games at Hank McCamish Pavilion as members of the Atlantic Coast Conference.

The Yellow Jackets finished the season 17–14 and 11–9 in ACC play. The team was banned from postseason play, including the conference tournament, due to NCAA rules violations.

== Previous season ==
The Yellow Jackets finished the 2018–19 season 14–18, 6–12 in ACC play to finish in tenth place. They lost in the first round of the ACC tournament to Notre Dame. They did not receive an invitation to a post-season tournament.

== Departures ==
Name	Number	Pos.	Height	Weight	Year	Hometown	Reason for departure
Brandon Alston	4	G	6'5"	200	(redshirt) Senior	Vienna, VA	Graduated
Evan Jester	11	F	6'6"	191	Sophomore	Riverdale, GA	None listed
Curtis Haywood	13	G	6'5"	202	Sophomore	Oklahoma City, OK	Transferred to Tulsa
Sylvester Ogbonda	24	F	6'10"	237	(redshirt) Junior	Fort Washington, MD	Graduated/Transferred to Ohio
Avi Schafer	32	C	6'8"	235	(redshirt) Sophomore	Osaka, Japan	Left to play professionally in Japan
Abdoulaye Gueye	34	F	6'9"	217	(redshirt) Senior	Dakar, Senegal	Graduated

=== Incoming transfers ===
Name	Number	Pos.	Height	Weight	Year	Hometown	Previous School
Bubba Parham	11	G	5'10"	160	Junior	Snellville, GA	VMI

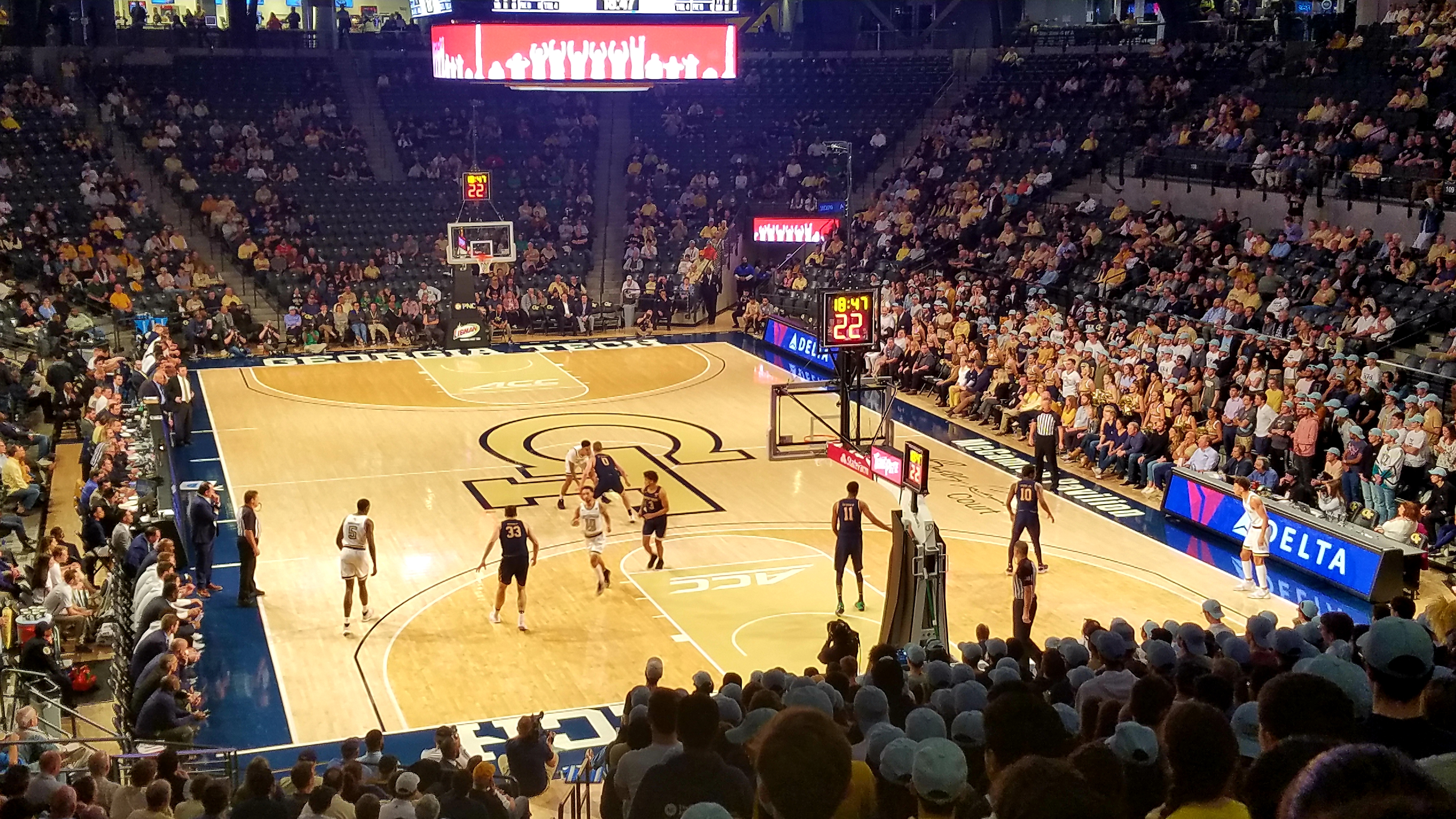
Georgia Tech vs. Notre Dame, January 15, 2020

== 2019 recruiting class ==
College recruiting information
Name	Hometown	School	Height	Weight	Commit date
Asanti Price; SG	Columbia, SC	Keenan	6 ft 5 in (1.96 m)	175 lb (79 kg)	Apr 3, 2019
Asanti Price; SG	Recruit ratings: Scout: Rivals: 247Sports: ESPN:				
David Didenko; PF	Boca Raton, FL	Palm Beach	6 ft 9 in (2.06 m)	230 lb (100 kg)	Oct 21, 2018
David Didenko; PF	Recruit ratings: Scout: Rivals: 247Sports: ESPN:				
Overall recruit ranking:
Note: In many cases, Scout, Rivals, 247Sports, On3, and ESPN may conflict in their listings of height and weight.; In these cases, the average was taken. ESPN grades are on a 100-point scale.; Sources: "2019 Georgia Tech Commits". Rivals.; "Georgia Tech 2019 Basketball Commits". Scout.; "Georgia Tech Yellow Jackets". ESPN.; "Scout.com Team Recruiting Rankings". Scout.; "2019 Team Ranking". Rivals.

== Roster ==
2019–20 Georgia Tech Yellow Jackets men's basketball team
Players
Coaches

Pos.	#	Name	Height	Weight	Year	Previous school	Hometown
G	0	Michael Devoe	6 ft 5 in (1.96 m)	193 lb (88 kg)	So	Montverde Academy	Orlando, FL
F/C	1	James Banks III	6 ft 10 in (2.08 m)	250 lb (113 kg)	Sr	La Lumiere HS; Texas	Decatur, GA
G	2	Shembari Phillips	6 ft 4 in (1.93 m)	210 lb (95 kg)	RS Sr	Wheeler HS/Tucker HS; Tennessee	Atlanta, GA
F	3	Evan Cole	6 ft 10 in (2.08 m)	226 lb (103 kg)	So	South Forsyth HS	Cumming, GA
G/F	4	Jordan Usher	6 ft 7 in (2.01 m)	220 lb (100 kg)	Jr	Wheeler HS; Southern California	Canton, GA
F	5	Moses Wright	6 ft 9 in (2.06 m)	220 lb (100 kg)	Jr	William G. Enloe HS	Raleigh, NC
G	10	Jose Alvarado	6 ft 0 in (1.83 m)	179 lb (81 kg)	Jr	Christ the King HS	Brooklyn, NY
G	11	Bubba Parham	5 ft 10 in (1.78 m)	160 lb (73 kg)	Jr	Brookwood HS; VMI	Snellville, GA
F	12	Khalid Moore	6 ft 7 in (2.01 m)	203 lb (92 kg)	So	Archbishop Molloy HS	Briarwood, NY
G	13	Coleman Boyd	6 ft 1 in (1.85 m)	173 lb (78 kg)	Fr	Mount Bethel Christian Academy	Smyrna, GA
F	14	David Didenko	6 ft 9 in (2.06 m)	232 lb (105 kg)	So	Palm Beach State College	Yakutsk, Russia
G	23	Asanti Price	6 ft 5 in (1.96 m)	177 lb (80 kg)	Fr	WJ Keenan HS	Columbia, SC
F	24	Jehloni James	6 ft 6 in (1.98 m)	180 lb (82 kg)	Fr	Lanier HS	Sugar Hill, GA
G	34	Niko Broadway	6 ft 3 in (1.91 m)	195 lb (88 kg)	Fr	St. Pius X HS	Atlanta, GA
F	35	Kristian Sjolund	6 ft 8 in (2.03 m)	213 lb (97 kg)	So	Obra D. Tompkins HS	Katy, TX
G	45	Shaheed Medlock	6 ft 5 in (1.96 m)	196 lb (89 kg)	Sr	Ware County HS	Waycross, GA
G	55	Malachi Rice (W)	6 ft 0 in (1.83 m)	186 lb (84 kg)	Jr	Brebeuf Jesuit Prep	Indianapolis, IN

Head coach

- Josh Pastner (Arizona)

Assistant coach(es)

- Eric Reveno (Stanford)
- Julian Swartz (Carroll)
- Anthony Wilkins (Kent State)

Legend

- (C) Team captain
- (S) Suspended
- (I) Ineligible
- (W) Walk-on
- Injured
- Current redshirt

Roster
Last update: October 31, 2019

== Schedule and results ==
Date time, TV	Rank^{#}	Opponent^{#}	Result	Record	High points	High rebounds	High assists	Site (attendance) city, state
Exhibition
October 20, 2019*; 2:00 pm, ACCNX		Georgia College	W 98–76	0–0	15 – Parham	11 – Cole	4 – Tied	McCamish Pavilion (1,984); Atlanta, GA
October 27, 2019*; 5:00 pm		at Alabama	L 65–93	0–0	18 – Cole	8 – Banks III	3 – Parham	Coleman Coliseum (9,293); Tuscaloosa, AL
Regular season
November 5, 2019; 8:30 pm, ACCN		at NC State	W 82–81 ^{OT}	1–0 (1–0)	22 – Devoe	14 – Banks III	6 – Alvarado	PNC Arena (17,133); Raleigh, NC
November 11, 2019*; 7:30 pm, ACCNX		Elon	W 64–41	2–0	22 – Devoe	10 – Price	5 – Moore	McCamish Pavilion (4,624); Atlanta, GA
November 20, 2019*; 7:00 pm, SECN+		at Georgia rivalry	L 78–82	2–1	34 – Devoe	10 – Devoe	2 – Tied	Stegeman Coliseum (10,205); Athens, GA
November 25, 2019*; 7:00 pm, ACCN		Arkansas	L 61–62 ^{OT}	2–2	20 – Banks III	13 – Banks III	2 – Tied	McCamish Pavilion (6,547); Atlanta, GA
December 1, 2019*; 6:00 pm, ACCRSN		Bethune–Cookman	W 68–65	3–2	27 – Devoe	12 – Wright	3 – Banks III	McCamish Pavilion (4,552); Atlanta, GA
December 4, 2019*; 7:15 pm, ESPNU		Nebraska; ACC–Big Ten Challenge	W 73–56	4–2	26 – Devoe	9 – Wright	7 – Devoe	McCamish Pavilion (5,133); Atlanta, GA
December 7, 2019; 12:00 pm, ACCN		Syracuse	L 63–97	4–3 (1–1)	17 – Wright	9 – Wright	6 – Tied	McCamish Pavilion (5,743); Atlanta, GA
December 14, 2019*; 5:00 pm, ESPN		at No. 8 Kentucky	L 53–67	4–4	13 – Wright	10 – Wright	4 – Devoe	Rupp Arena (20,111); Lexington, KY
December 18, 2019*; 7:00 pm, ACCRSN		Ball State; Diamond Head Classic non bracket game	L 47–65	4–5	13 – Banks III	9 – Banks III	3 – Parham	McCamish Pavilion (4,203); Atlanta, GA
December 22, 2019*; 5:00 pm, ESPNU		vs. Boise State; Diamond Head Classic Quarterfinals	W 74–60	5–5	18 – Tied	9 – Tied	2 – Usher	Stan Sheriff Center; Honolulu, HI
December 23, 2019*; 7:00 pm, ESPN2		vs. Houston; Diamond Head Classic Semifinals	L 59–70	5–6	19 – Wright	10 – Wright	4 – Alvarado	Stan Sheriff Center (5,585); Honolulu, HI
December 25, 2019*; 6:30 pm, ESPN2		at Hawaii; Diamond Head Classic 3rd place game	W 70–53	6–6	18 – Devoe	6 – Tied	4 – Tied	Stan Sheriff Center; Honolulu, HI
December 31, 2019; 12:00 pm, ESPNU		at No. 18 Florida State	L 58–70	6–7 (1–2)	19 – Devoe	10 – Wright	5 – Alvarado	Donald L. Tucker Center (6,837); Tallahassee, FL
January 4, 2020; 6:00 pm, ACCN		at North Carolina	W 96-83	7–7 (2–2)	25 – Alvarado	7 – Tied	8 – Alvarado	Dean Smith Center (21,099); Chapel Hill, NC
January 8, 2020; 9:00 pm, ACCN		No. 2 Duke	L 64–73	7–8 (2–3)	18 – Alvarado	15 – Banks III	5 – Alvarado	McCamish Pavilion (8,600); Atlanta, GA
January 11, 2020; 6:00 pm, ACCN		at Boston College	W 71–52	8–8 (3–3)	18 – Wright	10 – Wright	8 – Alvarado	Conte Forum (6,217); Chestnut Hill, MA
January 15, 2020; 8:30 pm, ACCN		Notre Dame	L 74–78	8–9 (3–4)	22 – Devoe	9 – Devoe	9 – Alvarado	McCamish Pavilion (5,899); Atlanta, GA
January 18, 2020; 8:00 pm, ACCN		Virginia	L 58–63	8–10 (3–5)	20 – Alvarado	9 – Banks III	5 – Banks III	McCamish Pavilion (7,314); Atlanta, GA
January 22, 2020; 7:00 pm, ACCRSN		at No. 6 Louisville	L 64–68	8–11 (3–6)	21 – Devoe	10 – Alvarado	3 – Tied	KFC Yum! Center (15,001); Louisville, KY
January 25, 2020; 4:00 pm, ACCRSN		NC State	W 64–58	9–11 (4–6)	26 – Alvarado	8 – Alvarado	6 – Usher	McCamish Pavilion (6,794); Atlanta, GA
January 28, 2020*; 7:30 pm, ACCNX		Morehouse	W 82–54	10–11	12 – Banks III	10 – Cole	6 – Usher	McCamish Pavilion (4,133); Atlanta, GA
February 1, 2020; 12:00 pm, ACCRSN		at Notre Dame	L 72–80	10–12 (4–7)	25 – Alvarado	10 – Banks III	4 – Wright	Edmund P. Joyce Center (8,240); Notre Dame, IN
February 4, 2020; 7:00 pm, ACCN		Virginia Tech	W 76–57	11–12 (5–7)	20 – Alvarado	7 – Tied	6 – Alvarado	McCamish Pavilion (4,727); Atlanta, GA
February 8, 2020; 2:00 pm, ACCRSN		at Pittsburgh	L 64–73	11–13 (5–8)	22 – Devoe	11 – Banks III	7 – Devoe	Petersen Events Center (10,754); Pittsburgh, PA
February 12, 2020; 8:00 pm, ACCN		No. 5 Louisville	W 64–58	12–13 (6–8)	18 – Alvarado	6 – Wright	5 – Devoe	McCamish Pavilion (5,801); Atlanta, GA
February 19, 2020; 7:00 pm, ACCRSN		at Wake Forest	W 86–79	13–13 (7–8)	24 – Devoe	7 – Tied	5 – Devoe	LJVM Coliseum (7,562); Winston-Salem, NC
February 22, 2020; 4:00 pm, ACCRSN		at Syracuse	L 72–79	13–14 (7–9)	33 – Wright	10 – Wright	6 – Alvarado	Carrier Dome (26,661); Syracuse, NY
February 25, 2020; 9:00 pm, ACCN		Clemson	W 68–59	14–14 (8–9)	19 – Alvarado	8 – Banks III	8 – Devoe	McCamish Pavilion (4,763); Atlanta, GA
February 29, 2020; 8:00 pm, ACCN		Miami (FL)	W 63–57	15–14 (9–9)	16 – Alvarado	14 – Banks III	2 – 4 tied	McCamish Pavilion (6,681); Atlanta, GA
March 4, 2020; 9:00 pm, ACCRSN		Pittsburgh	W 73–57	16–14 (10–9)	23 – Alvarado	9 – Tied	5 – Alvarado	McCamish Pavilion (4,764); Atlanta, GA
March 6, 2020; 7:00 pm, ESPN2		at Clemson	W 65–62	17–14 (11–9)	20 – Devoe	9 – Banks III	2 – Parham	Littlejohn Coliseum (8,188); Clemson, SC
*Non-conference game. ^{#}Rankings from AP Poll. (#) Tournament seedings in parentheses. All times are in Eastern Time.
