= Future Tense (American radio show) =

- Running time: 5 minutes
- Country of origin: United States
- Language(s): English
- Hosted by: John Moe
- Original release: 6 March 1996 – present
- Website: Future Tense homepage
- Podcast: Future Tense podcast XML

Future Tense was a short American radio program focusing on technology news. It was presented by John Moe and produced by Larissa Anderson for Minnesota Public Radio (MPR). The show was distributed by American Public Media and was hosted from 1996 to 2010 by Jon Gordon.

Today it is part of the Marketplace group within APM.

== History ==
In February 2010, MPR announced that Jon Gordon would take the role of social media/mobile editor at the network, and that John Moe would take over the show. Moe's first broadcast was 3 May 2010. In September 2010, it was announced that Future Tense would become Marketplace Tech Report.

== Broadcast ==
Future Tense airs weekdays and runs for approximately five minutes. The program first aired in March 1996. It has been podcast since 2004 and archives of the show are available online. It can be heard on Minnesota Public Radio stations at 8:20 AM, as well as part of U.S. broadcasts of the Canadian Broadcasting Corporation show As It Happens.
