= Jalen McDaniels =

American basketball player (born 1998)

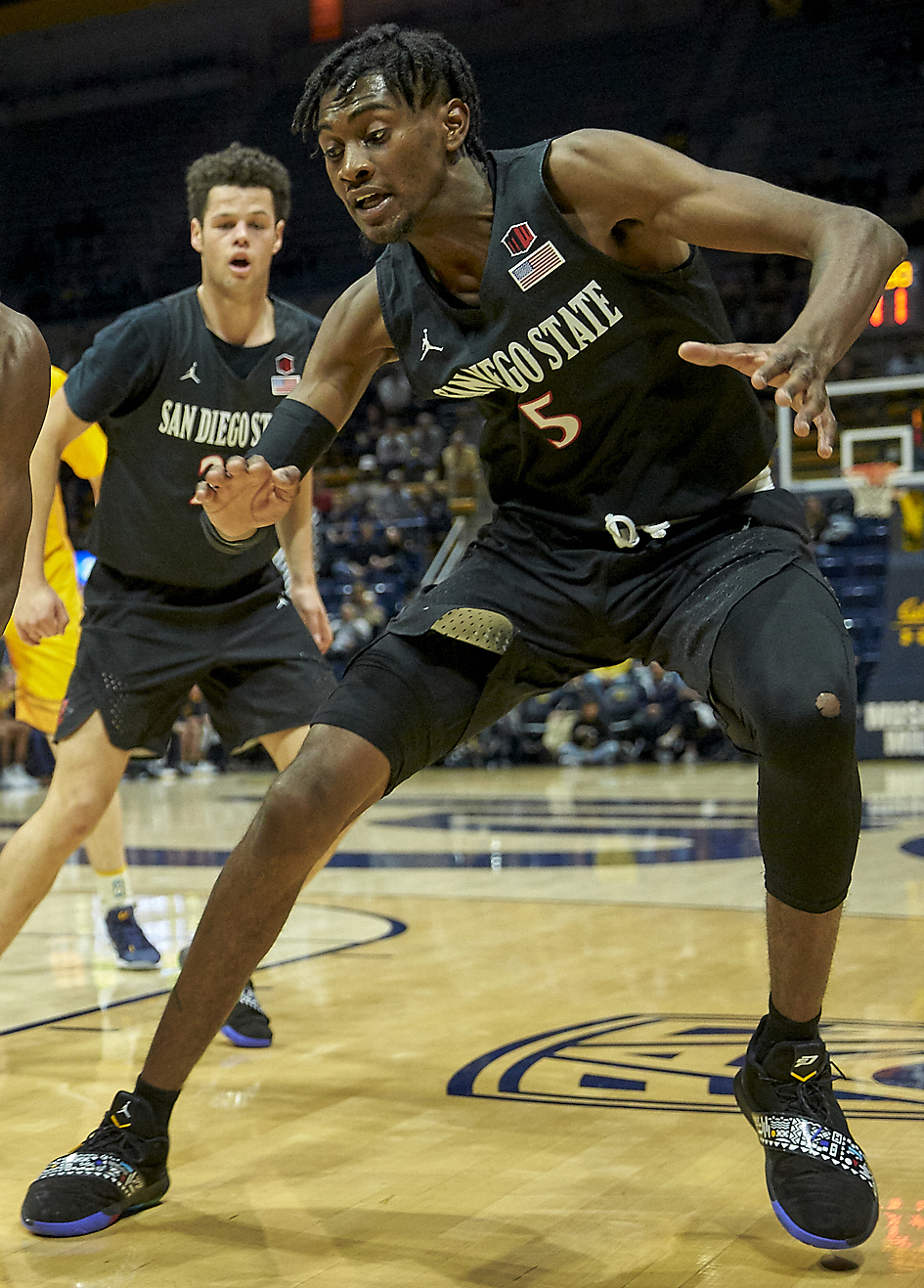
- McDaniels with San Diego State in 2018

Personal information
- Born: January 31, 1998 (age 28) Seattle, Washington, U.S
- Listed height: 6 ft 9 in (2.06 m)
- Listed weight: 190 lb (86 kg)

Career information
- High school: Federal Way (Federal Way, Washington)
- College: San Diego State (2017–2019)
- NBA draft: 2019: 2nd round, 52nd overall pick
- Drafted by: Charlotte Hornets
- Playing career: 2019–present
- Position: Small forward

Career history
- 2019–2023: Charlotte Hornets
- 2019–2021: →Greensboro Swarm
- 2023: Philadelphia 76ers
- 2023–2024: Toronto Raptors
- 2024–2025: Capital City Go-Go
- 2025: Washington Wizards
- 2026: Kobe Storks

Career highlights
- Second-team All-Mountain West (2019)
- Stats at NBA.com
- Stats at Basketball Reference

Jalen Marquis McDaniels (born January 31, 1998) is an American professional basketball player who recently played for the Kobe Storks of the Japanese B.League. He played college basketball for the San Diego State Aztecs. He is the older brother of basketball player Jaden McDaniels.

== High school career ==
Born in Seattle, Washington but a native of Federal Way, Washington, McDaniels attended Federal Way High School, where he also played football. McDaniels was the ranked as the 98th best prospect in the class of 2016 heading into his senior season at Federal Way High School. He was named an Associated Press Washington state Class 4A first-team selection after averaging 19 points, 10 rebounds and four blocked shots in his senior season. Federal Way finished the season undefeated with a record of 29-0 and won the Class 4A state championship.

College recruiting
Name	Hometown	School	Height	Weight	Commit date
Jalen McDaniels; PF	Federal Way, WA	Federal Way High School (WA)	6 ft 9 in (2.06 m)	195 lb (88 kg)	Sep 9, 2015
Jalen McDaniels; PF	Recruit ratings: Rivals: 247Sports: ESPN: (77)				
Overall recruit ranking: Rivals: 98 247Sports: 120
Note: In many cases, Scout, Rivals, 247Sports, On3, and ESPN may conflict in their listings of height and weight.; In these cases, the average was taken. ESPN grades are on a 100-point scale.; Sources: "2016 San Diego State Aztecs Recruiting Class". ESPN.; "2016 Team Ranking". Rivals.

== College career ==
McDaniels red-shirted the 2016–2017 season. On February 19, 2018, he was named the Mountain West player of the week. In his freshman season he averaged 10.5 points in 24.7 minutes per game, starting 21 out of 33 games. In March 2018, McDaniels submitted paperwork for early entry into the 2018 NBA draft but had yet to hire an agent. In May, he worked out for the Cleveland Cavaliers. On May 30, McDaniels officially withdrew his name from the NBA draft and returned to SDSU less than 90 minutes before the deadline.

As a sophomore, McDaniels averaged 15.9 points per game and led the team in rebounding with 8.3 rebounds per game. In March 2019, he declared for the 2019 NBA draft. McDaniels was one of 66 players invited to the NBA Draft Combine.

== Professional career ==
=== Charlotte Hornets (2019–2023) ===
McDaniels was selected with the 52nd overall draft pick by the Charlotte Hornets. On October 10, 2019, he signed with the Hornets. On October 19, the contract between McDaniels and the Hornets was converted to a two-way contract, and the next day, he signed a multi-year contract with the Hornets. On October 25, 2019, McDaniels made his NBA debut, coming off the bench in a 99–121 loss to the Minnesota Timberwolves with two points and a rebound. He was assigned to the Hornets’ NBA G League affiliate, the Greensboro Swarm, for the start of the G League season. On March 9, 2020, McDaniels scored a season-high 11 points, alongside four rebounds, in a 138–143 double overtime loss to the Atlanta Hawks.

On April 7, 2021, McDaniels recorded a season-high 21 points, alongside six rebounds, three assists and two steals, in a 113–102 win over the Oklahoma City Thunder.

On October 27, 2021, McDaniels scored a season-high 16 points, alongside four rebounds, three assists and two steals, in a 120–111 win over the Orlando Magic. On December 27, he again scored 16 points, alongside three rebounds and three assists, in a 123–99 win over the Houston Rockets.

On January 16, 2023, McDaniels scored a career-high 26 points, alongside three rebounds and two steals, in a 118–130 loss to the Boston Celtics.

=== Philadelphia 76ers (2023) ===
On February 9, 2023, McDaniels was traded to the Philadelphia 76ers in a four-team trade involving the Portland Trail Blazers and New York Knicks. On February 11, McDaniels made his 76ers debut, putting up five points and five rebounds in a 101–98 win over the Brooklyn Nets.

=== Toronto Raptors (2023–2024) ===
On July 6, 2023, the Toronto Raptors signed McDaniels to a multi-year contract. On June 28, 2024, McDaniels was traded to the Sacramento Kings in exchange for Davion Mitchell, Aleksandar Vezenkov, the draft rights to Jamal Shead and a second-round pick in the 2025 NBA draft. However, on October 16, after appearing in two preseason games for the Kings, McDaniels was traded to the San Antonio Spurs, but was waived shortly after.

=== Capital City Go-Go / Washington Wizards (2024–2025) ===
On November 22, 2024, McDaniels signed with the Memphis Hustle and was traded the next day to the Capital City Go-Go. On February 22, 2025, McDaniels signed a 10-day contract with the Washington Wizards.

=== Kobe Storks (2026) ===
On July 29, 2026, McDaniels signed with the Kobe Storks of the Japanese B.League. On October 30th, the team announced that both sides mutually agreed to terminate the contract due to the player's personal reasons. During his time with the team in 11 appearances, he averaged 11.5 points, 4.1 rebounds, and 1.6 assists.

== Career statistics ==
Legend
GP	Games played	GS	Games started	MPG	Minutes per game
FG%	Field goal percentage	3P%	3-point field goal percentage	FT%	Free throw percentage
RPG	Rebounds per game	APG	Assists per game	SPG	Steals per game
BPG	Blocks per game	PPG	Points per game	**Bold**	Career high

=== NBA ===
==== Regular season ====
Year	Team	GP	GS	MPG	FG%	3P%	FT%	RPG	APG	SPG	BPG	PPG
2019–20	Charlotte	16	0	18.3	.471	.375	.824	4.1	.8	.5	.2	5.6
2020–21	Charlotte	47	18	19.2	.468	.333	.703	3.6	1.1	.6	.4	7.4
2021–22	Charlotte	55	2	16.3	.484	.380	.736	3.1	1.1	.5	.4	6.2
2022–23	Charlotte	**56**	**21**	**26.7**	.447	.322	**.846**	**4.8**	**2.0**	**1.2**	**.5**	**10.6**
2022–23	Philadelphia	24	3	17.5	**.488**	**.400**	.824	3.2	.8	.7	.2	6.7
2023–24	Toronto	50	1	10.8	.344	.169	.730	1.6	.7	.4	.1	3.4
2024–25	Washington	4	0	1.8	—	—	—	.0	.3	.3	.0	.0
Career		252	45	18.1	.449	.322	.777	3.3	1.2	.7	.3	6.7

==== Playoffs ====
Year	Team	GP	GS	MPG	FG%	3P%	FT%	RPG	APG	SPG	BPG	PPG
2023	Philadelphia	8	0	12.7	.400	.333	—	2.0	.6	.1	.0	2.4
Career		8	0	12.7	.400	.333	—	2.0	.6	.1	.0	2.4

=== College ===
Year	Team	GP	GS	MPG	FG%	3P%	FT%	RPG	APG	SPG	BPG	PPG
2017–18	San Diego State	33	21	24.7	**.586**	.211	**.788**	7.5	.9	.8	**.6**	10.5
2018–19	San Diego State	**34**	**34**	**31.0**	.466	**.320**	.732	**8.3**	**2.1**	**1.1**	.5	**15.9**
Career		67	55	27.9	.504	.298	.758	7.9	1.5	1.0	.5	13.2

== Personal life ==
McDaniels's brother, Jaden McDaniels, is a professional basketball player for the Minnesota Timberwolves. He was the number one prospect in the state of Washington, the 6th best prospect in the nation, and a McDonald's All-American. Jalen played two seasons for San Diego State before turning professional. McDaniels is the cousin of former NBA player Juwan Howard.

=== Sexual offense allegations ===
In 2019, McDaniels was charged with two civil suits alleging that three years prior, as a 17-year-old high school student, he secretly filmed an 18-year-old girl engaging in sexual acts with him on multiple occasions, and in another instance hid in a closet and filmed a 17-year-old girl engaging in sexual acts with his teammate, both without the girls’ knowledge and consent. He allegedly then shared these recordings among the basketball team via group chat. Both girls claim to have suffered severe bullying and emotional trauma from other students because of the shared recordings, with both later dropping out of school and attempting suicide. In 2019, McDaniels admitted in court to non-consensually recording the sexual acts and sharing these recordings, issued an apology, and did not face further known consequences.
