= The Hilarious World of Depression =

Comedy interview podcast

- Genre: Comedy, Interview
- Language: English

Cast and voices
- Hosted by: John Moe

Music
- Opening theme: "Pagliacci" by Rhett Miller (episodes 1–present)
- Ending theme: "Pagliacci" by Rhett Miller (episodes 1–present)

Production
- Length: About 30-45 minutes

Publication
- Original release: November 30, 2016 – June 16, 2020
- Provider: American Public Media
- Updates: Every other week

Reception
- Cited for: 2017 Webby Award Winner for Best Comedy Podcast

Related
- Website: www.hilariousworld.org

The Hilarious World of Depression (often abbreviated as THWoD) is a comedy interview podcast that was formerly distributed by American Public Media and hosted by the writer and public radio host John Moe. Regular episodes of the podcast feature Moe in conversation with comedians and other entertainers who have dealt with major depressive disorder, or "Clinny D" as Moe occasionally abbreviates it. The podcast was supported by grant funding from HealthPartners and "Make it OK," a campaign to reduce the stigma of mental illness. The end of the show was announced June 16, 2020. John Moe announced that he would be hosting a new podcast, Depresh Mode with John Moe, which is on the Maximum Fun website, and would cover additional mental health issues as well. The podcasts for The Hilarious World of Depression remain available online.

In May 2020, Moe released a book, also entitled The Hilarious World of Depression, which includes highlights from some of his interviews for the podcast as well as detailing Moe's own experiences with depression.

On August 19th, 2026, John Moe announced on Bluesky that he had acquired the intellectual property for the show from American Public Media and subsequently continue in some form.

== Reception ==
Nathan Rabin, on Vulture.com, called it "fascinating and essential." Dr. Craig Bowron, in HuffPost, writes that he would "even prescribe it for folks who are not dealing with depression." Writing for Mother Jones, Maddie Oatman described THWoD as "one part stand-up comedy and one part therapy session." USA Today named it their weekly Podcast Pick in December 2016, calling the interviews "frank and often funny."
