= Nikolai Bugaev (Soviet scientist) =

Soviet scientist (1923–2003)

Nikolai Ivanovich Bugaev
- Никола́й Ива́нович Буга́ев
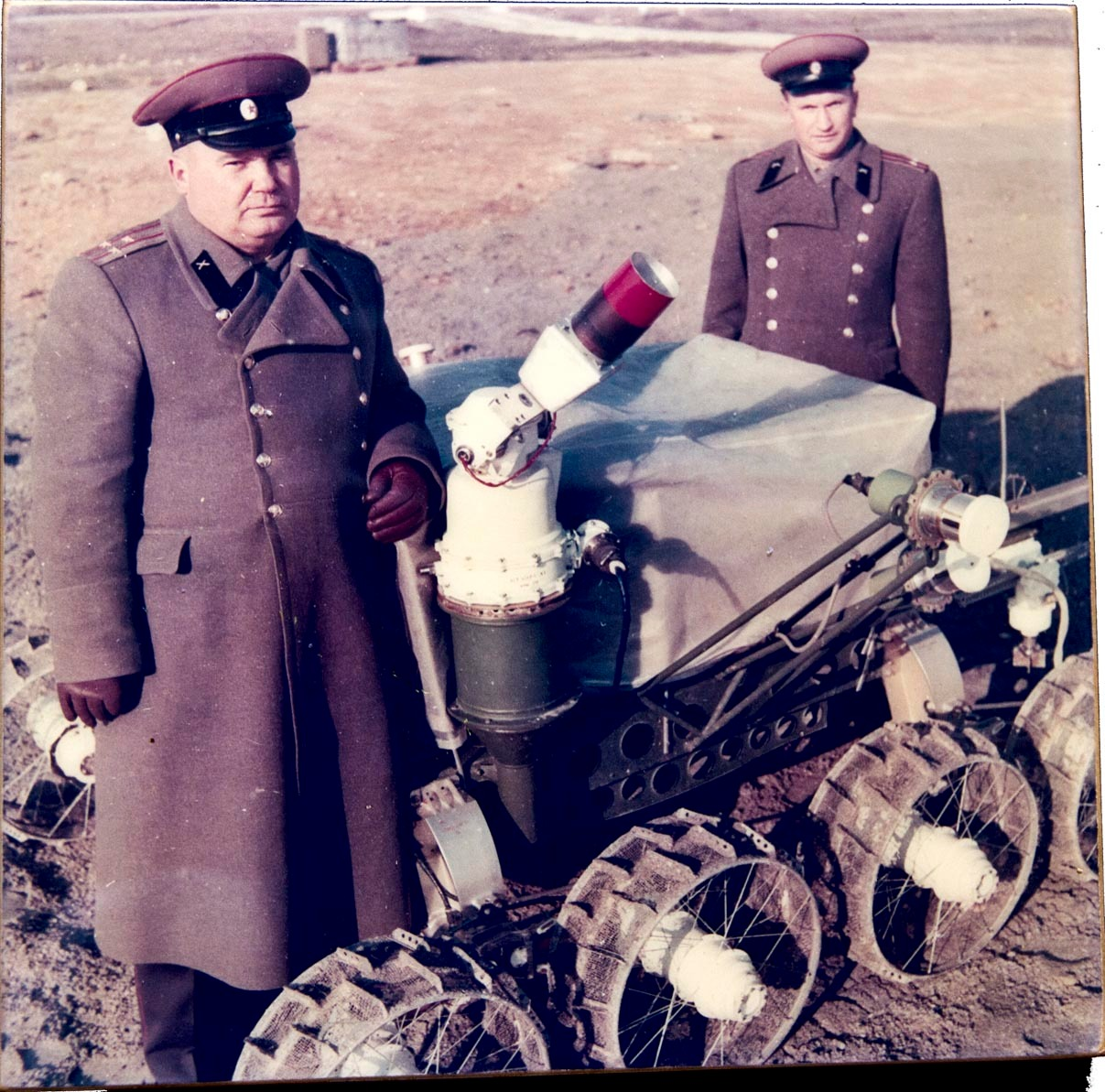
- Nikolay Bugaev (left), photo with the lunar rover

Head of the Command and Measuring Complex Center
- Preceded by: position established

Personal details
- Born: May 27, 1923 Nova Praha, Ukrainian SSR, Soviet Union
- Died: December 13, 2003 (aged 80) Moscow, Russia
- Resting place: Troyekurovskoye Cemetery, Moscow
- Party: CPSU
- Parents: Ivan Nikolaevich Bugaev (father); Anna Yakovlevna Bugaeva (mother)
- Education: Budyonny Military Academy of the Signal Corps
- Known for: organization and management of the Command and Measuring Complex Center, creation and operation of long-range space communication systems
- Awards: Order of Lenin (3); Order of the Red Star (4); Order of the Patriotic War (1st class and 2nd class); Order "For Service to the Homeland in the Armed Forces of the USSR" (3rd class); USSR State Prize (2)

Nikolai Ivanovich Bugaev (Note: Russian: Никола́й Ива́нович Буга́ев) (27 May 1923 – 13 December 2003) was a Soviet scientist and military veteran. He is best known as the founder, organizer, and head of the USSR's Command and Measuring Complex Center (CMC). (Note: The Command and Measuring Complex Center (Russian: Центр Командно-измерительного комплекса) was responsible for the flight control of all Soviet spacecraft launched for military purposes.) For his contributions and accomplishments in the field of science and technology, he was honored with the Lenin Prize.

== Early life ==
Bugaev was born on 27 May 1923 in Nova Praha, Ukrainian SSR, Soviet Union. Bugaev's father, Ivan Nikolaevich Bugaev, was the proprietor of a flour mill, bestowed upon him by a decree of Tsar Nicholas II in acknowledgment of his deeds during the World War I. Ivan Nikolaevich was also honored with two Crosses of St. George for his exploits. Bugaev's mother, Anna Yakovlevna, owned a small sewing workshop. In addition to Nikolai, the family included three younger sisters.

== Military career ==
After graduating from secondary school, Nikolai Bugaev, being an excellent student, was enrolled in the Oryol Infantry School on 17 February 1940 without the need for entrance exams. In June 1941, Bugaev, holding the rank of Lieutenant, was assigned to oversee the commanding of a platoon within the 120th Infantry Division in the Western direction. On 24 July 1941, he received his first battle injury. In September 1941, Bugaev was appointed as the commander of a company within the 43rd Army, which was under the leadership of General Konstantin Golubev. On 12 November 1941, Bugaev suffered a second, more severe injury near Naro-Fominsk.

Following his recovery from injuries sustained during the war, Bugaev was assigned to the Airborne Forces, specifically the 106 Tula Guards Division named after Kutuzov, in June 1942. He was awarded the rank of Senior lieutenant.

During his service, Bugaev participated in the first Dnieper airborne operation, where he was wounded for the third time and until the beginning of 1945 was in the reserve of the Airborne Forces. In the spring of that year, he participated in the landing and liberation of Czechoslovakia. In May 1946, he was awarded the rank of Captain.

After the end of the Great Patriotic War, Bugaev became an instructor of airborne troops, in 1946. He suffered an injury to his previously wounded leg during a night-long jump. Consequently, he was prohibited from engaging in further jumps. As a result, Bugaev switched to staff-related work.

== Education and work ==
In 1951, Bugaev completed his high school education and enrolled at the Budyonny Military Academy of the Signal Corps in Leningrad. He graduated from the academy in the spring of 1957 and was appointed as the head of a point in Eastern Siberia (known as 'Bugaev's point'). Bugaev faced challenges in settling in the uninhabited area and dealing with the harsh climate, which complicated his work. However, he successfully managed the tasks by assembling a dedicated team, ensuring the smooth operation of the point with the initial employees in 1957-1958, and making efforts to enhance the living conditions for the workers.

"Frankly speaking, it was still a bit difficult there. I had to be convinced of this, when for business purposes during the winter I visited the 'Bugaev's point', as it was referred to at the Command and Measuring Complex Center. Not only the bodies of the equipment machines were frozen through, but also the walls of the wooden residential houses. Some engineers lived there with young children, just like their chief, whose two young sons, along with their parents, bravely endured the Siberian winters."

In 1959, Bugaev was awarded the rank of Colonel. From 1959 to 1973, he served as the commander of the 10th Scientific Measuring Point. In October 1959, Bugaev had a personal meeting with Sergei Korolev He was honored as a laureate of the State Prize for the Lunar Program in 1965 and the State Prize for the Manned Space Program in 1968.

From 1965 to 1972, Bugaev collaborated with the NPO Lavochkin under the leadership of Georgy Babakin on the deep space exploration program involving the Moon, Venus, and Mars.

In July 1973, Bugaev was appointed as the Chief Engineer of the CMC (Command and Measuring Complex) and received the Lenin Prize. He was promoted to the rank of Major General in May 1977. In June 1977, Nikolai Bugaev was transferred to the military reserve with the privilege of wearing a military uniform.

== Personal life ==
During his recovery from injuries Bugaev met his future wife in the city of Gorky (now Nizhny Novgorod). On 1 February 1946, they were married and went on to have two children: Yuri (born 28 November 1946) and Alexander (born 6 March 1952). Yuri married Irina and had a daughter named Natasha, while Alexander married Valentina and had a son named Sergey and a daughter named Elena. Bugaev died on 17 December 2003 and was laid to rest at the Troyekurovskoye Cemetery in Moscow.

== Awards and honors ==
- Order of Lenin (three times)
- Order of the Red Star (four times)
- Order "For Service to the Homeland in the Armed Forces of the USSR" (3rd class)
- Order of the Patriotic War (1st and 2nd classes)
- Medal "For the Defence of Moscow", Medal "For the Victory over Germany", Medal "For Battle Merit" and others
- Twice Laureate of the State Prize of the USSR
- Participant of the Victory Parade on Red Square (among the veterans)
- Awarded with medals of the Soviet Cosmonautics Federation, as well as medals named after Korolev S.P., Gagarin Yu.A., Ryazansky M.S., Titov G.S., and others
- Holds the title of "Honoured Radioman of the USSR"
- Master of Sports in bullet shooting. High-speed shooting from a revolver. Pistol shooting at 50 meters
- Certificate of Honor from the Cabinet of Ministers of Ukraine (Note: For significant personal contribution to the development of trade and economic ties of Ukraine and on the occasion of the end of the Year of Ukraine in the Russian Federation (10 December 2002).)
