= Federal Way High School =

Public school in Federal Way, Washington, United States

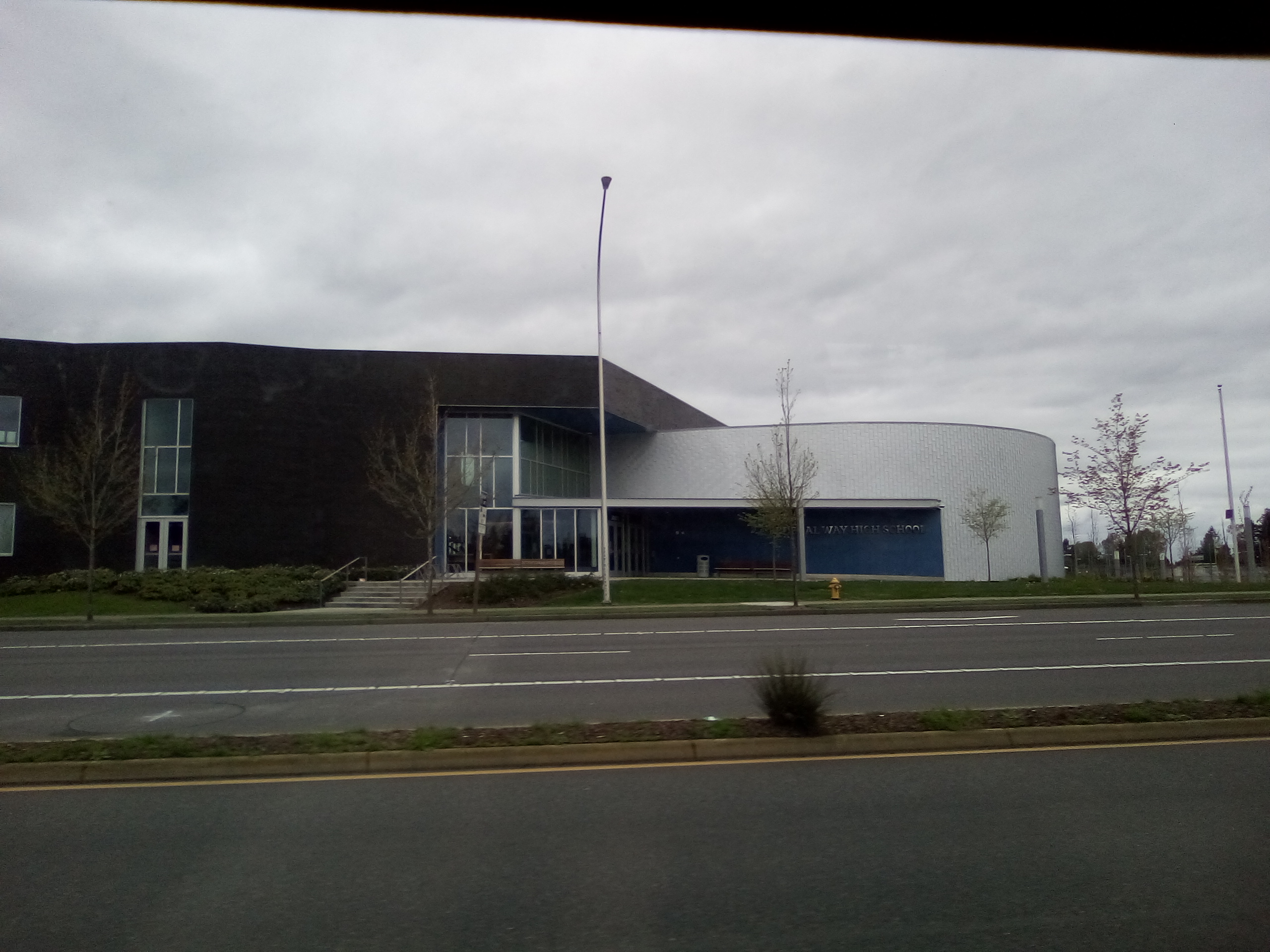

Location
- 30611 16th Avenue South; Federal Way, King County, Washington 98003; United States; 47°19′38″N 122°18′53″W

Information
- Type: Comprehensive Public High School
- Established: September 1938
- School district: Federal Way Public Schools
- NCES District ID: 5302820
- NCES School ID: 530282000435
- Principal: Matt Oberst
- Teaching staff: 80.16 (FTE)
- Grades: 9–12
- Enrollment: 1,645 (2023–2024)
- Student to teacher ratio: 20.52
- Colors: Blue and white
- Fight song: "On Federal Way High"
- Athletics conference: North Puget Sound League (NPSL) (3A)
- Mascot: Eagles
- Website: fwhs.fwps.org

Federal Way High School is a public high school located in Federal Way, Washington. It was originally built in 1938. A new campus opened in the fall of 2016.

== Athletics ==
Federal Way is in the Olympic Division of the North Puget Sound League in Washington's West Central District. The most recent successes include Boys' Basketball 4A State Championships back-to-back in 2014 and 2015 (29–0), and back-to-back State Track Titles for both boys and girls in 2013 and 2014. Boys' Baseball took a first-place finish in 2001 and second-place finishes in 2000, 2002 and 2003, and a third-place finish in 2010 in the 4A State tournament. In 2002, the boys' basketball team qualified for the State tournament, the first time since 1994. This was the start in a renewed interest and success for the basketball team.

In the 2007–08 basketball season, Federal Way finished second in the 4A State tournament, their highest finish in school history until 2014. In 2006, FWHS left the South Division of the South Puget Sound League (SPSL) and joined the North SPSL. Also in the 2007 season, the Boys' Soccer Team achieved second place in the state. Both the 2008-–09 Federal Way boys' and girls' basketball teams made the 4A Washington State Basketball tournament. The girls' team went on to finish in third while the Boys finished in first place after a 62–54 win over Garfield High School.

The 2009–10 Federal Way boys' and girls' basketball teams both made the 4A Washington State Basketball tournament again. The boys finished 3rd. Also for the 2010 Federal Way Boys' Cross country team, they went 8–0 and became SPSL South Champions. Then later on traveled to Pasco, Washington to compete in 4a Washington State Cross Country Championships. The boys later on, finished 13th place. In 1978, the Eagles Volleyball team under Coach Kathy Harris placed 3rd in the State Volleyball Tournament. The Eagles’ only other state tournament appearance came in 1988. In 1997, the Women's basketball team won the 3A state championship.

== Notable alumni ==
- Amber Pacific - Punk Rock Band (class of 2003)
- Shaun Bodiford - NFL player
- Heather Brooke - noted journalist, writer, and freedom of information activist in the United Kingdom.
- Lake Dawson - former NFL player, now a Director of Player Personnel with the NFL's Tennessee Titans.
- Cole Dickerson - current professional basketball player
- Michael Dickerson - former NBA player
- Brian Holsinger - college basketball coach
- Travis Ishikawa - former MLB player, won 2 World Series titles with the San Francisco Giants.
- Andrzej Hughes-Murray - professional wrestler
- John Moe - Author, radio and podcast host.
- Dan Spillner - former MLB player (San Diego Padres, Cleveland Indians, Chicago White Sox)
- Donny Marshall - former NBA player, 2x Sports Emmy winner and current NBA/NCAA basketball analyst for FOX Sports
- Kyle Secor - American television and movie actor
- Ross Shafer - comedian and television host turned motivational speaker
- Kelyn Rowe - Major League Soccer New England Revolution
- Charlie Taumoepeau - NFL player
- Jalen McDaniels - NBA player, currently unsigned
- Jaden McDaniels - NBA player, currently plays for Minnesota Timberwolves
- Tari Eason - NBA player, currently plays for Houston Rockets
