= 2019 Diamond Head Classic =

College basketball competition

- Season: 2019–20
- Teams: 8
- Finals site: Stan Sheriff Center; Honolulu, Hawaii
- Champions: Houston (1st title)
- Runner-up: Washington (1st title game)
- Semifinalists: Georgia Tech (1st semifinal); Hawai'i (4th semifinal)
- Winning coach: Kelvin Sampson (1st title)
- MVP: Fabian White Jr. (Houston)

The 2019 Diamond Head Classic was a mid-season eight-team college basketball tournament that was played on December 22, 23, and 25 at the Stan Sheriff Center in Honolulu, Hawaii. It was the eleventh annual Diamond Head Classic tournament, and was part of the 2019–20 NCAA Division I men's basketball season.

== Campus site games ==
Date	Time	Away		Home		Venue	Attendance	Source
December 13, 2019	10:00 p.m. EST	Evergreen State	55	Portland	77	Chiles Center • Portland, OR	1,048	
December 18, 2019	7:00 p.m. EST	Ball State	65	Georgia Tech	47	McCamish Pavilion • Atlanta, GA	4,203	
December 19, 2019	8:00 p.m. EST	UTEP	57	Houston	77	Fertitta Center • Houston, TX	6,470	

== Bracket ==
5th Place Game; December 25
Boise State	72
UTEP	67
7th Place Game; December 25
Portland	46
Ball State	61

Consolation 2nd Round; December 23
Portland	69
Boise State	85
Ball State	70
UTEP	71

First Round; December 22
Houston	81
Portland	56
Georgia Tech	74
Boise State	60
Ball State	64
Washington	85
UTEP	63
Hawai’i	67

Semifinals; December 23
Houston	70
Georgia Tech	59
Washington	72
Hawaii	61

Championship; December 25
Houston	75
Washington	71
3rd Place Game; December 25
Georgia Tech	70
Hawai’i	53

== Tournament games ==
=== Quarterfinals ===
Date	Time	Matchup				TV	Source
December 22, 2019	3:00 p.m. EST	Houston	81	Portland	56	ESPNU	
December 22, 2019	5:00 p.m. EST	Georgia Tech	74	Boise State	60	ESPNU	
December 22, 2019	9:30 p.m. EST	Ball State	64	Washington	85	ESPN2	
December 22, 2019	11:30 p.m. EST	UTEP	63	Hawai'i	67	ESPN2	

=== 5th–8th place playoffs ===
Date	Time	Matchup				TV	Source
December 23, 2019	4:30 p.m. EST	Portland	69	Boise State	85	ESPNU	
December 24, 2019	1:30 a.m. EST	Ball State	70	UTEP	71	ESPNU	

=== 7th place game ===
Date	Time	Matchup				TV	Source
December 25, 2019	1:30 p.m. EST	Portland	46	Ball State	61	ESPNU	

=== 5th place game ===
Date	Time	Matchup				TV	Source
December 25, 2019	3:30 p.m. EST	Boise State	72	UTEP	67	ESPNU	

=== Semifinals ===
Date	Time	Matchup				TV	Source
December 23, 2019	7:00 p.m. EST	Houston	70	Georgia Tech	59	ESPN2	
December 23, 2019	11:00 p.m. EST	Washington	72	Hawai'i	61	ESPN2	

=== 3rd place game ===
Date	Time	Matchup				TV	Source
December 25, 2019	6:30 p.m. EST	Georgia Tech	70	Hawai'i	53	ESPNU	

=== Championship ===
Date	Time	Matchup				TV	Source
December 25, 2019	8:30 p.m. EST	Houston	75	Washington	71	ESPN2	
