= Santee, South Carolina =

- Town
- The 18th hole at the Santee-Cooper Country Club, showing the I-95 causeway crossing Lake Marion at Santee
- Motto: "It's a Brand New Day in Santee"
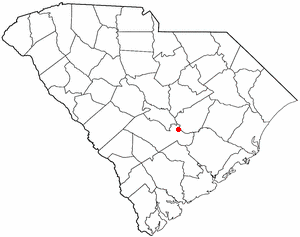
- Location in Orangeburg County, South Carolina
- Coordinates: 33°29′N 80°29′W
- Country: United States
- State: South Carolina
- County: Orangeburg

Government
  - Type: Mayor–council government
  - Mayor: Donnie Hilliard

Area
  - Total: 2.44 sq mi (6.33 km^{2})
  - Land: 2.42 sq mi (6.28 km^{2})
  - Water: 0.019 sq mi (0.05 km^{2})
- Elevation: 131 ft (40 m)

Population (2020)
  - Total: 797
  - Density: 328.6/sq mi (126.86/km^{2})
- Time zone: UTC-5 (EST)
  - Summer (DST): UTC-4 (EDT)
- ZIP code: 29142
- Area codes: 803, 839
- FIPS code: 45-63790
- GNIS feature ID: 2407287
- Website: townofsantee-sc.org

Santee is a town in Orangeburg County along the Santee River Valley in central South Carolina, United States. It has become a resort town of note located centrally north-south along the Atlantic Seaboard of South Carolina. The region has been rural, with a primarily agricultural economy typical of Orangeburg County, but is now known primarily for its several golf courses in proximity to Lake Marion, Santee State Park and other Lake Marion attractions. Interstate 95 connects its attractions easily with tourists traveling by automobile. I-95 crosses a narrow arm of the lake into the town lands, along a causeway. Lake Marion is a man-made hydroelectric reservoir, which at 110,000 acres (450 km2, 173 sq mi) is one of the fifty largest lakes in the country.

The population was 797 at the 2020 census. The town has been undergoing economic and population growth, and development as rural niches are supplanted by bedroom communities.

Construction of the Santee Cooper Regional Water System can provide millions of gallons of potable water per day to the surrounding five counties centered about Santee. The system was coordinated by the U.S. Department of Agriculture and funded by the Army Corps of Engineers, USEPA, and the South Carolina Department of Commerce. The plant was completed and operational as of June 1, 2008. Work to connect the plant to the five counties (Berkeley, Orangeburg, Dorchester, Calhoun, and Sumter) is underway and being overseen and funded by the same parties. Currently, the RWS serves the town of Santee, with pipeline rapidly being installed to other locations. Incoming businesses from this project are projected to bring thousands of jobs to the area.

The Lake Marion High School & Technology Center is located in the town.

== Geography ==
According to the United States Census Bureau, the town has a total area of 2.0 square miles (5.3 km^{2}), of which 2.0 square miles (5.2 km^{2}) is land and 0.49% is water.

== Main roads ==
- I-95
- US 301
- US 15
- SC 6

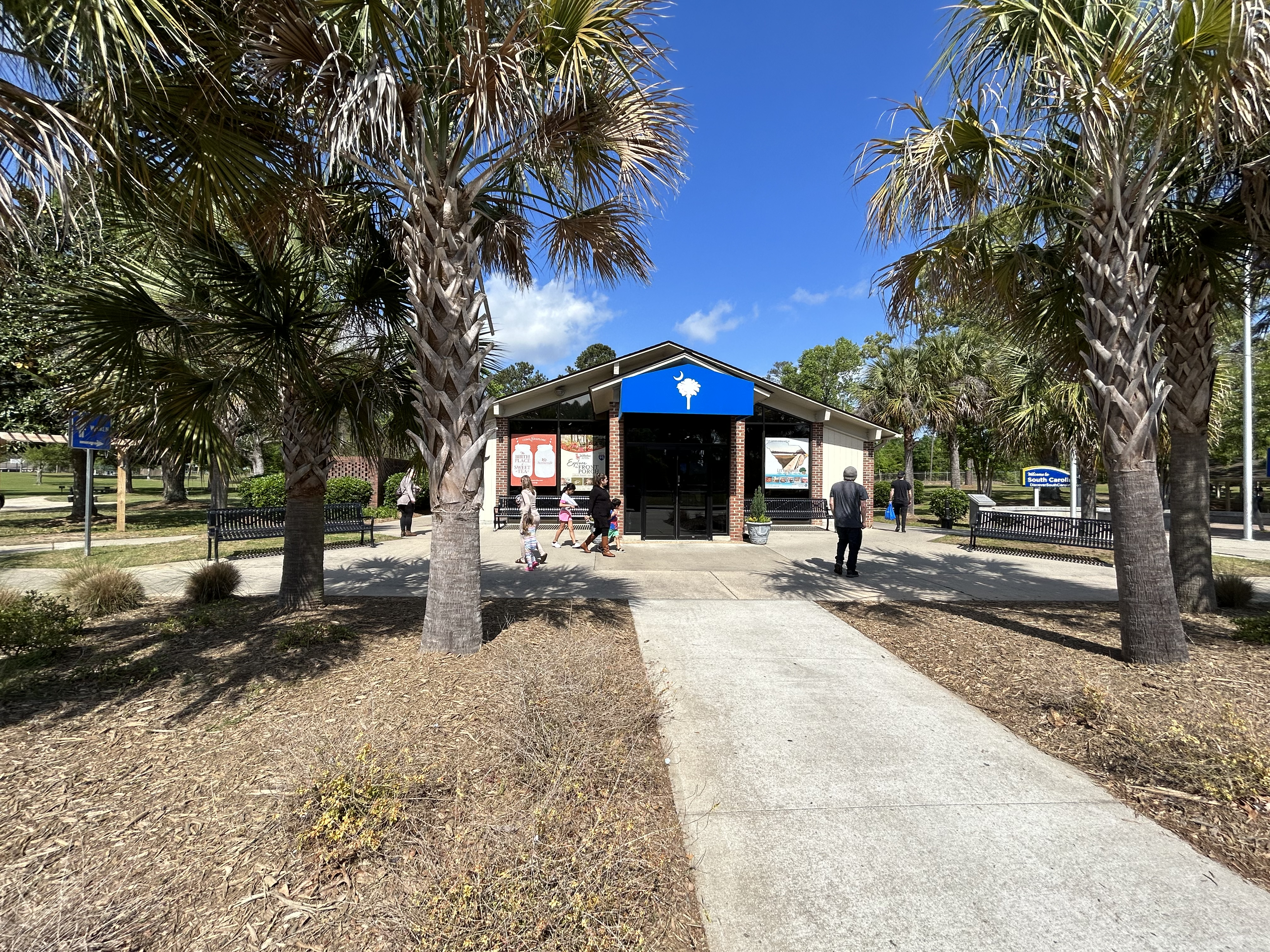
The Santee Welcome Center off I-95

== Demographics ==
Historical population
Census	Pop.	Note	%±
1950	107		—
1960	105		−1.9%
1970	137		30.5%
1980	280		104.4%
1990	638		127.9%
2000	740		16.0%
2010	961		29.9%
2020	797		−17.1%
U.S. Decennial Census

=== 2020 census ===
Santee town, South Carolina – Racial and ethnic composition Note: the US Census treats Hispanic/Latino as an ethnic category. This table excludes Latinos from the racial categories and assigns them to a separate category. Hispanics/Latinos may be of any race.
Race / Ethnicity (NH = Non-Hispanic)	Pop 2000	Pop 2010	Pop 2020	% 2000	% 2010	% 2020
White alone (NH)	206	255	208	27.84%	26.53%	26.10%
Black or African American alone (NH)	523	628	525	70.68%	65.35%	65.87%
Native American or Alaska Native alone (NH)	0	0	2	0.00%	0.00%	0.25%
Asian alone (NH)	1	26	31	0.14%	2.71%	3.89%
Native Hawaiian or Pacific Islander alone (NH)	0	0	0	0.00%	0.00%	0.00%
Other race alone (NH)	0	2	4	0.00%	0.21%	0.50%
Mixed race or Multiracial (NH)	4	18	16	0.54%	1.87%	2.01%
Hispanic or Latino (any race)	6	32	11	0.81%	3.33%	1.38%
Total	740	961	797	100.00%	100.00%	100.00%

As of the 2020 United States census, there were 797 people, 394 households, and 241 families residing in the town.

=== 2000 census ===
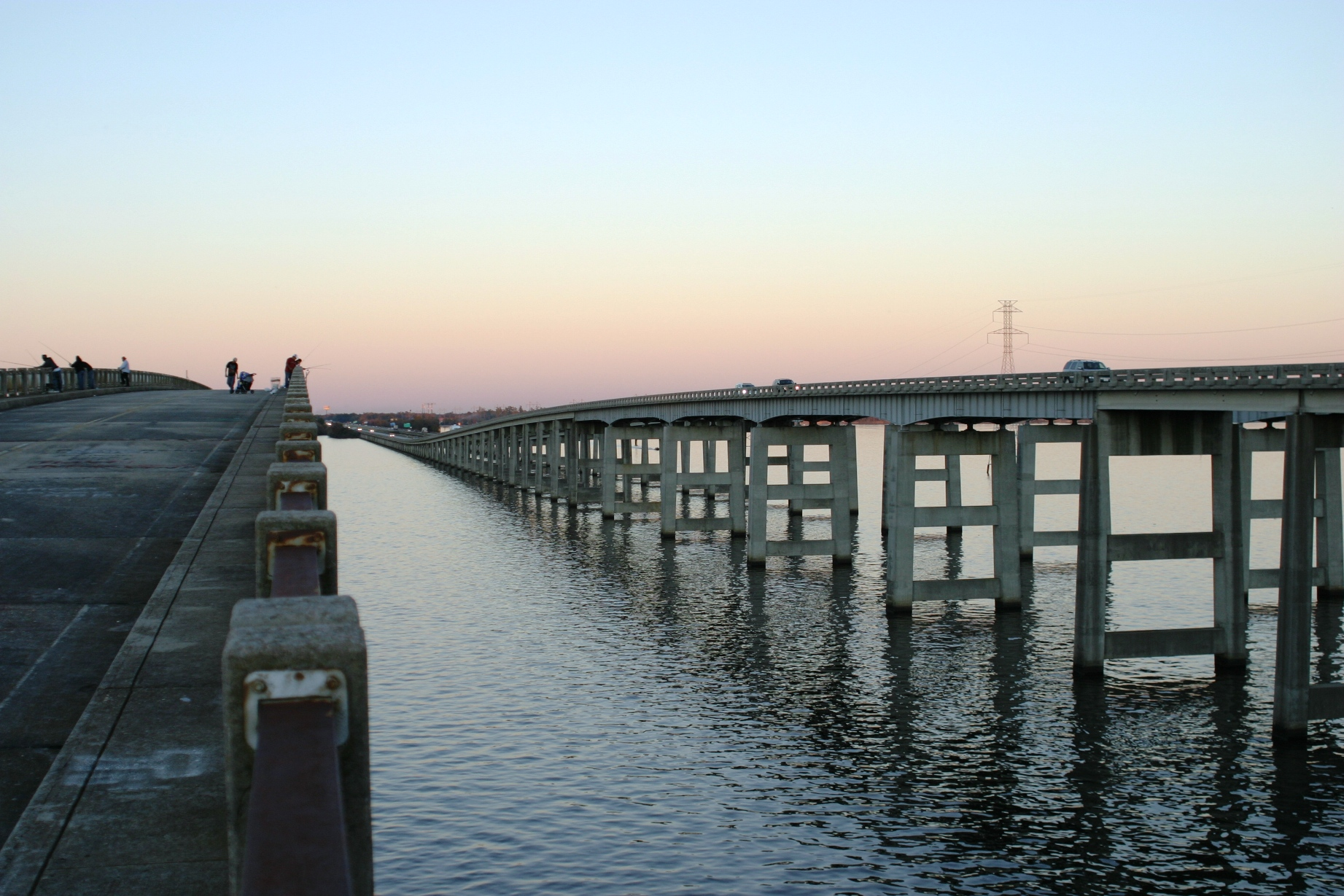
Interstate 95 bridge over Lake Marion, Santee, SC; The old (bypassed road) bridge/causeway is used as fishing pier. Man-made in the 1930s on the farmlands and marshes of the Santee River valley, Lake Marion is famous for trophy-quality game fish, especially largemouth bass.

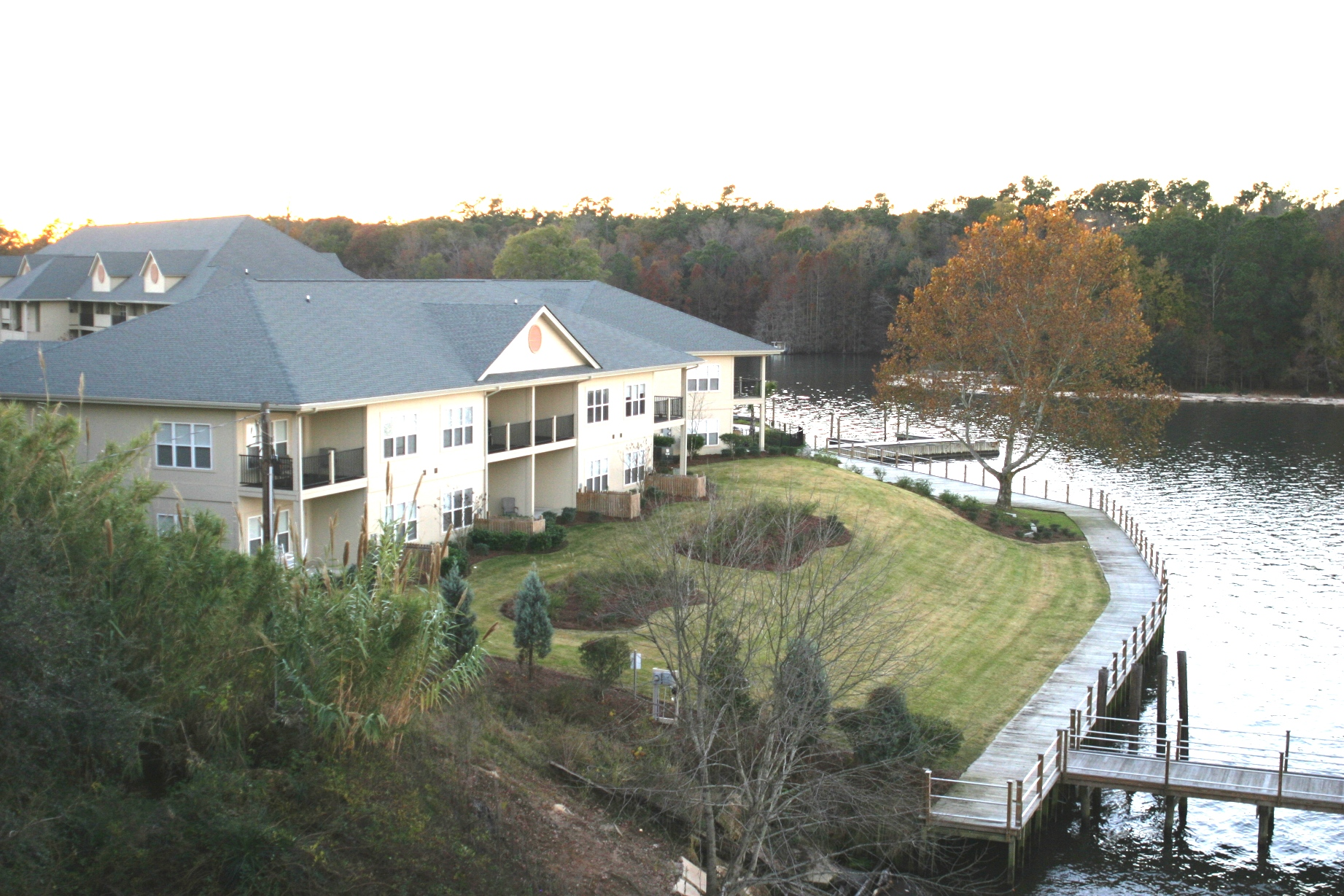
New condominium by Lake Marion, Santee, SC

As of the census of 2000, there were 740 people, 310 households, and 221 families residing in the town. The population density was 367.4 inhabitants per square mile (141.9/km^{2}). There were 394 housing units at an average density of 195.6 per square mile (75.5/km^{2}). The racial makeup of the town was 28.11% White, 70.68% African American, 0.14% Asian, 0.54% from other races, and 0.54% from two or more races. Hispanic or Latino of any race were 0.81% of the population.

There were 310 households, out of which 27.4% had children under the age of 18 living with them, 41.0% were married couples living together, 26.8% had a female householder with no husband present, and 28.7% were non-families. 26.5% of all households were made up of individuals, and 14.2% had someone living alone who was 65 years of age or older. The average household size was 2.39 and the average family size was 2.85.

In the town, the population was spread out, with 25.3% under the age of 18, 10.4% from 18 to 24, 20.4% from 25 to 44, 18.8% from 45 to 64, and 25.1% who were 65 years of age or older. The median age was 39 years. For every 100 females, there were 73.7 males. For every 100 females age 18 and over, there were 66.6 males.

The median income for a household in the town was $22,292, and the median income for a family was $28,393. Males had a median income of $27,083 versus $16,650 for females. The per capita income for the town was $15,353. About 27.5% of families and 32.9% of the population were below the poverty line, including 46.1% of those under age 18 and 17.8% of those age 65 or over.

== Education ==
Santee has a public library, a branch of the Orangeburg County Library.

== Notable people ==
- Robert Blake, Medal of Honor recipient.
- James Clyburn, US representative
