= Lake Marion High School & Technology Center =

Location
- 3656 Tee Vee Road; Santee, South Carolina 29142; United States

Information
- School type: Public high school
- School district: Orangeburg County Consolidated School District
- Principal: Sean Glover
- Teaching staff: 40.80 (FTE)
- Enrollment: 701 (2023–2024)
- Student to teacher ratio: 17.18
- Color(s): Green and black
- Mascot: Gators
- Website: www.ocsdsc.org/Domain/36

Lake Marion High School & Technology Center (LMHS) is a four-year public high school in Santee, South Carolina. It is one of the many high schools in Orangeburg County School District. It serves as the opening for two middle schools, Lake Marion Middle School and Holly Hill-Roberts Middle School.
