= Bill Radke =

Bill Radke is an American radio talk show host, web video host, author, comedian and columnist. As of 2021, he hosts Seattle's KUOW-FM's Week In Review, and hosted The Record from 2013 until 2021. From November 1, 2010 to October 2012 he hosted Seattle's Morning News on KIRO-FM 97.3 with Linda Thomas in the 5 am to 9 am time slot.

Previously he had been hosting American Public Media's Marketplace Morning Report, a daily business/economy newscast. He also contributed humorous news and commentary segments to KUOW's long-running show Sandy Bradley's Pot Luck, created and hosted the satire show Rewind, distributed by National Public Radio (NPR), and co-hosted the radio show Weekend America, produced by American Public Media. As a stand-up comedian, he won the 1992 Seattle International Comedy Competition. Radke authored the book Seattle and wrote a weekly humor column in the Seattle Post-Intelligencer. He lives in Mercer Island, Washington.

== Bibliography ==
- Radke, Bill; Souders, Paul (2003). Seattle. Seattle: Sasquatch Books. ISBN 1-57061-276-5.
