= 2016–17 Arizona State Sun Devils men's basketball team =

American college basketball season

2016–17 Arizona State Sun Devils men's basketball
- Conference: Pac-12 Conference
- Record: 15–18 (7–11 Pac–12)
- Head coach: Bobby Hurley (2nd season)
- Assistant coaches: Rashon Bruno; Levi Watkins; Anthony Coleman
- Home arena: Wells Fargo Arena

2016–17 Pac-12 Conference men's basketball standings
	Conf.				Overall
Team	W		L	PCT	W		L	PCT
No. 9 Oregon	16	–	2	.889	33	–	6	.846
No. 4 Arizona †	16	–	2	.889	32	–	5	.865
No. 8 UCLA	15	–	3	.833	31	–	5	.861
Utah	11	–	7	.611	20	–	12	.625
California	10	–	8	.556	21	–	13	.618
USC	10	–	8	.556	26	–	10	.722
Colorado	8	–	10	.444	19	–	15	.559
Arizona State	7	–	11	.389	15	–	18	.455
Stanford	6	–	12	.333	14	–	17	.452
Washington State	6	–	12	.333	13	–	18	.419
Washington	2	–	16	.111	9	–	22	.290
Oregon State	1	–	17	.056	5	–	27	.156
† Pac-12 Tournament winner Rankings from AP poll

The 2016–17 Arizona State Sun Devils men's basketball team represented Arizona State University during the 2016–17 NCAA Division I men's basketball season. The Sun Devils were led by second-year head coach Bobby Hurley, and played their home games at Wells Fargo Arena in Tempe, Arizona as members of Pac–12 Conference. The Sun Devils finished the season 15–18, 7–11 in Pac-12 play to finish in eighth place. In the Pac-12 tournament, they defeated Stanford in the first round before losing to Oregon in the quarterfinals

== Previous season ==
The Sun Devils finished the 2015–16 season 15–17, 5–13 in Pac-12 play to finish in 11th place. They lost in the first round of the Pac-12 tournament to Oregon State.

== Off-season ==
=== Departures ===
Name	Number	Pos.	Height	Weight	Year	Hometown	Notes
Eric Jacobsen	21	F	6'10"	240	Senior	Chandler, AZ	Graduated
Willie Atwood	2	F	6'7"	215	Senior	Memphis, TN	Graduated
Gerry Blakes	4	G	6'4"	195	Senior	Inglewood, CA	Graduated
Savon Goodman	11	F	6'6"	220	Junior	Philadelphia, PA	Transferred to La Salle

=== 2016 recruiting class ===
College recruiting information
Name	Hometown	School	Height	Weight	Commit date
Sam Cunliffe; SF	Seattle, WA	Rainier Beach High School	6 ft 6 in (1.98 m)	190 lb (86 kg)	Jun 10, 2015
Sam Cunliffe; SF	Recruit ratings: Scout: Rivals: 247Sports: ESPN:				
Jethro Tshisumpa; C	Grundy, VA	Mountain Mission School	6 ft 9 in (2.06 m)	250 lb (110 kg)	Jul 28, 2015
Jethro Tshisumpa; C	Recruit ratings: Scout: Rivals: 247Sports: ESPN:				
Vitaliy Shibel; PF	Lee, ME	Lee Academy	6 ft 9 in (2.06 m)	215 lb (98 kg)	Jan 19, 2016
Vitaliy Shibel; PF	Recruit ratings: Scout: Rivals: 247Sports: ESPN:				
Romello White; PF	Marietta, GA	Joseph Wheeler High School	6 ft 9 in (2.06 m)	220 lb (100 kg)	May 19, 2016
Romello White; PF	Recruit ratings: Scout: Rivals: 247Sports: ESPN:				
Overall recruit ranking: Scout: #21 Rivals: #31 247Sports: #14 ESPN: #23
Note: In many cases, Scout, Rivals, 247Sports, On3, and ESPN may conflict in their listings of height and weight.; In these cases, the average was taken. ESPN grades are on a 100-point scale.; Sources:

=== 2017 recruiting class ===
College recruiting information (2017)
Name	Hometown	School	Height	Weight	Commit date
Remy Martin; PG	Chatsworth, CA	Sierra Canyon School	6 ft 0 in (1.83 m)	170 lb (77 kg)	Jun 9, 2016
Remy Martin; PG	Recruit ratings: Scout: Rivals: 247Sports: ESPN: (80)				
Kimani Lawrence; SF	Providence, RI	New Hampton School	6 ft 6 in (1.98 m)	186 lb (84 kg)	Nov 10, 2016
Kimani Lawrence; SF	Recruit ratings: Scout: Rivals: 247Sports: ESPN: (86)				
Kenny Wooten; PF	Manteca, CA	Trinity International	6 ft 8 in (2.03 m)	205 lb (93 kg)	Dec 20, 2016
Kenny Wooten; PF	Recruit ratings: Scout: Rivals: 247Sports: ESPN: (80)				
Overall recruit ranking:
Note: In many cases, Scout, Rivals, 247Sports, On3, and ESPN may conflict in their listings of height and weight.; In these cases, the average was taken. ESPN grades are on a 100-point scale.; Sources:

== Roster ==
2016–17 Arizona State Sun Devils men's basketball team
Players
Coaches

Pos.	#	Name	Height	Weight	Year	Previous school	Hometown
G	0	Tra Holder	6 ft 1 in (1.85 m)	180 lb (82 kg)	Jr	Brentwood School	Los Angeles, California
G/F	1	Maurice O'Field	6 ft 5 in (1.96 m)	205 lb (93 kg)	Sr	Midland College	Cleveland, Ohio
G	4	Torian Graham	6 ft 5 in (1.96 m)	195 lb (88 kg)	RS Jr	Chipola College	Durham, North Carolina
F	5	Obinna Oleka	6 ft 8 in (2.03 m)	225 lb (102 kg)	Sr	Cecil C.C.	Washington, D.C.
G	11	Shannon Evans	6 ft 1 in (1.85 m)	160 lb (73 kg)	RS Jr	Buffalo	Suffolk, Virginia
F	12	Andre Adams	6 ft 9 in (2.06 m)	225 lb (102 kg)	RS Fr	IMG Academy	Avondale, Arizona
F	13	Vitaliy Shibel (injured)	6 ft 9 in (2.06 m)	210 lb (95 kg)	Fr	Lee Academy	Lee, Maine
G	22	Austin Witherill (W)	6 ft 0 in (1.83 m)	170 lb (77 kg)	Jr	Highland HS	Gilbert, Arizona
F	23	Romello White (redshirt)	6 ft 8 in (2.03 m)	220 lb (100 kg)	Fr	Joseph Wheeler HS	Suwanee, Georgia
F	33	Ramon Vila	6 ft 8 in (2.03 m)	230 lb (104 kg)	Fr	FC Barcelona	Barcelona, Spain
F/C	42	Jethro Tshisumpa	6 ft 10 in (2.08 m)	260 lb (118 kg)	Fr	Mountain Mission School	DR Congo
G	44	Kodi Justice	6 ft 5 in (1.96 m)	190 lb (86 kg)	Jr	Dobson HS	Mesa, Arizona

Head coach

- Bobby Hurley (Duke)

Assistant coach(es)

- Rashon Bruno (DePaul)
- Levi Watkins (NC State)
- Anthony Coleman (Long Beach State)

Legend

- (C) Team captain
- (S) Suspended
- (I) Ineligible
- (W) Walk-on
- Injured
- Current redshirt

Roster
Last update: Dec 13, 2016

- Freshman Sam Cunliffe left team 10 games into the season and elected to transfer.

== Schedule and results ==
Date time, TV	Rank^{#}	Opponent^{#}	Result	Record	Site (attendance) city, state
Exhibition
Nov. 3, 2016*; 7:00 pm		UC Santa Cruz	W 98–53	–	Wells Fargo Arena; Tempe, AZ
Non-conference regular season
Nov. 11, 2016*; 7:00 pm, P12N		Portland State	W 88–70	1–0	Wells Fargo Arena (7,398); Tempe, AZ
Nov. 13, 2016*; 7:00 pm, P12N		Cal Poly	W 96–74	2–0	Wells Fargo Arena (4,155); Tempe, AZ
Nov. 17, 2016*; 2:30 pm, ESPNU		vs. Northern Iowa; Tire Pros Invitational quarterfinal	L 63–82	2–1	HP Field House; Orlando, FL
Nov. 18, 2016*; 3:00 pm, ESPNU		vs. Tulane; Tire Pros Invitational 2nd round consolation	W 80–71	3–1	HP Field House; Orlando, FL
Nov. 20, 2016*; 12:30 pm, ESPNU		vs. Davidson; Tire Pros Invitational 5th place game	L 60–68	3–2	HP Field House; Orlando, FL
Nov. 23, 2016*; 2:00 pm, P12N		The Citadel	W 127–110	4–2	Wells Fargo Arena (4,702); Tempe, AZ
Nov. 28, 2016*; 5:00 pm, ESPN2		vs. No. 1 Kentucky; Atlantis Showcase	L 69–115	4–3	Imperial Arena (1,200); Nassau, BS
Dec. 3, 2016*; 6:00 pm, P12N		UNLV	W 97–73	5–3	Wells Fargo Arena (7,707); Tempe, AZ
Dec. 6, 2016*; 5:00 pm, ESPN		vs. No. 18 Purdue; Jimmy V Classic	L 64–97	5–4	Madison Square Garden (15,294); New York, NY
Dec. 10, 2016*; 5:00 pm, CBSSN		at San Diego State	W 74–63	6–4	Viejas Arena (12,414); San Diego, CA
Dec. 17, 2016*; 6:00 pm, P12N		New Mexico State	L 70–81	6–5	Wells Fargo Arena (5,426); Tempe, AZ
Dec. 20, 2016*; 7:00 pm, ESPN2		No. 9 Creighton	L 85–96	6–6	Wells Fargo Arena (6,793); Tempe, AZ
Dec. 22, 2016*; 1:00 pm, P12N		Central Arkansas	W 98–62	7–6	Wells Fargo Arena (4,479); Tempe, AZ
Pac-12 regular season
Dec. 30, 2016; 7:00 pm, P12N		at Stanford	W 98–93	8–6 (1–0)	Maples Pavilion (3,595); Stanford, CA
Jan. 1, 2017; 8:00 pm, P12N		at California	L 65–81	8–7 (1–1)	Haas Pavilion (8,776); Berkeley, CA
Jan. 5, 2017; 7:00 pm, P12N		Colorado	W 78–77	9–7 (2–1)	Wells Fargo Arena (5,147); Tempe, AZ
Jan. 7, 2017; 3:00 pm, P12N		Utah	L 82–88	9–8 (2–2)	Wells Fargo Arena (6,501); Tempe, AZ
Jan. 12, 2017; 7:00 pm, ESPN2		at No. 16 Arizona; Rivalry	L 75–91	9–9 (2–3)	McKale Center (14,644); Tucson, AZ
Jan. 19, 2017; 9:00 pm, FS1		at No. 3 UCLA	L 80–102	9–10 (2–4)	Pauley Pavilion (12,689); Los Angeles, CA
Jan. 22, 2017; 6:30 pm, ESPNU		at USC	L 79–82	9–11 (2–5)	Galen Center (2,931); Los Angeles, CA
Jan. 25, 2017; 9:00 pm, ESPNU		Washington	W 86–75	10–11 (3–5)	Wells Fargo Arena (5,129); Tempe, AZ
Jan. 29, 2017; 12:00 pm, P12N		Washington State	L 83–91	10–12 (3–6)	Wells Fargo Arena (5,554); Tempe, AZ
Feb. 2, 2017; 9:00 pm, FS1		at No. 13 Oregon	L 70–71	10–13 (3–7)	Matthew Knight Arena (11,901); Eugene, OR
Feb. 4, 2017; 4:00 pm, P12N		at Oregon State	W 81–63	11–13 (4–7)	Gill Coliseum (4,927); Corvallis, OR
Feb. 8, 2017; 9:00 pm, ESPNU		California	L 43–68	11–14 (4–8)	Wells Fargo Arena (5,107); Tempe, AZ
Feb. 11, 2016; 6:00 pm, P12N		Stanford	W 75–69	12–14 (5–8)	Wells Fargo Arena (8,206); Tempe, AZ
Feb. 16, 2017; 9:00 pm, FS1		at Washington	W 83–81	13–14 (6–8)	Alaska Airlines Arena (6,910); Seattle, WA
Feb. 18, 2017; 3:00 pm, P12N		at Washington State	L 71–86	13–15 (6–9)	Beasley Coliseum (3,344); Pullman, WA
Feb. 23, 2017; 7:00 pm, ESPN2		No. 5 UCLA	L 75–87	13–16 (6–10)	Wells Fargo Arena (10,176); Tempe, AZ
Feb. 26, 2017; 4:30 pm, P12N		USC	W 83–82	14–16 (7–10)	Wells Fargo Arena (8,037); Tempe, AZ
Mar. 4, 2017; 2:00 pm, CBS		No. 7 Arizona; Rivalry	L 60–73	14–17 (7–11)	Wells Fargo Arena (9,494); Tempe, AZ
Pac-12 tournament
Mar 8, 2017; 1:00 pm, P12N	(8)	vs. (9) Stanford; First round	W 98–88 ^{OT}	15–17	T-Mobile Arena (7,846); Paradise, NV
Mar 9, 2017; 1:00 pm, P12N	(8)	vs. (1) No. 5 Oregon; Quarterfinals	L 57–80	15–18	T-Mobile Arena (12,782); Paradise, NV
*Non-conference game. ^{#}Rankings from AP Poll. (#) Tournament seedings in parentheses. All times are in Mountain Time.
