= 2017 Pac-12 Conference men's basketball tournament =

- Classification: Division I
- Season: 2016–17
- Teams: 12
- Site: T-Mobile Arena; Paradise, Nevada
- Champions: Arizona Wildcats (6th title)
- Winning coach: Sean Miller (2nd title)
- MVP: Allonzo Trier (Arizona)
- Television: Pac-12 Network; ESPN

2016–17 Pac-12 Conference men's basketball standings
	Conf.				Overall
Team	W		L	PCT	W		L	PCT
No. 9 Oregon	16	–	2	.889	33	–	6	.846
No. 4 Arizona †	16	–	2	.889	32	–	5	.865
No. 8 UCLA	15	–	3	.833	31	–	5	.861
Utah	11	–	7	.611	20	–	12	.625
California	10	–	8	.556	21	–	13	.618
USC	10	–	8	.556	26	–	10	.722
Colorado	8	–	10	.444	19	–	15	.559
Arizona State	7	–	11	.389	15	–	18	.455
Stanford	6	–	12	.333	14	–	17	.452
Washington State	6	–	12	.333	13	–	18	.419
Washington	2	–	16	.111	9	–	22	.290
Oregon State	1	–	17	.056	5	–	27	.156
† Pac-12 Tournament winner Rankings from AP poll

The 2017 Pac-12 Conference men's basketball tournament was the postseason men's basketball tournament for the Pac-12 Conference and was played during March 8–11, 2017 at T-Mobile Arena in Paradise, Nevada. The champion, Arizona, received the Pac-12 conference automatic bid to the 2017 NCAA tournament with an 83–80 win over Oregon in the finals.

== Seeds ==
Teams will be seeded by conference record, with ties broken in the following order:

- Record between the tied teams
- Record against the highest-seeded team not involved in the tie, going down through the seedings as necessary
- Higher RPI
- Head-to-head

Seed	School	Conference	Overall	Tiebreaker
1	Oregon†#	16–2	27–4	1–0 vs. Arizona
2	Arizona†#	16–2	27–4	0–1 vs. Oregon
3	UCLA#	15–3	28–3	
4	Utah#	11–7	20–10	
5	California	10–8	19–11	1–0 vs. USC
6	USC	10–8	23–8	0–1 vs. California
7	Colorado	8–10	18–13	
8	Arizona State	7–11	14–17	
9	Stanford	6–12	14–16	1–0 vs. Washington State
10	Washington State	6–12	13–17	0–1 vs. Stanford
11	Washington	2–16	9–21	
12	Oregon State	1–17	5–26	
† – Pac-12 Conference regular season co-champions # – Received a first-round bye in the conference tournament * – Overall record at end of regular season

== Schedule ==
Game	Time*	Matchup	Score	Television	Attendance
First round – Wednesday, March 8
1	12:00 pm	No. 8 Arizona State vs. No. 9 Stanford	98–88^{OT}	Pac-12 Network	7,846
2	2:30 pm	No. 5 California vs. No. 12 Oregon State	67–62	Pac-12 Network	7,846
3	6:00 pm	No. 7 Colorado vs. No. 10 Washington State	73–63	Pac-12 Network	9,978
4	8:30 pm	No. 6 USC vs. No. 11 Washington	78–73	Pac-12 Network	9,978
Quarterfinals – Thursday, March 9
5	12:00 pm	No. 1 Oregon vs. No. 8 Arizona State	80–57	Pac-12 Network	12,782
6	2:30 pm	No. 4 Utah vs. No. 5 California	75–78	Pac-12 Network	12,782
7	6:00 pm	No. 2 Arizona vs. No. 7 Colorado	92–78	Pac-12 Network	18,153
8	8:30 pm	No. 3 UCLA vs. No. 6 USC	76–74	ESPN	18,153
Semifinals – Friday, March 10
9	6:00 pm	No. 1 Oregon vs No. 5 California	73–65	Pac-12 Network	19,224
10	8:30 pm	No. 2 Arizona vs No. 3 UCLA	86–75	ESPN	19,224
Championship – Saturday, March 11
11	8:00 pm	No. 1 Oregon vs No. 2 Arizona	80–83	ESPN	18,927
*Game times in PT. Rankings denote tournament seed.

== Bracket ==
First round Wednesday, March 8
8	Arizona State	98*
9	Stanford	88
5	California	67
12	Oregon State	62
7	Colorado	73
10	Washington State	63
6	USC	78
11	Washington	73

Quarterfinals; Thursday, March 9
1	#5 Oregon	80
8	Arizona State	57
4	Utah	75
5	California	78
2	#7 Arizona	92
7	Colorado	78
3	#3 UCLA	76
6	USC	74

Semifinals; Friday, March 10
1	#5 Oregon	73
5	California	65
2	#7 Arizona	86
3	#3 UCLA	75

Championship; Saturday, March 11
1	#5 Oregon	80
2	#7 Arizona	83

* denotes overtime period

== Game statistics ==
=== First round ===
Pac-12 Network

March 8
12:10 PM PST

Recap

#8 Arizona State 98, #9 Stanford 88 (OT)
Scoring by half: 1st: 50–42, 2nd: 31–39 Overtime: 17–7
Pts: Obinna Oleka; 27; Rebs: Obinna Oleka; 13; Asts: Tra Holder; 4	Pts: Reid Travis; 23; Rebs: Tied; 9 Asts: Christian Sanders; 8

T-Mobile Arena
Paradise, NV
Attendance: 7,846

Pac-12 Network

March 8
2:40 PM PST

Recap

#5 California 67, #12 Oregon State 62
Scoring by half: 1st: 32–29, 2nd: 35–33
Pts: Jabari Bird; 20; Rebs: Ivan Rabb; 13; Asts: Charlie Moore; 4	Pts: Stephen Thompson Jr.; 25; Rebs: Gligorije Rakocevic; 9 Asts: Jaquori McLaughlin; 6

T-Mobile Arena
Paradise, NV
Attendance: 7,846

Pac-12 Network

March 8
6:05 PM PST

Recap

#7 Colorado 73, #10 Washington State 63
Scoring by half: 1st: 27–41, 2nd: 46–22
Pts: Derrick White; 26; Rebs: Tory Miller; 9 Asts: Derrick White; 5	Pts: Tied; 16; Rebs: Hawkinson; 12; Asts: Hawkinson; 5

T-Mobile Arena
Paradise, NV
Attendance: 9,978

Pac-12 Network

March 8
8:40 PM PST

Recap

#6 USC 78, #11 Washington 73
Scoring by half: 1st: 37–39, 2nd: 41–34
Pts: Chimezie Metu; 24; Rebs: Chimezie Metu; 9 Asts: Jordan McLaughlin; 6	Pts: David Crisp; 22; Rebs: David Crisp; 8 Asts: David Crisp; 7

T-Mobile Arena
Paradise, NV
Attendance: 9,978

=== Quarterfinals ===
Pac-12 Network

March 9
12:10 PM PST

Recap

#1 Oregon 80, #8 Arizona State 57
Scoring by half: 1st: 34–31, 2nd: 46–26
Pts: Dillon Brooks; 22; Rebs: Dylan Ennis; 12; Asts: Dylan Ennis; 5	Pts: Torian Graham; 32; Rebs: Obinna Oleka; 11; Asts: Tied; 4

T-Mobile Arena
Paradise, NV
Attendance: 12,782

Pac-12 Network

March 9
2:40 PM PST

Recap

#4 Utah 75, #5 California 78
Scoring by half: 1st: 30–30, 2nd: 45–48
Pts: Kyle Kuzma; 23; Rebs: Gabe Bealer; 5 Asts: Lorenzo Bonam; 6	Pts: Jabari Bird; 26; Rebs: Kingsley Okoroh; 10; Asts: Tied; 2

T-Mobile Arena
Paradise, NV
Attendance: 12,782

Pac-12 Network

March 9
6:05 PM PST

Recap

#2 Arizona 92, #7 Colorado 78
Scoring by half: 1st: 38–37, 2nd: 54–41
Pts: Lauri Markkanen; 20; Rebs: Dušan Ristić; 8 Asts: Parker Jackson-Cartwright; 7	Pts: Derrick White; 31; Rebs: Tied; 7 Asts: Derrick White; 5

T-Mobile Arena
Paradise, NV
Attendance: 18,153

ESPN

March 9
8:40 PM PST

Recap

#3 UCLA 76, #6 USC 74
Scoring by half: 1st: 38–35, 2nd: 38–39
Pts: Isaac Hamilton; 22; Rebs: Thomas Welsh; 11; Asts: Lonzo Ball; 7	Pts: Jordan McLaughlin; 18; Rebs: Chimezie Metu; 14; Asts: Jordan McLaughlin; 6

T-Mobile Arena
Paradise, NV
Attendance: 18,153

=== Semifinals ===
Pac-12 Network

March 10
6:05 PM PST

Recap

#1 Oregon 73, #5 California 65
Scoring by half: 1st: 36–33, 2nd: 37–32
Pts: Tyler Dorsey; 23; Rebs: Jordan Bell; 15; Asts: Dylan Ennis; 5	Pts: Grant Mullins; 23; Rebs: Kingsley Okoroh; 9 Asts: Grant Mullins; 4

T-Mobile Arena
Paradise, NV
Attendance: 19,224

ESPN

March 10
8:40 PM PST

Recap

#2 Arizona 86, #3 UCLA 75
Scoring by half: 1st: 41–35, 2nd: 45–40
Pts: Lauri Markkanen; 29; Rebs: Lauri Markkanen; 6 Asts: Tied; 4	Pts: Isaac Hamilton; 20; Rebs: Tied; 8 Asts: Lonzo Ball; 6

T-Mobile Arena
Paradise, NV
Attendance: 19,224

=== Championship ===
ESPN

March 11
8:05 PM PST

Recap

#1 Oregon 80, #2 Arizona 83
Scoring by half: 1st: 29–35, 2nd: 51–48
Pts: Dillon Brooks; 25; Rebs: Jordan Bell; 10; Asts: Payton Pritchard; 3	Pts: Allonzo Trier; 23; Rebs: Allonzo Trier; 8 Asts: Kadeem Allen; 4

T-Mobile Arena
Paradise, NV
Attendance: 18,927

== Awards and honors ==
=== Hall of Honor ===
The following former players were inducted into the Pac-12 Conference Men's Basketball Hall of Honor on Friday, March 10, during a ceremony prior to the semifinals of the 2017 Pac-12 men's basketball tournament presented by New York Life.

- Bob Elliott (Arizona)
- Tarence Wheeler (Arizona State)
- Jerome Randle (California)
- Chauncey Billups (Colorado)
- Stu Jackson (Oregon)
- Ray Blume (Oregon State)
- Mike Montgomery (Stanford)
- David Greenwood (UCLA)
- Ralph Vaughn (USC)
- Andre Miller (Utah)
- Quincy Pondexter (Washington)
- Carlos Daniel (Washington State)

=== Team and tournament leaders ===
Team	Points		Rebounds		Assists		Steals		Blocks		Minutes	
Arizona	Allonzo Trier	62	2 tied	16	Parker Jackson-Cartwright	12	2 tied	4	Rawle Alkins	3	Allonzo Trier	106
Arizona State	Torian Graham	49	Obinna Oleka	24	Tra Holder	8	Shannon Evans II	3	Andre Adams	3	2 tied	49
California	Jabari Bird	46	Ivan Rabb	19	Charlie Moore	6	3 tied	3	Kingsley Okoroh	6	Jabari Bird	74
Colorado	Derrick White	57	2 tied	13	Derrick White	10	Derrick White	3	2 tied	3	Derrick White	75
Oregon	Tyler Dorsey	67	Jordan Bell	31	Dylan Ennis	10	Tyler Dorsey	4	Jordan Bell	8	Jordan Bell	102
Oregon State	Stephen Thompson Jr.	25	Gligorije Rakocevic	9	Jaquori McLaughlin	6	3 tied	2	Stephen Thompson Jr.	1	3 tied	37
Stanford	Reid Travis	23	2 tied	9	Christian Sanders	8	Marcus Sheffield	3	Grant Verhoeven	1	Reid Travis	42
UCLA	Isaac Hamilton	42	Thomas Welsh	19	Lonzo Ball	13	Lonzo Ball	3	Thomas Welsh	3	Lonzo Ball	68
USC	Chimezie Metu	32	Chimezie Metu	23	Jordan McLaughlin	12	De'Anthony Melton	6	Chimezie Metu	2	Jordan McLaughlin	72
Utah	Kyle Kuzma	23	Gabe Bealer	5	Lorenzo Bonam	6	Lorenzo Bonam	3	2 tied	1	Lorenzo Bonam	35
Washington	David Crisp	22	David Crisp	8	David Crisp	7	Matisse Thybulle	2	Malik Dime	6	David Crisp	40
Washington State	Ike Iroegbu	16	Josh Hawkinson	12	Josh Hawkinson	5	Ike Iroegbu	2	Conor Clifford	1	2 tied	36

=== All-Tournament Team ===
Name	Pos.	Height	Weight	Year	Team
Dillon Brooks	F	6'7"	225	Jr.	Oregon
Tyler Dorsey	G	6'4"	195	So.	Oregon
Torian Graham	G	6'5"	195	RS Jr.	Arizona State
Lauri Markkanen	F	7'0"	230	Fr.	Arizona
Allonzo Trier	G	6'5"	205	So.	Arizona
Derrick White	G	6'5"	200	RS Sr.	Colorado

=== Most Outstanding Player ===
Name	Pos.	Height	Weight	Year	Team
Allonzo Trier	G	6'5"	205	So.	Arizona

== Tournament notes ==
- Four teams were selected for the 2017 NCAA Division I men's basketball tournament: Arizona, UCLA, Oregon, and USC.
- For the fourth time in conference history, three of the teams had a 3 seed or higher in the NCAA tournament: Arizona earned #2 in the West, UCLA #3 in the South and Oregon #3 in the Midwest. These three teams all reached the Sweet Sixteen of the 2017 NCAA tournament. Oregon reached the Final Four, and was eliminated in the semifinals by eventual National Champion North Carolina.
- Three Pac-12 teams were selected to participate in the 2017 National Invitation Tournament: Utah, California, and Colorado.

== See also ==
- 2017 Pac-12 Conference women's basketball tournament
