= Romello White =

American basketball player (born 1998)

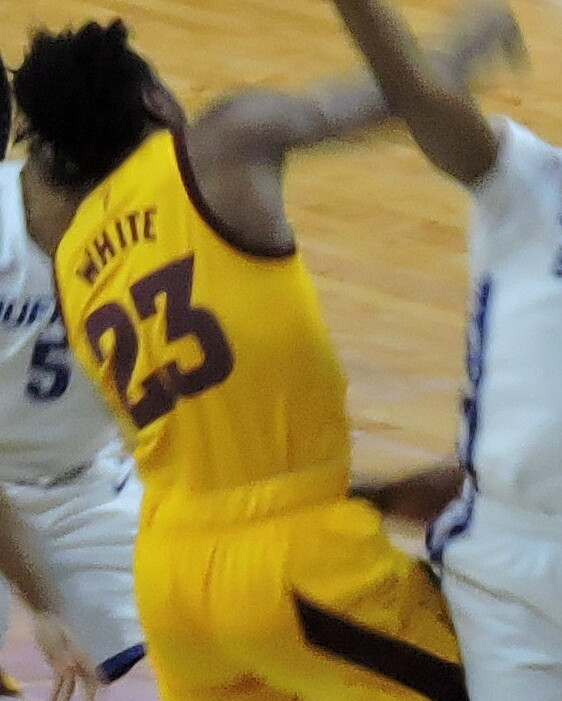
- White in 2019

Köping Stars
- Position: Center / Power forward
- League: Basketligan

Personal information
- Born: May 9, 1998 (age 28) Atlanta, Georgia, U.S.
- Listed height: 6 ft 8 in (2.03 m)
- Listed weight: 235 lb (107 kg)

Career information
- High school: Peachtree Ridge (Suwanee, Georgia); IMG Academy (Bradenton, Florida); Wheeler (Marietta, Georgia)
- College: Arizona State (2017–2020); Ole Miss (2020–2021)
- NBA draft: 2021: undrafted
- Playing career: 2021–present

Career history
- 2021: Hapoel Eilat
- 2022: Keravnos
- 2022–2023: Ironi Nahariya
- 2023–2025: Karditsa
- 2025–present: Köping Stars

Career highlights
- Israeli Leumit Cup winner (2022); Cypriot League champion (2022)

Romello Da'Quan White (born May 9, 1998) is an American professional basketball player for Köping Stars of the Basketligan. He played college basketball for the Arizona State Sun Devils and the Ole Miss Rebels.

== High school career ==
White attended Wheeler High School. He developed a relationship with former NBA player Jerry Stackhouse in high school, and Stackhouse became his mentor. White originally signed with Georgia Tech, but reconsidered after coach Brian Gregory was fired. He committed to Arizona State because he had a relationship with former assistant coach Anthony Coleman.

== College career ==
White redshirted his true freshman season to improve his academics. He became a starter as a redshirt freshman and averaged 10.5 points and 7.1 rebounds per game. White averaged 8.7 points and 5.2 rebounds per game as a sophomore. He worked on his conditioning and nutrition in the offseason and lost 10 pounds. As a junior, White averaged 10.2 points and 8.8 rebounds per game, and posted eight double-doubles.

Following the season, he transferred to Ole Miss. On February 6, 2021, he scored a career-high 30 points and had 10 rebounds and four blocks in an 86–84 win against Auburn. During his redshirt senior season, White averaged 11.4 points and 6 rebounds per game, led the team with 36 blocks, and set the Ole Miss single-season record with a 64.9 percent shooting percentage.

== Professional career ==
On July 11, 2021, White signed his first professional contract with Hapoel Eilat of the Israeli Basketball Premier League. He averaged 10.7 points and 4.0 rebounds per game, but left the team in December 2021.

On March 6, 2022, White signed with Keravnos Strovolou of the Cyprus Basketball Division A.

White spent the 2022–2023 season with Israeli club Ironi Nahariya.

On July 31, 2023, White signed with Greek club Karditsa. After suffering a torn patella in the end of the season, White had his rehabilitation period with the team and re-signed with Karditsa for the 2025-26 season. On November 30, 2025, White amicably parted ways with the Greek club.

== Career statistics ==
Legend
GP	Games played	GS	Games started	MPG	Minutes per game
FG%	Field goal percentage	3P%	3-point field goal percentage	FT%	Free throw percentage
RPG	Rebounds per game	APG	Assists per game	SPG	Steals per game
BPG	Blocks per game	PPG	Points per game	**Bold**	Career high

=== College ===
Year	Team	GP	GS	MPG	FG%	3P%	FT%	RPG	APG	SPG	BPG	PPG
2016–17	Arizona State	Redshirt										
2017–18	Arizona State	31	29	24.3	**.652**	–	.552	7.1	.4	.3	.7	10.5
2018–19	Arizona State	**34**	**32**	25.0	.598	–	.579	5.2	.3	.4	.7	8.7
2019–20	Arizona State	30	29	**28.5**	.569	–	.683	**8.8**	**1.0**	**.5**	1.2	10.2
2020–21	Ole Miss	28	25	27.8	.649	.000	**.710**	6.0	**1.0**	**.5**	**1.3**	**11.4**
Career		123	115	26.3	.616	.000	.624	6.7	.7	.4	1.0	10.1
