= 2016–17 California Golden Bears men's basketball team =

American college basketball season

2016–17 California Golden Bears men's basketball

NIT, First round
- Conference: Pac-12 Conference
- Record: 21–13 (10–8 Pac–12)
- Head coach: Cuonzo Martin (3rd season)
- Assistant coaches: Tracy Webster; Wyking Jones; Tim O'Tool
- Home arena: Haas Pavilion

2016–17 Pac-12 Conference men's basketball standings
| | Conf. | | | | Overall |
| Team | W | | L | PCT | W | | L | PCT |
|---|---|---|---|---|---|---|---|---|
| No. 9 Oregon | 16 | – | 2 | .889 | 33 | – | 6 | .846 |
| No. 4 Arizona † | 16 | – | 2 | .889 | 32 | – | 5 | .865 |
| No. 8 UCLA | 15 | – | 3 | .833 | 31 | – | 5 | .861 |
| Utah | 11 | – | 7 | .611 | 20 | – | 12 | .625 |
| California | 10 | – | 8 | .556 | 21 | – | 13 | .618 |
| USC | 10 | – | 8 | .556 | 26 | – | 10 | .722 |
| Colorado | 8 | – | 10 | .444 | 19 | – | 15 | .559 |
| Arizona State | 7 | – | 11 | .389 | 15 | – | 18 | .455 |
| Stanford | 6 | – | 12 | .333 | 14 | – | 17 | .452 |
| Washington State | 6 | – | 12 | .333 | 13 | – | 18 | .419 |
| Washington | 2 | – | 16 | .111 | 9 | – | 22 | .290 |
| Oregon State | 1 | – | 17 | .056 | 5 | – | 27 | .156 |
† Pac-12 Tournament winner Rankings from AP poll

The 2016–17 California Golden Bears men's basketball team represented the University of California, Berkeley in the 2016–17 NCAA Division I men's basketball season. This was Cuonzo Martin's third year as head coach at California. The Golden Bears played their home games at Haas Pavilion as members of the Pac-12 Conference. They finished the season 21–13, 10–8 in Pac-12 play to finish in a tie for fifth place. They defeated Oregon State and Utah in Pac-12 tournament to advance to the semifinals, where they lost to Oregon. They were one of the last four teams not selected for the NCAA tournament and thus received a No. 1 seed in the National Invitation Tournament, where they lost in the first round to Cal State Bakersfield.

On March 15, head coach Cuonzo Martin resigned to become the head coach at Missouri. He finished at Cal with a three-year record of 62–39. On March 24, Cal promoted assistant coach Wyking Jones to head coach.

== Previous season ==
The Golden Bears finished the 2015–16 season with a record of 23–11, 12–6 in Pac-12 play to finish in a tie for third place. They defeated Oregon State in the quarterfinals of the Pac-12 tournament to advance to the semifinals, where they lost to Utah. They received an at-large bid to the NCAA tournament, where they lost in the first round to Hawaii.

== Off-season ==
=== Departures ===
| Name | Pos. | Height | Weight | Year | Hometown | Notes |
|---|---|---|---|---|---|---|
| Brenden Glapion | G | 6'3" | 195 | RS Sr. | San Francisco, CA | Graduated |
| Nick Kerr | G | 6'3" | 180 | RS Sr. | Rancho Santa Fe, CA | Graduated |
| Jordan Mathews | G | 6'4" | 203 | Jr. | San Francisco, CA | Graduated; transferred to Gonzaga |
| Tyrone Wallace | G | 6'5" | 205 | Sr. | Bakersfield, CA | Graduated; declared for 2016 NBA draft |
| Jaylen Brown | F | 6'7" | 225 | Fr. | Marietta, GA | Declared for 2016 NBA draft |

=== Incoming transfers ===
| Name | Pos. | Height | Weight | Year | Hometown | Notes |
|---|---|---|---|---|---|---|
| Dontae Coleman | G | 6'3" | 188 | So. | Augusta, GA | Junior college transfer from Lawson State Community College |
| Grant Mullins | G | 6'3" | 175 | Sr. | Burlington, ON | Graduate transfer from Columbia University |
| Marcus Lee | F | 6'9" | 224 | Sr. | Antioch, CA | Transfer from University of Kentucky |

=== 2016 recruiting class ===
College recruiting
| Name | Hometown | School | Height | Weight | Commit date |
|---|---|---|---|---|---|
| Charlie Moore; PG | Chicago, IL | Morgan Park HS | 5 ft 11 in (1.80 m) | 160 lb (73 kg) | May 18, 2016 |
| Charlie Moore; PG | Recruit ratings: Scout: Rivals: 247Sports: ESPN: | | | | |
Overall recruit ranking:
Note: In many cases, Scout, Rivals, 247Sports, On3, and ESPN may conflict in their listings of height and weight.; In these cases, the average was taken. ESPN grades are on a 100-point scale.; Sources:

College recruiting (2017)
| Name | Hometown | School | Height | Weight | Commit date |
|---|---|---|---|---|---|
| Jemarl Baker; SG | Los Angeles, CA | Theodore Roosevelt HS | 6 ft 2.75 in (1.90 m) | 174 lb (79 kg) | Dec 31, 2015 |
| Jemarl Baker; SG | Recruit ratings: Scout: Rivals: 247Sports: ESPN: (85) | | | | |
| Juhwan Harris-Dyson; SG | Northridge, CA | Heritage Christian HS | 6 ft 4 in (1.93 m) | 188 lb (85 kg) | Jul 13, 2016 |
| Juhwan Harris-Dyson; SG | Recruit ratings: Scout: Rivals: 247Sports: ESPN: (80) | | | | |
| Trevin Knell; SG | Woods Cross, UT | Woods Cross HS | 6 ft 5 in (1.96 m) | 180 lb (82 kg) | Oct 4, 2016 |
| Trevin Knell; SG | Recruit ratings: Scout: Rivals: 247Sports: ESPN: (77) | | | | |
Overall recruit ranking:
Note: In many cases, Scout, Rivals, 247Sports, On3, and ESPN may conflict in their listings of height and weight.; In these cases, the average was taken. ESPN grades are on a 100-point scale.; Sources:

== Roster ==
2016–17 California Golden Bears men's basketball team
Players
Coaches

| Pos. | # | Name | Height | Weight | Year | Previous school | Hometown |
|---|---|---|---|---|---|---|---|
| F | 1 | Ivan Rabb | 6 ft 11 in (2.11 m) | 220 lb (100 kg) | So | Bishop O'Dowd HS | Oakland, California |
| G | 2 | Sam Singer | 6 ft 4 in (1.93 m) | 205 lb (93 kg) | Sr | Ransom Everglades HS | Miami, Florida |
| G | 3 | Grant Mullins | 6 ft 3 in (1.91 m) | 175 lb (79 kg) | RS Sr | Columbia | Burlington, Ontario |
| G | 10 | Brandon Chauca | 5 ft 8 in (1.73 m) | 160 lb (73 kg) | Jr | 22 Feet Academy | Alexandria, Virginia |
| F | 12 | Roger Moute a Bidias | 6 ft 6 in (1.98 m) | 210 lb (95 kg) | Sr | Notre Dame Prep | Yaoundé, Cameroon |
| G | 13 | Charlie Moore | 5 ft 11 in (1.8 m) | 170 lb (77 kg) | Fr | Morgan Park HS | Chicago, Illinois |
| G | 14 | Don Coleman | 6 ft 2 in (1.88 m) | 188 lb (85 kg) | So | Lawson State C.C. | Augusta, Georgia |
| F | 15 | Marcus Lee (redshirt) | 6 ft 10 in (2.08 m) | 224 lb (102 kg) | Sr | Kentucky | Antioch, California |
| G | 20 | Derek King (W) | 6 ft 3 in (1.91 m) | 200 lb (91 kg) | Jr | Santa Teresa HS/Foothill College | Shanghai, China |
| G | 21 | Nick Hamilton (W) | 6 ft 4 in (1.93 m) | 192 lb (87 kg) | Jr | Westchester HS | Inglewood, California |
| C | 22 | Kingsley Okoroh | 7 ft 0 in (2.13 m) | 252 lb (114 kg) | Jr | Westwind Prep | Derby, England |
| G | 23 | Jabari Bird | 6 ft 6 in (1.98 m) | 198 lb (90 kg) | Sr | Salesian HS | Vallejo, California |
| F | 25 | Roman Davis | 6 ft 7 in (2.01 m) | 190 lb (86 kg) | RS Fr | Windward HS | Carson, California |
| G | 30 | Koko Kurdoghlian (W) | 6 ft 2 in (1.88 m) | 182 lb (83 kg) | Fr | La Cañada HS | La Cañada, California |
| G | 31 | Stephen Domingo | 6 ft 7 in (2.01 m) | 215 lb (98 kg) | RS Sr | Georgetown | San Francisco, California |
| F | 42 | Cole Welle (W) | 6 ft 7 in (2.01 m) | 228 lb (103 kg) | Jr | Aptos HS | Aptos, California |
| C | 44 | Kameron Rooks | 7 ft 1 in (2.16 m) | 265 lb (120 kg) | RS Jr | Mission Hills HS | San Marcos, California |

Head coach

- Cuonzo Martin

Assistant coach(es)

- Tracy Webster
- Wyking Jones
- Tim O'Toole

Legend

- (C) Team captain
- (S) Suspended
- (I) Ineligible
- (W) Walk-on
- Injured
- Current redshirt

Roster
Last update: October 12, 2016

== Schedule and results ==
| Date time, TV | Rank^{#} | Opponent^{#} | Result | Record | High points | High rebounds | High assists | Site (attendance) city, state |
Exhibition
| Nov. 3*; 7:00 pm | | California Baptist | W 81–73 | – | 16 – Tied | 8 – Rooks | 4 – Singer | Haas Pavilion (2,828); Berkeley, CA |
Non-conference regular season
| Nov. 11*; 7:00 pm, P12N | | South Dakota State | W 82–58 | 1–0 | 14 – Tied | 7 – Tied | 5 – Tied | Haas Pavilion (7,782); Berkeley, CA |
| Nov. 16*; 8:00 pm, P12N | No. 25 | UC Irvine | W 75–65 ^{OT} | 2–0 | 38 – Moore | 9 – Domingo | 5 – Singer | Haas Pavilion (8,104); Berkeley, CA |
| Nov. 21*; 8:00 pm, P12N | | vs. San Diego State; Sacramento Showcase | L 65–77 | 2–1 | 19 – Rabb | 11 – Rabb | 2 – Tied | Golden 1 Center (10,104); Sacramento, CA |
| Nov. 25*; 8:00 pm, P12N | | Wyoming | W 71–61 | 3–1 | 18 – Moore | 10 – Rabb | 6 – Moore | Haas Pavilion (8,355); Berkeley, CA |
| Nov. 27*; 5:00 pm, P12N | | Southeastern Louisiana; California Bears Classic | W 67–55 | 4–1 | 22 – Moore | 10 – Rabb | 4 – Moore | Haas Pavilion (8,387); Berkeley, CA |
| Nov. 30*; 6:00 pm, P12N | | Louisiana Tech; California Bears Classic | W 68–59 ^{OT} | 5–1 | 25 – Rabb | 13 – Rabb | 4 – Tied | Haas Pavilion (8,129); Berkeley, CA |
| Dec. 3*; 1:00 pm, P12N | | Alcorn State; California Bears Classic | W 83–59 | 6–1 | 26 – Rabb | 9 – Okoroh | 4 – Moore | Haas Pavilion (8,257); Berkeley, CA |
| Dec. 6*; 4:00 pm, FS1 | | vs. Princeton; Pearl Harbor Basketball Invitational | W 62–51 | 7–1 | 15 – Moore | 11 – Rabb | 3 – Singer | Bloch Arena (4,024); Honolulu, HI |
| Dec. 7*; 4:00 pm, FS1 | | vs. Seton Hall; Pearl Harbor Basketball Invitational | L 57–60 | 7–2 | 22 – Bird | 9 – Bird | 3 – Moore | Bloch Arena (4,024); Honolulu, HI |
| Dec. 10*; 7:30 pm, P12N | | UC Davis | W 86–61 | 8–2 | 22 – Moore | 5 – Singer | 6 – Singer | Haas Pavilion (8,664); Berkeley, CA |
| Dec. 17*; 5:00 pm, P12N | | Cal Poly | W 81–55 | 9–2 | 25 – Bird | 11 – Okoroh | 5 – Tied | Haas Pavilion (9,698); Berkeley, CA |
| Dec. 21*; 7:00 pm, ESPN2 | | No. 12 Virginia | L 52–56 | 9–3 | 15 – Bird | 12 – Rabb | 4 – Moore | Haas Pavilion (11,092); Berkeley, CA |
Pac-12 regular season
| Dec. 30; 8:00 pm, ESPN2 | | No. 18 Arizona | L 62–67 | 9–4 (0–1) | 16 – Rabb | 16 – Rabb | 4 – Moore | Haas Pavilion (10,844); Berkeley, CA |
| Jan. 1; 7:00 pm, P12N | | Arizona State | W 81–65 | 10–4 (1–1) | 20 – Tied | 15 – Rabb | 6 – Moore | Haas Pavilion (8,776); Berkeley, CA |
| Jan. 5; 6:00 pm, ESPN | | at No. 4 UCLA | L 71–81 | 10–5 (1–2) | 19 – Mullins | 20 – Rabb | 2 – Tied | Pauley Pavilion (13,659); Los Angeles, CA |
| Jan. 8; 7:00 pm, ESPNU | | at No. 25 USC | W 74–73 | 11–5 (2–2) | 17 – Rabb | 8 – Rabb | 5 – Mullins | Galen Center (5,528); Los Angeles, CA |
| Jan. 12; 6:00 pm, FS1 | | Washington | W 69–59 | 12–5 (3–2) | 20 – Rabb | 14 – Rabb | 2 – Bird | Haas Pavilion (9,093); Berkeley, CA |
| Jan. 14; 1:00 pm, P12N | | Washington State | W 58–54 | 13–5 (4–2) | 14 – Rabb | 12 – Rabb | 3 – Rabb | Haas Pavilion (9,238); Berkeley, CA |
| Jan. 19; 6:00 pm, ESPN2 | | at No. 11 Oregon | L 63–86 | 13–6 (4–3) | 21 – Bird | 6 – Moore | 5 – Moore | Matthew Knight Arena (10,010); Eugene, OR |
| Jan. 21; 7:30 pm, P12N | | at Oregon State | W 69–58 | 14–6 (5–3) | 18 – Rabb | 8 – Tied | 4 – Moore | Gill Coliseum (4,945); Corvallis, OR |
| Jan. 29; 5:30 pm, ESPNU | | Stanford | W 66–55 | 15–6 (6–3) | 25 – Rabb | 13 – Rabb | 8 – Moore | Haas Pavilion (11,877); Berkeley, CA |
| Feb. 2; 6:00 pm, P12N | | Utah | W 77–75 ^{2OT} | 16–6 (7–3) | 26 – Bird | 14 – Rabb | 4 – Moore | Haas Pavilion (9,246); Berkeley, CA |
| Feb. 5; 1:30 pm, ESPNU | | Colorado | W 77–66 | 17–6 (8–3) | 17 – Moore | 11 – Rabb | 8 – Moore | Haas Pavilion (9,719); Berkeley, CA |
| Feb. 8; 8:00 pm, ESPNU | | at Arizona State | W 68–43 | 18–6 (9–3) | 18 – Mullins | 11 – Rabb | 3 – Tied | Wells Fargo Arena (5,107); Tempe, AZ |
| Feb. 11; 7:00 pm, ESPN2 | | at No. 9 Arizona | L 57–62 | 18–7 (9–4) | 19 – Bird | 6 – Rooks | 4 – Singer | McKale Center (14,644); Tucson, AZ |
| Feb. 17; 7:00 pm, FS1 | | at Stanford | L 68–73 | 18–8 (9–5) | 23 – Bird | 13 – Rabb | 6 – Moore | Maples Pavilion (4,870); Stanford, CA |
| Feb. 22; 6:00 pm, ESPN2 | | No. 6 Oregon | L 65–68 | 18–9 (9–6) | 20 – Bird | 12 – Rabb | 4 – Tied | Haas Pavilion (10,759); Berkeley, CA |
| Feb. 24; 7:00 pm, FS1 | | Oregon State | W 76–46 | 19–9 (10–6) | 16 – Rabb | 9 – Rabb | 5 – Moore | Haas Pavilion (9,500); Berkeley, CA |
| Mar. 2; 8:00 pm, ESPNU | | at Utah | L 44–74 | 19–10 (10–7) | 11 – Mullins | 8 – Rabb | 1 – Tied | Jon M. Huntsman Center (12,876); Salt Lake City, UT |
| Mar. 4; 11:00 am, P12N | | at Colorado | L 46–54 | 19–11 (10–8) | 11 – Tied | 13 – Rabb | 2 – Singer | Coors Events Center (8,392); Boulder, CO |
Pac-12 tournament
| Mar 8, 2017; 2:30 pm, P12N | (5) | vs. (12) Oregon State; First Round | W 67–62 | 20–11 | 20 – Bird | 13 – Rabb | 4 – Moore | T-Mobile Arena (7,846); Paradise, NV |
| Mar 9, 2017; 2:30 pm, P12N | (5) | vs. (4) Utah; Quarterfinals | W 78–75 | 21–11 | 26 – Bird | 10 – Okoroh | 2 – Tied | T-Mobile Arena (12,782); Paradise, NV |
| Mar 10, 2017; 6:00 pm, P12N | (5) | vs. (1) No. 5 Oregon; Semifinals | L 65–73 | 21–12 | 23 – Mullins | 9 – Okoroh | 4 – Mullins | T-Mobile Arena (19,224); Paradise, NV |
NIT
| Mar. 14, 2017*; 8:15 pm, ESPN2 | (1) | (8) Cal State Bakersfield; First Round – California Bracket | L 66–73 | 21–13 | 26 – Coleman | 7 – Welle | 4 – Mullins | Haas Pavilion (1,778); Berkeley, CA |
*Non-conference game. ^{#}Rankings from AP Poll. (#) Tournament seedings in parentheses. All times are in Pacific Time.

== Ranking movement ==
Ranking movement Legend: ██ Increase in ranking. ██ Decrease in ranking. RV=Received votes. NV=Received no votes.
| Poll | Pre | Wk 2 | Wk 3 | Wk 4 | Wk 5 | Wk 6 | Wk 7 | Wk 8 | Wk 9 | Wk 10 | Wk 11 | Wk 12 | Wk 13 | Wk 14 | Wk 15 | Wk 16 | Wk 17 | Wk 18 | Post | Final |
|---|---|---|---|---|---|---|---|---|---|---|---|---|---|---|---|---|---|---|---|---|
| AP | RV | 25 | RV | RV | RV | NV | NV | NV | NV | NV | NV | NV | NV | RV | NV | NV | NV | | | N/A* |
| Coaches | RV | RV | RV | RV | RV | RV | RV | RV | RV | RV | RV | NV | NV | NV | NV | RV | RV | | | |

== Notes ==
- March 24, 2017 – Wyking Jones was named the team's head coach.
