= 2016–17 Stanford Cardinal men's basketball team =

American college basketball season

2016–17 Stanford Cardinal men's basketball
- Conference: Pac-12 Conference
- Record: 14–17 (6–12 Pac-12)
- Head coach: Jerod Haase (1st season)
- Assistant coaches: Jeff Wulbrun; Adam Cohen; Jesse Pruitt
- Home arena: Maples Pavilion

2016–17 Pac-12 Conference men's basketball standings
	Conf.				Overall
Team	W		L	PCT	W		L	PCT
No. 9 Oregon	16	–	2	.889	33	–	6	.846
No. 4 Arizona †	16	–	2	.889	32	–	5	.865
No. 8 UCLA	15	–	3	.833	31	–	5	.861
Utah	11	–	7	.611	20	–	12	.625
California	10	–	8	.556	21	–	13	.618
USC	10	–	8	.556	26	–	10	.722
Colorado	8	–	10	.444	19	–	15	.559
Arizona State	7	–	11	.389	15	–	18	.455
Stanford	6	–	12	.333	14	–	17	.452
Washington State	6	–	12	.333	13	–	18	.419
Washington	2	–	16	.111	9	–	22	.290
Oregon State	1	–	17	.056	5	–	27	.156
† Pac-12 Tournament winner Rankings from AP poll

The 2016–17 Stanford Cardinal men's basketball team represented Stanford University during the 2016–17 NCAA Division I men's basketball season. The Cardinal were led by first-year head coach Jerod Haase. They played their home games at Maples Pavilion as members of the Pac-12 Conference. They finished the season 14–17, 6–12 in Pac-12 play to finish in a tie for ninth place. They lost in the first round of the Pac-12 tournament to Arizona State.

== Previous season ==
The Cardinal finished the 2015–16 season 15–15, 8–10 in Pac-12 play to finish in ninth place. They lost in the first round of the Pac-12 tournament to Washington. Stanford failed to receive an invite to the NCAA tournament and declined to participate in any other postseason tournament, marking the first time since 2011 that they would not participate in a postseason tournament.

On March 14, 2016, head coach Johnny Dawkins was fired after eight seasons. On March 25, the school hired Jerod Haase as head coach.

== Offseason ==
=== Departures ===
Name	Pos.	Height	Weight	Year	Hometown	Notes
Ian Proulx	G	6'1"	185	Sr.	Atherton, California	Graduated
Rosco Allen	SF	6'9"	220	RS Jr.	Budapest, Hungary	Declared for 2016 NBA draft

=== 2016 recruiting class ===
College recruiting information
Name	Hometown	School	Height	Weight	Commit date
Trevor Stanback; C	Pasadena, CA	Maranatha High School	6 ft 10 in (2.08 m)	215 lb (98 kg)	Nov 2, 2015
Trevor Stanback; C	Recruit ratings: Scout: Rivals: 247Sports: ESPN:				
Kodye Pugh; SF	Baltimore, MD	Blair Academy	6 ft 7 in (2.01 m)	190 lb (86 kg)	Mar 7, 2016
Kodye Pugh; SF	Recruit ratings: Scout: Rivals: 247Sports: ESPN:				
Overall recruit ranking:
Note: In many cases, Scout, Rivals, 247Sports, On3, and ESPN may conflict in their listings of height and weight.; In these cases, the average was taken. ESPN grades are on a 100-point scale.; Sources: "2016 Stanford Basketball Commitment List". Rivals.; "2016 Stanford Cardinal Player Commits". ESPN.; "2016 Team Ranking". Rivals.

College recruiting information (2017)
Name	Hometown	School	Height	Weight	Commit date
Kezie Okpala; SF	Placentia, CA	Esperanza High School	6 ft 6 in (1.98 m)	180 lb (82 kg)	Aug 7, 2016
Kezie Okpala; SF	Recruit ratings: Scout: Rivals: 247Sports: ESPN: (89)				
Overall recruit ranking:
Note: In many cases, Scout, Rivals, 247Sports, On3, and ESPN may conflict in their listings of height and weight.; In these cases, the average was taken. ESPN grades are on a 100-point scale.; Sources: "2017 Stanford Basketball Commitment List". Rivals.; "2017 Stanford Cardinal Player Commits". ESPN.; "2017 Team Ranking". Rivals.

== Roster ==
2016–17 Stanford Cardinal men's basketball team
Players
Coaches

Pos.	#	Name	Height	Weight	Year	Previous school	Hometown
G	1	Christian Sanders	6 ft 4 in (1.93 m)	192 lb (87 kg)	RS Sr	St. Thomas HS	Houston, Texas
G	2	Robert Cartwright	6 ft 2 in (1.88 m)	180 lb (82 kg)	RS So	Flintridge Prep	Pasadena, California
G	3	Malcolm Allen	6 ft 1 in (1.85 m)	180 lb (82 kg)	RS Jr	Centennial HS	Las Vegas, Nevada
F	5	Kodye Pugh	6 ft 8 in (2.03 m)	205 lb (93 kg)	Fr	Blair Academy	Baltimore, Maryland
F	10	Michael Humphrey	6 ft 9 in (2.06 m)	245 lb (111 kg)	Jr	Sunnyslope HS	Phoenix, Arizona
G/F	11	Dorian Pickens	6 ft 5 in (1.96 m)	215 lb (98 kg)	Jr	Pinnacle HS	Phoenix, Arizona
G/F	14	Marcus Sheffield	6 ft 5 in (1.96 m)	180 lb (82 kg)	So	Chattahoochee HS	Alpharetta, Georgia
G	15	Marcus Allen	6 ft 3 in (1.91 m)	190 lb (86 kg)	Sr	Centennial HS	Las Vegas, Nevada
C	20	Josh Sharma	7 ft 0 in (2.13 m)	220 lb (100 kg)	So	Northfield Mount Hermon	Lexington, Massachusetts
F	21	Cameron Walker	6 ft 7 in (2.01 m)	200 lb (91 kg)	So	Righetti HS	Santa Maria, California
F	22	Reid Travis	6 ft 8 in (2.03 m)	245 lb (111 kg)	RS So	DeLaSalle HS	Minneapolis, Minnesota
C	30	Grant Verhoeven	6 ft 9 in (2.06 m)	250 lb (113 kg)	RS Sr	Central Valley Christian HS	Hanford, California
F	33	Trevor Stanback	6 ft 11 in (2.11 m)	220 lb (100 kg)	Fr	Maranatha HS	Pasadena, California

Head coach

- Jerod Haase (Kansas)

Assistant coach(es)

- Jeff Wulbrun (Cal State Fullerton)
- Adam Cohen (Arizona)
- Jesse Pruitt (UC Davis)

Legend

- (C) Team captain
- (S) Suspended
- (I) Ineligible
- (W) Walk-on
- Injured
- Current redshirt

Roster
Last update: July 17, 2016

== Schedule and results ==
Date time, TV	Rank^{#}	Opponent^{#}	Result	Record	Site (attendance) city, state
Non-conference regular season
Nov. 11, 2016*; 8:00 PM, ESPN2		vs. Harvard; Pac-12 China Game	W 80–70	1–0	Mercedes-Benz Arena (7,196); Shanghai, CN
Nov. 15, 2016*; 7:00 PM, P12N		Cal State Northridge	W 96–69	2–0	Maples Pavilion (2,801); Stanford, CA
Nov. 17, 2016*; 7:00 PM, P12N		Weber State	W 67–49	3–0	Maples Pavilion (1,232); Stanford, CA
Nov. 20, 2016*; 3:00 PM, P12N		Colorado State	W 56–49	4–0	Maples Pavilion (4,661); Stanford, CA
Nov. 24, 2016*; 11:30 AM, ESPN2		vs. Miami (FL); AdvoCare Invitational quarterfinal	L 53–67	4–1	HP Field House (2,436); Orlando, FL
Nov. 25, 2016*; 10:00 AM, ESPN3		vs. Indiana State; AdvoCare Invitational 2nd round consolation	W 65–62	5–1	HP Field House (1,876); Orlando, FL
Nov. 27, 2016*; 4:00 PM, ESPNU		vs. Seton Hall; AdvoCare Invitational 5th place game	W 66–52	6–1	HP Field House (1,216); Orlando, FL
Nov. 30, 2016*; 8:00 PM, P12N		No. 12 Saint Mary's	L 51–66	6–2	Maples Pavilion (4,079); Stanford, CA
Dec. 3, 2016*; 12:30 PM, ESPN		at No. 4 Kansas	L 74–89	6–3	Allen Fieldhouse (16,300); Lawrence, KS
Dec. 16, 2016*; 6:00 PM, P12N		Cal State East Bay	W 79–55	7–3	Maples Pavilion (3,186); Stanford, CA
Dec. 19, 2016*; 6:00 PM, ESPN2		at SMU	L 49–72	7–4	Moody Coliseum (6,923); Dallas, TX
Dec. 22, 2016*; 7:30 PM, P12N		Idaho	W 86–80	8–4	Maples Pavilion (3,287); Stanford, CA
Pac-12 regular season
Dec. 30, 2016; 6:00 PM, P12N		Arizona State	L 93–98	8–5 (0–1)	Maples Pavilion (3,595); Stanford, CA
Jan. 1, 2017; 5:00 PM, P12N		No. 18 Arizona	L 52–91	8–6 (0–2)	Maples Pavilion (4,396); Stanford, CA
Jan. 5, 2017; 8:00 PM, P12N		at No. 25 USC	L 56–72	8–7 (0–3)	Galen Center (4,092); Los Angeles, CA
Jan. 8, 2017; 5:00 PM, FS1		at No. 4 UCLA	L 75–89	8–8 (0–4)	Pauley Pavilion (13,659); Los Angeles, CA
Jan. 12, 2017; 8:00 PM, P12N		Washington State	W 84–54	9–8 (1–4)	Maples Pavilion (3,491); Stanford, CA
Jan. 14, 2017; 5:00 PM, P12N		Washington	W 76–69	10–8 (2–4)	Maples Pavilion (3,673); Stanford, CA
Jan. 19, 2017; 8:00 PM, P12N		at Oregon State	W 62–46	11–8 (3–4)	Gill Coliseum (4,585); Corvallis, OR
Jan. 21, 2017; 3:00 PM, P12N		at No. 11 Oregon	L 52–69	11–9 (3–5)	Matthew Knight Arena (12,364); Eugene, OR
Jan. 29, 2017; 5:30 PM, ESPNU		at California	L 55–66	11–10 (3–6)	Haas Pavilion (11,877); Berkeley, CA
Feb. 2, 2017; 8:00 PM, P12N		Colorado	L 74–81	11–11 (3–7)	Maples Pavilion (3,849); Stanford, CA
Feb. 4, 2017; 1:30 PM, FS1		Utah	W 81–75	12–11 (4–7)	Maples Pavilion (4,447); Stanford, CA
Feb. 8, 2017; 8:00 PM, FS1		at No. 9 Arizona	L 67–74	12–12 (4–8)	McKale Center (14,644); Tucson, AZ
Feb. 11, 2017; 5:00 PM, P12N		at Arizona State	L 69–75	12–13 (4–9)	Wells Fargo Arena (8,206); Tempe, AZ
Feb. 17, 2017; 7:00 PM, FS1		California	W 73–68	13–13 (5–9)	Maples Pavilion (4,870); Stanford, CA
Feb. 22, 2017; 8:00 PM, ESPNU		Oregon State	W 79–66	14–13 (6–9)	Maples Pavilion (3,007); Stanford, CA
Feb. 25, 2017; 1:00 PM, P12N		No. 6 Oregon	L 73–75	14–14 (6–10)	Maples Pavilion (5,509); Stanford, CA
Mar. 2, 2017; 6:00 PM, ESPN2		at Colorado	L 72–91	14–15 (6–11)	Coors Events Center (8,008); Boulder, CO
Mar. 4, 2017; 1:00 PM, P12N		at Utah	L 59–67	14–16 (6–12)	Jon M. Huntsman Center (12,370); Salt Lake City, UT
Pac-12 tournament
Mar. 8, 2017; 12:00 PM, P12N	(9)	vs. (8) Arizona State; First round	L 88–98 ^{OT}	14–17	T-Mobile Arena (7,846); Paradise, NV
*Non-conference game. ^{#}Rankings from AP Poll. (#) Tournament seedings in parentheses. All times are in Pacific Time.
