= Isaiah Eisendorf =

American-Israeli basketball player (born 1996)

Isaiah Eisendorf אייזאה אייזנדורף
No. 25 – Maccabi Ramat Gan
- Position: Forward
- League: Israeli Basketball Premier League

Personal information
- Born: July 9, 1996 (age 30) Los Angeles, California, U.S.
- Listed height: 6 ft 6 in (1.98 m)
- Listed weight: 220 lb (100 kg)

Career information
- High school: Springbrook (Silver Spring, Maryland)
- College: Gannon (2014–2016); Le Moyne (2016–2018)
- NBA draft: 2018: undrafted
- Playing career: 2019–present

Career history
- 2019–2020: Hapoel Tel Aviv
- 2020–2021: Bnei Herzliya
- →2021: Hapoel Galil Elyon
- 2021–2022: Hapoel Galil Elyon
- 2022–2023: Ironi Nahariya
- 2024: Hong Kong Eastern
- 2025: Hapoel Eilat
- 2025–present: Maccabi Ramat Gan

Career highlights
- Second-team All-Northeast-10 (2018); Northeast-10 tournament MVP (2018)

Isaiah Eisendorf (Hebrew: אייזאה אייזנדורף; born July 9, 1996) is an American-Israeli professional basketball player for Maccabi Ramat Gan of the Israeli Basketball Premier League. He previously played college basketball for the Gannon Golden Knights and Le Moyne Dolphins. Eisendorf plays the forward position.

== Early life ==
Eisendorf is from Los Angeles, California, and is Jewish. He is 6 ft 6 in (198 cm) tall, and weighs 220 pounds (100 kg). He is the stepson of sportswriter Norman Chad.

He played high school basketball for Springbrook High School ('14) in Silver Spring, Maryland. As a senior Eisendorf was named all-county second-team and All-Met honorable-mention, as well as a Montgomery County All-Star. He also played high school football, as a wide receiver and defensive end.

== College ==
Eisendorf attended Gannon University. He first played college basketball for the Gannon Golden Knights in 2014–16.

He then transferred and played college basketball at Le Moyne College ('18) for the Le Moyne Dolphins from 2016 to 2018. In 2018 Eisendorf was Northeast-10 Conference All-Tournament Team, Northeast-10 Tournament MVP, Northeast-10 All-Conference Second Team, and National Association of Basketball Coaches All-District East Second Team.

== Professional career ==
Eisendorf played in the Israeli Basketball Premier League for Hapoel Tel Aviv in 2019–20, and has also played in the league for Bnei Herzliya Basket since 2020.

On April 11, 2021, he was loaned to Hapoel Galil Elyon. On July 16, 2021, he signed a contract and became a permanent player for Hapoel Galil Elyon.
