= 2016–17 Utah Utes men's basketball team =

American college basketball season

2016–17 Utah Utes men's basketball

NIT, First Round
- Conference: Pac-12 Conference
- Record: 20–12 (11–7 Pac–12)
- Head coach: Larry Krystkowiak (6th season)
- Assistant coaches: Tommy Connor; DeMarlo Slocum; Andy Hill
- Home arena: Jon M. Huntsman Center

2016–17 Pac-12 Conference men's basketball standings
	Conf.				Overall
Team	W		L	PCT	W		L	PCT
No. 9 Oregon	16	–	2	.889	33	–	6	.846
No. 4 Arizona †	16	–	2	.889	32	–	5	.865
No. 8 UCLA	15	–	3	.833	31	–	5	.861
Utah	11	–	7	.611	20	–	12	.625
California	10	–	8	.556	21	–	13	.618
USC	10	–	8	.556	26	–	10	.722
Colorado	8	–	10	.444	19	–	15	.559
Arizona State	7	–	11	.389	15	–	18	.455
Stanford	6	–	12	.333	14	–	17	.452
Washington State	6	–	12	.333	13	–	18	.419
Washington	2	–	16	.111	9	–	22	.290
Oregon State	1	–	17	.056	5	–	27	.156
† Pac-12 Tournament winner Rankings from AP poll

The 2016–17 Utah Runnin' Utes men's basketball team represented the University of Utah during the 2016–17 NCAA Division I men's basketball season. The team was led by sixth-year head coach Larry Krystkowiak. They played their home games at the Jon M. Huntsman Center in Salt Lake City, Utah as members of the Pac-12 Conference. They finished the season 20–12, 11–7 in Pac-12 play to finish in fourth place. They lost in the quarterfinals of the Pac-12 tournament to California. They received an invitation to the National Invitation Tournament where they lost in the first round to Boise State.

== Previous season ==
The Utes finished the 2015–16 season 27–9, 13–5 in the Pac-12 play to finish in second place. In the Pac-12 tournament, the Utes defeated USC and California to advance to the championship game where they lost to Oregon. They received an at-large bid to the NCAA tournament, as a No. 3 seed in the Midwest Region. They beat Fresno State in the first round before losing in the No. 11-seed Gonzaga in the second round.

== Off-season ==
=== Departures ===
Name	Num	Pos.	Height	Weight	Year	Hometown	Notes
Austin Eastman	5	G	6'3"	180	Sr.	Billings, MT	Walk-on; graduated
Brandon Taylor	11	G	5'10"	170	Sr.	Los Angeles, CA	Graduated
Dakarai Tucker	14	G/F	6'5"	194	Sr.	Los Angeles, CA	Graduated
Jordan Loveridge	21	F	6'6"	220	Sr.	West Jordan, UT	Graduated
Chris Reyes	20	F	6'7"	236	Jr.	La Vern, CA	Transferred to Pepperdine
Kenneth Ogbe	25	G	6'6"	194	So.	Ehingen, Germany	Transferred to Utah Valley
Brekkott Chapman	0	F	6'8"	205	So.	Roy, UT	Transferred to Weber State
Isaiah Wright	1	G	6'2"	180	So.	Boise, ID	Transferred to San Diego
Jakob Poeltl	42	C	7'0"	248	So.	Vienna, Austria	Declared for 2016 NBA draft
Makol Mawien	40	F/C	6'9"	210	Fr.	West Valley City, UT	Transferred to New Mexico Junior College

=== Incoming transfers ===
Name	Pos.	Height	Weight	Year	Hometown	Notes
Tim Coleman	G	6'1"	190	Jr.	Cincinnati, OH	Junior college transfer from Lee College.
JoJo Zamora	G	6'2"	170	Jr.	Oakland, CA	Junior college transfer from Yuba College.
Sedrick Barefield	G	6'2"	190	So.	Corona, CA	Mid-season transfer from SMU. Will be eligible to play after Utah's fall semester.
David Collette	F	6'10"	220	Jr.	Murray, UT	Mid-season transfer from Utah State. Will be eligible to play after Utah's fall semester.
Tyler Rawson	F	6'10"	225	Jr.	American Fork, UT	Junior college transfer from Salt Lake Community College.

=== 2016 recruiting class ===
College recruiting information
Name	Hometown	School	Height	Weight	Commit date
Devon Daniels; SG	Kalamazoo, MI	Prolific Prep	6 ft 4 in (1.93 m)	185 lb (84 kg)	Oct 21, 2015
Devon Daniels; SG	Recruit ratings: Scout: Rivals: 247Sports: ESPN:				
Overall recruit ranking:
Note: In many cases, Scout, Rivals, 247Sports, On3, and ESPN may conflict in their listings of height and weight.; In these cases, the average was taken. ESPN grades are on a 100-point scale.; Sources: "2016 Utah Basketball Commitment List". Rivals.; "Utah Utes 2016 Player Commits". ESPN.; "2016 Team Ranking". Rivals.

College recruiting information (2017)
Name	Hometown	School	Height	Weight	Commit date
Jaxon Brenchley; SG	Hyrum, UT	Mountain Crest High School	6 ft 4 in (1.93 m)	180 lb (82 kg)	Aug 31, 2016
Jaxon Brenchley; SG	Recruit ratings: Scout: Rivals: 247Sports: ESPN: (75)				
Branden Carlsen; PF	South Jordan, UT	Bingham High School	6 ft 10 in (2.08 m)	210 lb (95 kg)	Oct 23, 2016
Branden Carlsen; PF	Recruit ratings: Scout: Rivals: 247Sports: ESPN: (80)				
Overall recruit ranking:
Note: In many cases, Scout, Rivals, 247Sports, On3, and ESPN may conflict in their listings of height and weight.; In these cases, the average was taken. ESPN grades are on a 100-point scale.; Sources: "2016 Utah Basketball Commitment List". Rivals.; "Utah Utes 2016 Player Commits". ESPN.; "2016 Team Ranking". Rivals.

== Roster ==
2016–17 Utah Utes men's basketball team
Players
Coaches

Pos.	#	Name	Height	Weight	Year	Previous school	Hometown
G	1	JoJo Zamora	6 ft 2 in (1.88 m)	170 lb (77 kg)	Jr	Yuba College	Oakland, California
G	2	Sedrick Barefield	6 ft 2 in (1.88 m)	190 lb (86 kg)	So	Southern Methodist	Corona, California
G	3	Devon Daniels	6 ft 5 in (1.96 m)	200 lb (91 kg)	Fr	Prolific Prep	Battle Creek, Michigan
G	5	Parker Van Dyke	6 ft 3 in (1.91 m)	185 lb (84 kg)	RS So	East HS	Salt Lake City, Utah
G	10	Jake Connor (W)	6 ft 3 in (1.91 m)	181 lb (82 kg)	RS So	Highland HS	Salt Lake City, Utah
F	11	Chris Seeley	6 ft 8 in (2.03 m)	215 lb (98 kg)	Fr	Central HS	Fresno, California
F	13	David Collette	6 ft 10 in (2.08 m)	220 lb (100 kg)	Jr	Utah State	Murray, Utah
G	15	Lorenzo Bonam	6 ft 4 in (1.93 m)	189 lb (86 kg)	Sr	Gillette College	Inkster, Michigan
G	20	Beau Rydalch (W)	6 ft 6 in (1.98 m)	205 lb (93 kg)	Fr	South Summit HS	Oakley, Utah
F	21	Tyler Rawson	6 ft 10 in (2.08 m)	225 lb (102 kg)	Jr	Salt Lake C.C.	American Fork, Utah
G/F	30	Gabe Bealer	6 ft 6 in (1.98 m)	183 lb (83 kg)	RS Jr	CCSF	San Francisco, California
F/C	34	Jayce Johnson	7 ft 0 in (2.13 m)	235 lb (107 kg)	RS Fr	Santa Monica HS	Mission Viejo, California
F	35	Kyle Kuzma	6 ft 9 in (2.06 m)	221 lb (100 kg)	Jr	Rise Academy	Burton, Michigan
F	40	Marc Reininger (W)	6 ft 9 in (2.06 m)	220 lb (100 kg)	Fr	Regis Jesuit HS	Monument, Colorado
F	43	Jakub Jokl	6 ft 11 in (2.11 m)	230 lb (104 kg)	Fr	Canarias	Havlíčkův Brod, Czech Republic

Head coach

- Larry Krystkowiak (Montana)

Assistant coach(es)

- Tommy Connor (Utah)
- Andy Hill (Eastern Washington)
- DeMarlo Slocum (Georgia Southern)

Legend

- (C) Team captain
- (S) Suspended
- (I) Ineligible
- (W) Walk-on
- Injured
- Current redshirt

Roster

- Dec. 12, 2016- Junior guard Tim Coleman elected to transfer after eight games into the season.

== Schedule and results ==
Date time, TV	Rank^{#}	Opponent^{#}	Result	Record	Site (attendance) city, state
Non-conference regular season
Nov. 12, 2016*; 5:00 PM, P12N		Northwest Nazarene	W 81–37	1–0	Jon M. Huntsman Center (11,275); Salt Lake City, UT
Nov. 15, 2016*; 6:00 PM, P12N		Concordia (OR)	W 96–53	2–0	Jon M. Huntsman Center (10,179); Salt Lake City, UT
Nov. 18, 2016*; 6:00 PM, P12N		Coppin State	W 94–51	3–0	Jon M. Huntsman Center (10,693); Salt Lake City, UT
Nov. 25, 2016*; 7:00 PM, P12N		UC Riverside	W 85–67	4–0	Jon M. Huntsman Center (11,324); Salt Lake City, UT
Nov. 28, 2016*; 7:00 PM, P12N		No. 18 Butler	L 59–68	4–1	Jon M. Huntsman Center (14,332); Salt Lake City, UT
Dec. 1, 2016*; 7:00 PM, P12N		Montana State	W 92–84	5–1	Jon M. Huntsman Center (10,548); Salt Lake City, UT
Dec. 6, 2016*; 6:00 PM, P12N		Utah Valley; Old Oquirrh Bucket	W 87–80	6–1	Jon M. Huntsman Center (12,457); Salt Lake City, UT
Dec. 10, 2016*; 3:30 PM, FOX		at No. 13 Xavier	L 69–77	6–2	Cintas Center (10,350); Cincinnati, OH
Dec. 17, 2016*; 4:00 PM, P12N		Prairie View A&M	W 92–60	7–2	Jon M. Huntsman Center (13,100); Salt Lake City, UT
Dec. 22, 2016*; 9:00 PM, ESPNU		vs. San Francisco; Diamond Head Classic quarterfinal	L 86–89	7–3	Stan Sheriff Center (6,659); Honolulu, HI
Dec. 23, 2016*; 10:30 PM, ESPNU		vs. Hawaii; Diamond Head Classic 2nd round consolation	W 66–52	8–3	Stan Sheriff Center (6,053); Honolulu, HI
Dec. 25, 2016*; 12:30 PM, ESPNU		vs. Stephen F. Austin; Diamond Head Classic 5th place game	W 74–66	9–3	Stan Sheriff Center (5,769); Honolulu, HI
Pac-12 regular season
Jan. 1, 2017; 4:30 PM, ESPNU		Colorado	W 76–60	10–3 (1–0)	Jon M. Huntsman Center (12,108); Salt Lake City, UT
Jan. 5, 2017; 8:00 PM, FS1		at No. 17 Arizona	L 56–66	10–4 (1–1)	McKale Center (14,302); Tucson, AZ
Jan. 7, 2017; 3:00 PM, P12N		at Arizona State	W 88–82	11–4 (2–1)	Wells Fargo Arena (6,501); Tempe, AZ
Jan. 12, 2017; 7:00 PM, P12N		No. 25 USC	W 86–64	12–4 (3–1)	Jon M. Huntsman Center (12,470); Salt Lake City, UT
Jan. 14, 2017; 4:00 PM, P12N		No. 4 UCLA	L 82–83	12–5 (3–2)	Jon M. Huntsman Center (15,027); Salt Lake City, UT
Jan. 18, 2017; 7:00 PM, P12N		at Washington State	W 88–47	13–5 (4–2)	Beasley Coliseum (2,928); Pullman, WA
Jan. 21, 2017; 6:00 PM, P12N		at Washington	W 94–72	14–5 (5–2)	Alaska Airlines Arena (8,895); Seattle, WA
Jan. 26, 2017; 8:30 PM, FS1		No. 10 Oregon	L 67–73	14–6 (5–3)	Jon M. Huntsman Center (15,000); Salt Lake City, UT
Jan. 28, 2017; 5:00 PM, P12N		Oregon State	W 86–78	15–6 (6–3)	Jon M. Huntsman Center (13,115); Salt Lake City, UT
Feb. 2, 2017; 7:00 PM, P12N		at California	L 75–77 ^{2OT}	15–7 (6–4)	Haas Pavilion (9,246); Berkeley, CA
Feb. 4, 2017; 2:30 PM, FS1		at Stanford	L 75–81	15–8 (6–5)	Maples Pavilion (4,447); Stanford, CA
Feb. 9, 2017; 7:00 PM, P12N		Washington State	W 74–70	16–8 (7–5)	Jon M. Huntsman Center (12,800); Salt Lake City, UT
Feb. 11, 2017; 2:30 PM, FS1		Washington	W 85–61	17–8 (8–5)	Jon M. Huntsman Center (13,216); Salt Lake City, UT
Feb. 16, 2017; 9:00 PM, ESPN2		at No. 7 Oregon	L 61–79	17–9 (8–6)	Matthew Knight Arena (12,364); Eugene, OR
Feb. 18, 2017; 6:30 PM, ESPNU		at Oregon State	L 67–68	17–10 (8–7)	Gill Coliseum (5,186); Corvallis, OR
Feb. 23, 2017; 9:00 PM, ESPNU		at Colorado	W 86–81	18–10 (9–7)	Coors Events Center (7,142); Boulder, CO
Mar. 2, 2017; 9:00 PM, ESPNU		California	W 74–44	19–10 (10–7)	Jon M. Huntsman Center (12,876); Salt Lake City, UT
Mar. 4, 2017; 2:00 PM, P12N		Stanford	W 67–59	20–10 (11–7)	Jon M. Huntsman Center (12,370); Salt Lake City, UT
Pac-12 tournament
Mar. 9, 2017; 3:30 PM, P12N	(4)	vs. (5) California; Quarterfinals	L 75–78	20–11	T-Mobile Arena (12,782); Paradise, NV
NIT
Mar. 14, 2017*; 8:00 PM, ESPNU	(3)	(6) Boise State; First round – Illinois State Bracket	L 68–73	20–12	Jon M. Huntsman Center (4,097); Salt Lake City, UT
*Non-conference game. ^{#}Rankings from AP Poll. (#) Tournament seedings in parentheses. All times are in Mountain Time.
