= 2016–17 Washington Huskies men's basketball team =

American college basketball season

2016–17 Washington Huskies men's basketball
- Conference: Pac-12 Conference
- Record: 9–22 (2–16 Pac-12)
- Head coach: Lorenzo Romar (15th season)
- Assistant coaches: Raphael Chillious; Will Conroy; Michael Porter
- Home arena: Alaska Airlines Arena

2016–17 Pac-12 Conference men's basketball standings
	Conf.				Overall
Team	W		L	PCT	W		L	PCT
No. 9 Oregon	16	–	2	.889	33	–	6	.846
No. 4 Arizona †	16	–	2	.889	32	–	5	.865
No. 8 UCLA	15	–	3	.833	31	–	5	.861
Utah	11	–	7	.611	20	–	12	.625
California	10	–	8	.556	21	–	13	.618
USC	10	–	8	.556	26	–	10	.722
Colorado	8	–	10	.444	19	–	15	.559
Arizona State	7	–	11	.389	15	–	18	.455
Stanford	6	–	12	.333	14	–	17	.452
Washington State	6	–	12	.333	13	–	18	.419
Washington	2	–	16	.111	9	–	22	.290
Oregon State	1	–	17	.056	5	–	27	.156
† Pac-12 Tournament winner Rankings from AP poll

The 2016–17 Washington Huskies men's basketball team represented the University of Washington in the 2016–17 NCAA Division I men's basketball season. Members of the Pac-12 Conference, the Huskies were led by fifteenth-year head coach Lorenzo Romar and played their home games on campus at Alaska Airlines Arena at Hec Edmundson Pavilion in Seattle, Washington.

The Huskies finished the season 9–22, 2–16 in Pac-12 play, in eleventh place. In the Pac-12 tournament, they lost in the first round to sixth-seeded USC. Romar was fired on March 15; four days later, he was succeeded by Mike Hopkins, a longtime assistant at Syracuse under Jim Boeheim.

== Previous season ==
The Huskies finished the 2015–16 season 19–15, 9–9 in Pac-12 play to finish in a three-way for sixth place. The Huskies defeated Stanford in the first round of the Pac-12 tournament before losing to Oregon in the quarterfinals. They received an invitation to the National Invitation Tournament as the No. 3 seed. There they defeated Long Beach State in the first round before losing to San Diego State in the second round.

== Off-season ==
=== Departures ===
Name	Number	Pos.	Height	Weight	Year	Hometown	Reason for departure
Marquese Chriss	0	F	6'9"	225	Freshman	Sacramento, CA	Declared for 2016 NBA draft
Dejounte Murray	5	G	6'5"	170	Freshman	Seattle, WA	Declared for 2016 NBA draft
Andrew Andrews	12	G	6'2"	200	RS senior	Portland, OR	Graduated
Donaven Dorsey	42	G	6'5"	210	Sophomore	Lacey, WA	Transferred to Montana

=== 2016 recruiting class ===
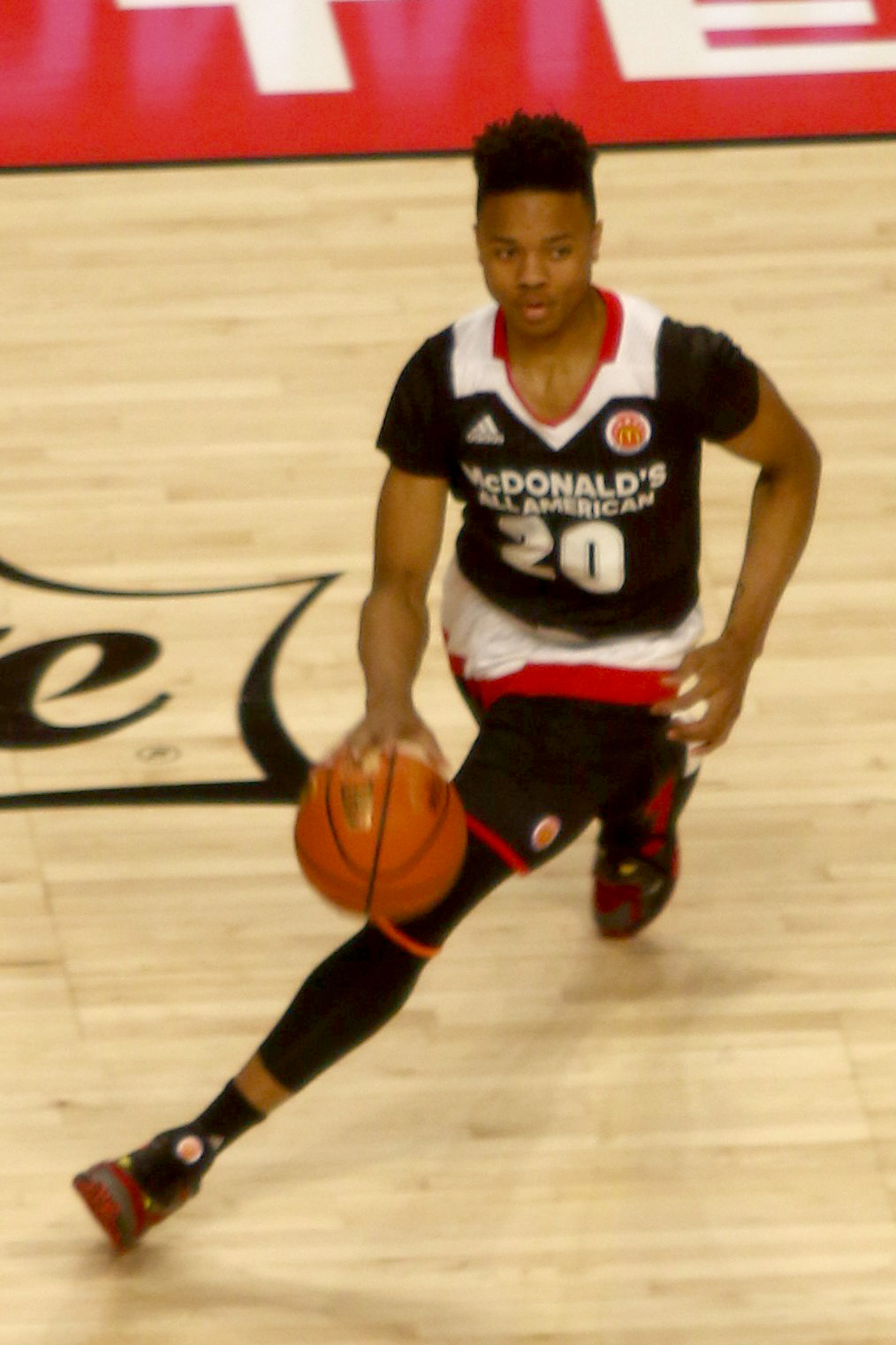
Markelle Fultz at the 2016 McDonald's All-American Game

College recruiting
Name	Hometown	School	Height	Weight	Commit date
Sam Timmins; C	Christchurch, NZ	Middleton Grange School	6 ft 10 in (2.08 m)	250 lb (110 kg)	Apr 28, 2015
Sam Timmins; C	Recruit ratings: Scout: Rivals: 247Sports: ESPN: (NR)				
Markelle Fultz; SG	Upper Marlboro, MD	DeMatha Catholic High School	6 ft 4 in (1.93 m)	185 lb (84 kg)	Aug 21, 2015
Markelle Fultz; SG	Recruit ratings: Scout: Rivals: 247Sports: ESPN: (96)				
Carlos Johnson; G/F	Oakland, CA	Findlay Prep	6 ft 4 in (1.93 m)	220 lb (100 kg)	May 19, 2016
Carlos Johnson; G/F	Recruit ratings: Scout: Rivals: 247Sports: ESPN: (66)				
Harold Baruti; SF	Dallas, TX	Mountain Mission School	6 ft 6 in (1.98 m)	200 lb (91 kg)	Jun 29, 2016
Harold Baruti; SF	Recruit ratings: Scout: Rivals: 247Sports: ESPN: (NR)				
Overall recruit ranking:
Note: In many cases, Scout, Rivals, 247Sports, On3, and ESPN may conflict in their listings of height and weight.; In these cases, the average was taken. ESPN grades are on a 100-point scale.; Sources: "2016 Washington Signees". Rivals.; "2016 Washington Signees". Scout.; "2016 Washington Signees". ESPN.; "Scout.com Team Recruiting Rankings". Scout.; "2016 Team Ranking". Rivals.

== Roster ==
2016–17 Washington Huskies men's basketball team
Players
Coaches

Pos.	#	Name	Height	Weight	Year	Previous school	Hometown
G	0	Bitumba Baruti	6 ft 6 in (1.98 m)	210 lb (95 kg)	Fr	Mountain Mission School	DR Congo
G	1	David Crisp	6 ft 0 in (1.83 m)	195 lb (88 kg)	So	Brewster Academy	Tacoma, WA
G	2	Dan Kingma	5 ft 10 in (1.78 m)	160 lb (73 kg)	Jr	Henry M. Jackson HS	Mill Creek, WA
G/F	4	Matisse Thybulle	6 ft 5 in (1.96 m)	195 lb (88 kg)	So	Eastside Catholic School	Issaquah, WA
G	5	Quin Barnard (W)	6 ft 0 in (1.83 m)	175 lb (79 kg)	Fr	O'Dea HS	Bellevue, WA
C	10	Malik Dime (C)	6 ft 9 in (2.06 m)	220 lb (100 kg)	Sr	Indian Hills CC	Dakar, SN
F	15	Noah Dickerson	6 ft 8 in (2.03 m)	245 lb (111 kg)	So	Montverde Academy	Atlanta, GA
G	20	Markelle Fultz	6 ft 4 in (1.93 m)	195 lb (88 kg)	Fr	DeMatha Catholic HS	Upper Marlboro, MD
F	22	Dominic Green	6 ft 6 in (1.98 m)	190 lb (86 kg)	So	Hazen HS	Renton, WA
G	23	Carlos Johnson	6 ft 3 in (1.91 m)	235 lb (107 kg)	Fr	Findlay Prep	Centralia, IL
F	24	Devenir Duruisseau	6 ft 8 in (2.03 m)	245 lb (111 kg)	So	Fishburne Military School	Palmdale, CA
F	32	Greg Bowman (W)	6 ft 7 in (2.01 m)	225 lb (102 kg)	Jr	Mountlake Terrace HS	Mountlake Terrace, WA
C	33	Sam Timmins	6 ft 11 in (2.11 m)	265 lb (120 kg)	Fr	Middleton Grange School	Dunedin, NZ
F	41	Matthew Atewe	6 ft 9 in (2.06 m)	250 lb (113 kg)	RS Jr	Auburn	Toronto, ON

Head coach

- Lorenzo Romar (Washington)

Assistant coach(es)

- Raphael Chillious (Lafayette)
- Will Conroy (Washington)
- Michael Porter (LSU New Orleans)

Legend

- (C) Team captain
- (S) Suspended
- (I) Ineligible
- (W) Walk-on
- Injured
- Current redshirt

Roster
Last update: March 2017

=== Depth chart ===
Pos.	Starting 5	Bench 1	Bench 2
C	Malik Dime	Sam Timmins
PF	Noah Dickerson	Matthew Atewe	Devenir Duruisseau
SF	Matisse Thybulle	Dominic Green	Greg Bowman
SG	Markelle Fultz	Carlos Johnson	Bitumba Baruti
PG	David Crisp	Dan Kingma	Quin Barnard

=== Coaching staff ===
Name	Position	Year at Washington	Alma mater (year)
Lorenzo Romar	Head coach	15th	Washington (1980)
Raphael Chillious	Associate head coach	7th	Lafayette (1996)
Will Conroy	Assistant coach	2nd	Washington (2005)
Michael Porter	Assistant coach	1st	New Orleans (1989)
Brad Jackson	Special assistant to the head coach	5th	Washington State (1975)
Tiffani Lambie	Director of basketball operations	3rd	Illinois (2003)
Daniel Shapiro	Strength and conditioning Coach	4th	Seattle Pacific (2000)

== Schedule and results ==
Date time, TV	Rank^{#}	Opponent^{#}	Result	Record	High points	High rebounds	High assists	Site (attendance) city, state
Exhibition
Nov. 3, 2016*; 7:00 pm		Western Washington	W 109–103	–	25 – Green	7 – 2 Tied	5 – Fultz	Alaska Airlines Arena (6,805); Seattle, WA
Non-conference regular season
Nov. 13, 2016*; 2:00 pm, P12N		Yale	L 90–98	0–1	30 – Fultz	7 – Fultz	6 – Fultz	Alaska Airlines Arena (7,456); Seattle, WA
Nov. 17, 2016*; 8:00 pm, P12N		Cal State Fullerton; Global Sports Classic campus-site game	W 104–88	1–1	35 – Fultz	8 – Dime	6 – Fultz	Alaska Airlines Arena (6,284); Seattle, WA
Nov. 20, 2016*; 5:00 pm, P12N		Northern Arizona; Global Sports Classic campus-site game	W 92–58	2–1	16 – Fultz	8 – Dickerson	8 – Fultz	Alaska Airlines Arena (6,804); Seattle, WA
Nov. 22, 2016*; 8:00 pm, P12N		Long Beach State	W 94–88	3–1	26 – Crisp	7 – Dickerson	6 – Fultz	Alaska Airlines Arena (6,568); Seattle, WA
Nov. 25, 2016*; 5:00 pm		vs. Western Kentucky; Global Sports Classic semifinal	W 86–47	4–1	20 – Green	12 – Timmins	10 – Fultz	Thomas & Mack Center (9,815); Paradise, NV
Nov. 26, 2016*; 7:30 pm		vs. TCU; Global Sports Classic championship	L 80–93	4–2	27 – Fultz	10 – Dickerson	4 – Tied	Thomas & Mack Center (8,810); Paradise, NV
Nov. 30, 2016*; 4:00 pm, FSSW+		at TCU	L 71–86	4–3	21 – Fultz	14 – Fultz	6 – Fultz	Schollmaier Arena (5,966); Fort Worth, TX
Dec. 7, 2016*; 8:00 pm, ESPN2		at No. 8 Gonzaga; Rivalry	L 71–98	4–4	25 – Fultz	10 – Fultz	2 – Crisp	McCarthey Athletic Center (6,000); Spokane, WA
Dec. 11, 2016*; 5:00 pm, P12N		Nevada	L 85–87	4–5	21 – Tied	7 – Dickerson	8 – Fultz	Alaska Airlines Arena (8,171); Seattle, WA
Dec. 18, 2016*; 5:00 pm, P12N		Western Michigan	W 92–86	5–5	27 – Fultz	8 – Fultz	10 – Fultz	Alaska Airlines Arena (7,129); Seattle, WA
Dec. 20, 2016*; 8:00 pm, P12N		Cal Poly	W 77–61	6–5	21 – Crisp	10 – Dickerson	5 – Fultz	Alaska Airlines Arena (7,175); Seattle, WA
Dec. 22, 2016*; 7:00 pm		at Seattle; Elgin Baylor Classic	W 94–72	7–5	21 – Dickerson	17 – Dickerson	7 – Crisp	KeyArena (6,163); Seattle, WA
Pac-12 regular season
Jan. 1, 2017; 5:30 pm, ESPNU		Washington State; Rivalry	L 74–79	7–6 (0–1)	26 – Fultz	9 – Fultz	11 – Fultz	Alaska Airlines Arena (9,259); Seattle, WA
Jan. 4, 2017; 6:00 pm, ESPN2		No. 15 Oregon	L 61–83	7–7 (0–2)	22 – Fultz	11 – Dime	4 – Fultz	Alaska Airlines Arena (8,145); Seattle, WA
Jan. 7, 2017; 12:00 pm, P12N		Oregon State	W 87–61	8–7 (1–2)	20 – Fultz	9 – Dickerson	10 – Crisp	Alaska Airlines Arena (7,781); Seattle, WA
Jan. 12, 2017; 6:00 pm, FS1		at California	L 59–69	8–8 (1–3)	16 – Crisp	9 – Dickerson	4 – Fultz	Haas Pavilion (9,093); Berkeley, CA
Jan. 14, 2017; 5:00 pm, P12N		at Stanford	L 69–76	8–9 (1–4)	34 – Fultz	7 – Tied	3 – Tied	Maples Pavilion (3,673); Stanford, CA
Jan. 18, 2017; 8:00 pm, ESPNU		Colorado	W 85–83 ^{OT}	9–9 (2–4)	37 – Fultz	7 – Dickerson	8 – Fultz	Alaska Airlines Arena (6,416); Seattle, WA
Jan. 21, 2017; 5:00 pm, P12N		Utah	L 72–94	9–10 (2–5)	30 – Fultz	7 – Fultz	4 – Fultz	Alaska Airlines Arena (8,895); Seattle, WA
Jan. 25, 2017; 8:00 pm, ESPNU		at Arizona State	L 75–86	9–11 (2–6)	28 – Fultz	10 – Dickerson	9 – Fultz	Wells Fargo Arena (5,129); Temple, AZ
Jan. 29, 2017; 12:30 pm, FOX		at No. 7 Arizona	L 66–77	9–12 (2–7)	16 – Fultz	9 – Tied	3 – Tied	McKale Center (14,644); Tucson, AZ
Feb. 1, 2017; 8:00 pm, ESPNU		USC	L 74–82	9–13 (2–8)	20 – Fultz	9 – Dickerson	6 – Fultz	Alaska Airlines Arena (7,223); Seattle, WA
Feb. 4, 2017; 7:30 pm, P12N		No. 11 UCLA	L 66–107	9–14 (2–9)	25 – Fultz	6 – Tied	5 – Fultz	Alaska Airlines Arena (10,000); Seattle, WA
Feb. 9, 2017; 7:00 pm, FS1		at Colorado	L 66–81	9–15 (2–10)	17 – Crisp	11 – Timmins	3 – Tied	Coors Events Center (7,387); Boulder, CO
Feb. 11, 2017; 1:30 pm, FS1		at Utah	L 61–85	9–16 (2–11)	31 – Crisp	6 – Johnson	3 – Thybulle	Jon M. Huntsman Center (13,216); Salt Lake City, UT
Feb. 16, 2017; 8:00 pm, FS1		Arizona State	L 81–83	9–17 (2–12)	19 – Tied	12 – Johnson	4 – Fultz	Alaska Airlines Arena (6,910); Seattle, WA
Feb. 18, 2017; 5:00 pm, ESPN2		No. 5 Arizona	L 68–76	9–18 (2–13)	26 – Fultz	9 – Dickerson	6 – Fultz	Alaska Airlines Arena (9,482); Seattle, WA
Feb. 26, 2017; 5:30 pm, ESPNU		at Washington State; Rivalry	L 71–79	9–19 (2–14)	17 – Johnson	13 – Dickerson	4 – Crisp	Beasley Coliseum (5,003); Pullman, WA
Mar. 1, 2017; 8:00 pm, FS1		at No. 3 UCLA	L 66–98	9–20 (2–15)	23 – Dickerson	15 – Dickerson	5 – Crisp	Pauley Pavilion (13,659); Los Angeles, CA
Mar. 4, 2017; 3:30 pm, P12N		at USC	L 58–74	9–21 (2–16)	27 – Dickerson	8 – Dickerson	4 – Crisp	Galen Center (7,256); Los Angeles, CA
Pac-12 Tournament
Mar. 8, 2017; 8:30 pm, P12N	(11)	vs. (6) USC; First round	L 73–78	9–22	22 – Crisp	8 – Crisp	7 – Crisp	T-Mobile Arena (9,978); Paradise, NV
*Non-conference game. ^{#}Rankings from AP poll. (#) Tournament seedings in parentheses. All times are in Pacific Time.
