= 2016–17 Oregon State Beavers men's basketball team =

American college basketball season

2016–17 Oregon State Beavers men's basketball
- Conference: Pac-12 Conference
- Record: 5–27 (1–17 Pac-12)
- Head coach: Wayne Tinkle (3rd season)
- Assistant coaches: Kerry Rupp; Gregg Gottlieb; Stephen Thompson
- Home arena: Gill Coliseum

2016–17 Pac-12 Conference men's basketball standings
	Conf.				Overall
Team	W		L	PCT	W		L	PCT
No. 9 Oregon	16	–	2	.889	33	–	6	.846
No. 4 Arizona †	16	–	2	.889	32	–	5	.865
No. 8 UCLA	15	–	3	.833	31	–	5	.861
Utah	11	–	7	.611	20	–	12	.625
California	10	–	8	.556	21	–	13	.618
USC	10	–	8	.556	26	–	10	.722
Colorado	8	–	10	.444	19	–	15	.559
Arizona State	7	–	11	.389	15	–	18	.455
Stanford	6	–	12	.333	14	–	17	.452
Washington State	6	–	12	.333	13	–	18	.419
Washington	2	–	16	.111	9	–	22	.290
Oregon State	1	–	17	.056	5	–	27	.156
† Pac-12 Tournament winner Rankings from AP poll

The 2016–17 Oregon State Beavers men's basketball team represented Oregon State University in the 2016–17 NCAA Division I men's basketball season. The Beavers were led by third-year head coach Wayne Tinkle, and played their home games at Gill Coliseum in Corvallis, Oregon as members of the Pac-12 Conference. They finished the season 5–27, 1–17 in Pac-12 play to finish in last place. They lost in the first round of the Pac-12 tournament to California.

== Previous season ==
The Beavers finished the 2015–16 season 19–13, 9–9 in Pac-12 play to finish in a three-way tie for sixth place. They defeated Arizona State in the first round of the Pac-12 tournament before losing to California in the quarterfinals. OSU received an at-large bid to the NCAA tournament as the No. 7 seed in the West Region, marking the Beavers' first NCAA Tournament appearance since 1990. The Beavers lost in the first round of the tournament to VCU.

== Off-season ==
=== Departures ===
Name	Number	Pos.	Height	Weight	Year	Hometown	Reason for departure
Gary Payton II	1	G	6'3"	190	Senior	Las Vegas, NV	Graduated
Derrick Bruce	4	G	6'3"	165	Freshman	Orlando, FL	Transferred to NW Florida State College
Langston Morris-Walker	13	G	6'5"	215	Senior	Berkeley, CA	Graduated
Daniel Gomis	14	F	6'10"	240	RS senior	Thiès, Senegal	Graduated
Olaf Schaftenaar	30	F	6'10"	235	Senior	Utrecht, Ukraine	Graduated
Jarmal Reid	32	F	6'7"	235	Senior	Decatur, GA	Graduated
Justin Stangel	40	C	6'10"	225	Junior	Milwaukie, OR	Walk-on; left the team for personal reasons

=== Incoming transfers ===
Name	Num	Pos.	Height	Weight	Year	Hometown	Notes
Ronnie Stacey	2	G	6'4"		Junior	Alexander City, AL	Junior college transfer from Tyler Junior College
Keondre Dew	13	F	6'8"	220	Junior	San Bernardino, CA	Junior college transfer from City College of San Francisco

=== 2016 recruiting class ===
College recruiting
Name	Hometown	School	Height	Weight	Commit date
Ben Koné; PF	San Jose, CA	Archbishop Mitty HS	6 ft 9 in (2.06 m)	240 lb (110 kg)	Aug 11, 2015
Ben Koné; PF	Recruit ratings: Scout: Rivals: 247Sports: ESPN:				
JaQuori McLaughlin; PG	Gig Harbor, WA	Peninsula HS	6 ft 3 in (1.91 m)	170 lb (77 kg)	Sep 25, 2015
JaQuori McLaughlin; PG	Recruit ratings: Scout: Rivals: 247Sports: ESPN:				
Overall recruit ranking:
Note: In many cases, Scout, Rivals, 247Sports, On3, and ESPN may conflict in their listings of height and weight.; In these cases, the average was taken. ESPN grades are on a 100-point scale.; Sources: "2016 Basketball Player Commits". ESPN.; "2016 Team Ranking". Rivals.

== Roster ==
2016–17 Oregon State Beavers men's basketball team
Players
Coaches

Pos.	#	Name	Height	Weight	Year	Previous school	Hometown
G	0	JaQuori McLaughlin	6 ft 4 in (1.93 m)	185 lb (84 kg)	Fr	Peninsula High School	Tacoma, Washington
G	1	Stephen Thompson Jr.	6 ft 4 in (1.93 m)	175 lb (79 kg)	So	Bishop Montgomery High School	Los Angeles, California
G	2	Ronnie Stacy	6 ft 4 in (1.93 m)	195 lb (88 kg)	Jr	Tyler Junior College	Alexander City, Alabama
F	3	Tres Tinkle (injured)	6 ft 8 in (2.03 m)	220 lb (100 kg)	So	Hellgate High School	Missoula, Montana
C	5	Cheikh N'diaye	7 ft 0 in (2.13 m)	240 lb (109 kg)	Sr	Army and Navy Academy	Dakar, Senegal
F	12	Drew Eubanks	6 ft 10 in (2.08 m)	250 lb (113 kg)	So	Reynolds High School	Troutdale, Oregon
F	13	Keondre Dew	6 ft 8 in (2.03 m)	220 lb (100 kg)	Jr	City College of San Francisco	San Bernardino, California
F	14	Matt Dahlen	6 ft 6 in (1.98 m)	205 lb (93 kg)	Jr	Redmond High School	Redmond, Oregon
G	15	Tanner Sanders (W)	6 ft 5 in (1.96 m)	210 lb (95 kg)	RS So	Crescent Valley High School	Corvallis, Oregon
G	22	Daine Muller (W)	6 ft 4 in (1.93 m)	200 lb (91 kg)	Jr	Skyview High School	Billings, Montana
C	23	Gligorije Rakocevic	6 ft 11 in (2.11 m)	255 lb (116 kg)	So	Cantwell-Sacred Heart of Mary High School	Bijelo Polje, Montenegro
G	24	Kendal Manuel	6 ft 4 in (1.93 m)	185 lb (84 kg)	RS Fr	Skyview High School	Billings, Montana
C	31	Christian Russell (W)	6 ft 11 in (2.11 m)	235 lb (107 kg)	Fr	South Salem High School	Salem, Oregon
F	34	Ben Koné	6 ft 8 in (2.03 m)	235 lb (107 kg)	Fr	Archbishop Mitty High School	San Jose, California

Head coach

- Wayne Tinkle (Montana)

Assistant coach(es)

- Kerry Rupp (Southern Utah)
- Gregg Gottlieb (UCLA)
- Stephen Thompson (Syracuse)

Legend

- (C) Team captain
- (S) Suspended
- (I) Ineligible
- (W) Walk-on
- Injured
- Current redshirt

Roster

- Nov. 27 - Sophomore forward Tres Tinkle was out since the game against Fresno State with a broken right wrist. He missed the rest of the season.

== Schedule and results ==
Date time, TV	Rank^{#}	Opponent^{#}	Result	Record	Site (attendance) city, state
Exhibition
Nov. 4; 7:00 PM		Corban	W 96–58	–	Gill Coliseum (4,663); Corvallis, OR
Non-conference regular season
Nov. 11*; 6:00 PM, P12N		Prairie View A&M	W 78–58	1–0	Gill Coliseum (4,765); Corvallis, OR
Nov. 13*; 2:00 PM, P12N		UTSA	W 72–64	2–0	Gill Coliseum (4,070); Corvallis, OR
Nov. 16*; 6:00 PM, P12N		Lamar	L 60–63	2–1	Gill Coliseum (4,182); Corvallis, OR
Nov. 18*; 7:00 PM, ESPN3		at Nevada	L 58–83	2–2	Lawlor Events Center (8,090); Reno, NV
Nov. 22*; 6:00 PM, ESPNews		at Tulsa	L 64–75	2–3	Reynolds Center (3,372); Tulsa, OK
Nov. 25*; 6:00 PM, P12N		Fresno State	L 58–63	2–4	Gill Coliseum (5,005); Corvallis, OR
Nov. 28*; 6:00 PM, P12N		Southern Oregon	W 84–59	3–4	Gill Coliseum (4,010); Corvallis, OR
Dec. 1*; 6:00 PM, ESPNU		at Mississippi State	L 57–74	3–5	Humphrey Coliseum (7,684); Starkville, MS
Dec. 3*; 4:00 PM		at Charlotte	L 66–69	3–6	Dale F. Halton Arena (5,366); Charlotte, NC
Dec. 11*; 3:00 PM, P12N		Savannah State	L 90–93 ^{OT}	3–7	Gill Coliseum (4,268); Corvallis, OR
Dec. 16*; 8:00 PM, P12N		vs. Long Beach State; Dam City Classic	L 67–71	3–8	Moda Center (6,521); Portland, OR
Dec. 18*; 3:00 PM, P12N		vs. Portland; Dam City Classic	L 45–53	3–9	Moda Center (8,334); Portland, OR
Dec. 21*; 8:00 PM, ESPNU		Kent State	W 69–50	4–9	Gill Coliseum (4,020); Corvallis, OR
Pac-12 regular season
Dec. 28; 8:00 PM, P12N		No. 22 USC	L 63–70	4–10 (0–1)	Gill Coliseum (4,580); Corvallis, OR
Dec. 30; 8:00 PM, P12N		No. 2 UCLA	L 63–76	4–11 (0–2)	Gill Coliseum (5,596); Corvallis, OR
Jan. 4; 8:00 PM, P12N		vs. Washington State	L 62–75	4–12 (0–3)	Spokane Arena (2,237); Spokane, WA
Jan. 7; 12:00 PM, P12N		at Washington	L 61–87	4–13 (0–4)	Alaska Airlines Arena (7,781); Seattle, WA
Jan. 14; 7:30 PM, P12N		at No. 13 Oregon; Civil War	L 43–85	4–14 (0–5)	Matthew Knight Arena (12,364); Eugene, OR
Jan. 19; 8:00 PM, P12N		Stanford	L 46–62	4–15 (0–6)	Gill Coliseum (4,585); Corvallis, OR
Jan. 21; 7:30 PM, P12N		California	L 58–69	4–16 (0–7)	Gill Coliseum (4,945); Corvallis, OR
Jan. 26; 5:30 PM, FS1		at Colorado	L 78–85	4–17 (0–8)	Coors Events Center (7,341); Boulder, CO
Jan. 28; 4:00 PM, P12N		at Utah	L 78–86	4–18 (0–9)	Jon M. Huntsman Center (13,115); Salt Lake City, UT
Feb. 2; 6:00 PM, ESPN2		No. 5 Arizona	L 54–71	4–19 (0–10)	Gill Coliseum (4,745); Corvallis, OR
Feb. 4; 3:00 PM, P12N		Arizona State	L 68–81	4–20 (0–11)	Gill Coliseum (4,927); Corvallis, OR
Feb. 9; 8:00 PM, P12N		at USC	L 66–92	4–21 (0–12)	Galen Center (3,989); Los Angeles, CA
Feb. 12; 2:00 PM, FS1		at No. 10 UCLA	L 60–78	4–22 (0–13)	Pauley Pavilion (12,649); Los Angeles, CA
Feb. 16; 6:00 PM, P12N		Colorado	L 52–60	4–23 (0–14)	Gill Coliseum (4,281); Corvallis, OR
Feb. 19; 5:30 PM, ESPNU		Utah	W 68–67	5–23 (1–14)	Gill Coliseum (5,186); Corvallis, OR
Feb. 22; 8:00 PM, ESPNU		at Stanford	L 66–79	5–24 (1–15)	Maples Pavilion (3,007); Stanford, CA
Feb. 24; 7:00 PM, FS1		at California	L 46–76	5–25 (1–16)	Haas Pavilion (9,500); Berkeley, CA
Mar. 4; 3:00 PM, ESPN2		No. 6 Oregon; Civil War	L 59–80	5–26 (1–17)	Gill Coliseum (9,201); Corvallis, OR
Pac-12 tournament
Mar. 8; 2:30 PM, P12N	(12)	vs. (5) California; First round	L 62–67	5–27	T-Mobile Arena (7,846); Paradise, NV
*Non-conference game. ^{#}Rankings from AP Poll. (#) Tournament seedings in parentheses. All times are in Pacific Time.
