= 2016–17 Washington State Cougars men's basketball team =

American college basketball season

2016–17 Washington State Cougars men's basketball
- Conference: Pac-12 Conference
- Record: 13–18 (6–12 Pac-12)
- Head coach: Ernie Kent (3rd season)
- Assistant coaches: Greg Graham; Silvey Dominguez; Curtis Allen
- Home arena: Beasley Coliseum

2016–17 Pac-12 Conference men's basketball standings
	Conf.				Overall
Team	W		L	PCT	W		L	PCT
No. 9 Oregon	16	–	2	.889	33	–	6	.846
No. 4 Arizona †	16	–	2	.889	32	–	5	.865
No. 8 UCLA	15	–	3	.833	31	–	5	.861
Utah	11	–	7	.611	20	–	12	.625
California	10	–	8	.556	21	–	13	.618
USC	10	–	8	.556	26	–	10	.722
Colorado	8	–	10	.444	19	–	15	.559
Arizona State	7	–	11	.389	15	–	18	.455
Stanford	6	–	12	.333	14	–	17	.452
Washington State	6	–	12	.333	13	–	18	.419
Washington	2	–	16	.111	9	–	22	.290
Oregon State	1	–	17	.056	5	–	27	.156
† Pac-12 Tournament winner Rankings from AP poll

The 2016–17 Washington State Cougars men's basketball team represented Washington State University during the 2016–17 NCAA Division I men's basketball season. The team was led by third-year head coach Ernie Kent. The Cougars played their home games at the Beasley Coliseum in Pullman, Washington as members of the Pac-12 Conference. They finished the season 13–18, 6–12 in Pac-12 play to finish in a tie for ninth place. They lost to Colorado in the first round of the Pac-12 tournament.

== Previous season ==
The Cougars finished the 2015–16 season 9–22, 1–17 in Pac-12 play to finish in last place in the conference. The Cougars lost in the first round of the Pac-12 tournament to Colorado.

== Off-season ==
=== Departures ===
Name	Num	Pos.	Height	Weight	Year	Hometown	Reason for departure
Junior Longrus	15	F	6'7"	240	Senior	Oakland, CA	Graduated
Que Johnson	32	F	6'5"	208	RS junior	Pontiac, MI	Graduate transferred to Western Kentucky
Brett Boese	33	F	6'7"	230	Senior	Spokane, WA	Graduated
Valentine Izundu	45	C	6'11"	235	RS junior	Houston, TX	Graduate transferred to San Diego State

=== Incoming transfers ===
Name	Number	Pos.	Height	Weight	Year	Hometown	Notes
Keith Langston	10	G	6'5"	190	RS sophomore	Chicago, IL	Junior college, transferred from Chabot College

=== 2016 recruiting class ===
College recruiting
Name	Hometown	School	Height	Weight	Commit date
Milan Acquaah; PG	Los Angeles, CA	Cathedral High School	6 ft 2 in (1.88 m)	195 lb (88 kg)	Feb 23, 2015
Milan Acquaah; PG	Recruit ratings: Scout: Rivals: 247Sports: ESPN:				
Jeff Pollard; PF	Bountiful, UT	Impact Basketball Academy	6 ft 8 in (2.03 m)	235 lb (107 kg)	Jun 25, 2014
Jeff Pollard; PF	Recruit ratings: Scout: Rivals: 247Sports: ESPN:				
Malachi Flynn; PG	Tacoma, WA	Bellarmine Prep	6 ft 1 in (1.85 m)	165 lb (75 kg)	Apr 13, 2016
Malachi Flynn; PG	Recruit ratings: Scout: Rivals: 247Sports: ESPN:				
Jamar Ergas; SF	Montverde, FL	Montverde Academy	6 ft 3 in (1.91 m)	175 lb (79 kg)	May 2, 2016
Jamar Ergas; SF	Recruit ratings: Scout: Rivals: 247Sports: ESPN:				
Overall recruit ranking:
Note: In many cases, Scout, Rivals, 247Sports, On3, and ESPN may conflict in their listings of height and weight.; In these cases, the average was taken. ESPN grades are on a 100-point scale.; Sources: "2016 Washington St. Basketball Commitment List". Rivals.; "2016 Washington State Cougars Basketball Commits". ESPN.; "2016 Team Ranking". Rivals.

== Roster ==
2016–17 Washington State Cougars men's basketball team
Players
Coaches

Pos.	#	Name	Height	Weight	Year	Previous school	Hometown
F	0	Derrien King	6 ft 6 in (1.98 m)	185 lb (84 kg)	Jr	Santa Monica College	Wichita, KS
G	1	Jamar Ergas	6 ft 3 in (1.91 m)	182 lb (83 kg)	Fr	Elite 1 Academy	Toronto, ON
G	2	Ike Iroegbu	6 ft 2 in (1.88 m)	195 lb (88 kg)	Sr	Oak Hill Academy	Elk Grove, CA
F	3	Robert Franks	6 ft 7 in (2.01 m)	240 lb (109 kg)	So	Evergreen HS	Vancouver, WA
G	4	Viont'e Daniels	6 ft 2 in (1.88 m)	175 lb (79 kg)	So	Federal Way HS	Federal Way, WA
G	5	Milan Acquaah	6 ft 3 in (1.91 m)	185 lb (84 kg)	Fr	Cathedral HS	Pasadena, CA
G	10	K. J. Langston	6 ft 5 in (1.96 m)	190 lb (86 kg)	RS So	Chabot College	Chicago, IL
G	12	Steven Shpreyregin	6 ft 1 in (1.85 m)	180 lb (82 kg)	Jr	Skagit Valley College	Seattle, WA
F	13	Jeff Pollard	6 ft 9 in (2.06 m)	240 lb (109 kg)	Fr	Impact Academy	Bountiful, UT
G	22	Malachi Flynn	6 ft 1 in (1.85 m)	170 lb (77 kg)	Fr	Bellarmine Prep	Tacoma, WA
G	23	Charles Callison	6 ft 0 in (1.83 m)	185 lb (84 kg)	Sr	San Bernardino Valley College	Moreno Valley, CA
F	24	Josh Hawkinson	6 ft 10 in (2.08 m)	230 lb (104 kg)	Sr	East Shorewood HS	Shoreline, WA
F	25	Arinze Chidom (W)	6 ft 9 in (2.06 m)	200 lb (91 kg)	Fr	Bishop O'Dowd HS	Oakland, CA
C	42	Conor Clifford	7 ft 0 in (2.13 m)	260 lb (118 kg)	RS Sr	Saddleback College	Huntington Beach, CA

Head coach

- Ernie Kent (Oregon)

Assistant coach(es)

- Greg Graham (Oregon)
- Silvey Dominguez (New Mexico)
- Curtis Allen (Washington)

Legend

- (C) Team captain
- (S) Suspended
- (I) Ineligible
- (W) Walk-on
- Injured
- Current redshirt

Roster

== Schedule and results ==
Date time, TV	Rank^{#}	Opponent^{#}	Result	Record	Site (attendance) city, state
Exhibition
11/06/2016*; 5:00 pm		Carroll (MT)	W 78–70		Beasley Coliseum (1,932); Pullman, WA
Non-conference regular season
11/11/2016*; 4:00 pm, P12N		Montana State	W 69–65	1–0	Beasley Coliseum; Pullman, WA
11/15/2016*; 7:00 pm, P12N		vs. Central Washington; Kennewick Showcase	W 81–76	2–0	Toyota Center (1,935); Kennewick, WA
11/18/2016*; 5:30 pm		vs. No. 22 Creighton; Paradise Jam quarterfinals	L 77–103	2–1	Sports and Fitness Center (2,223); St. Thomas, VI
11/19/2016*; 4:00 pm		vs. Montana; Paradise Jam 2nd round consolation	W 87–63	3–1	Sports and Fitness Center (1,831); St. Thomas, VI
11/21/2016*; 12:00 pm		vs. Loyola–Chicago; Paradise Jam 5th place game	L 79–88	3–2	Sports and Fitness Center (224); St. Thomas, VI
11/27/2016*; 3:00 pm, P12N		San Jose State	L 76–88	3–3	Beasley Coliseum (2,317); Pullman, WA
11/30/2016*; 7:00 pm, P12N		Utah Valley	W 83–76	4–3	Beasley Coliseum (2,314); Pullman, WA
12/03/2016*; 3:00 pm, P12N		New Orleans	L 54–70	4–4	Beasley Coliseum (2,617); Pullman, WA
12/07/2016*; 7:00 pm, P12N		Idaho; Battle of the Palouse	W 61–48	5–4	Beasley Coliseum (3,178); Pullman, WA
12/10/2016*; 3:00 pm, ESPN3		vs. Kansas State; Wildcat Classic	L 56–70	5–5	Sprint Center (8,807); Kansas City, MO
12/17/2016*; 1:00 pm, P12N		Santa Clara	W 69–68	6–5	Beasley Coliseum (2,388); Pullman, WA
12/21/2016*; 6:00 pm, P12N		Sacramento State	W 74–66	7–5	Beasley Coliseum (2,248); Pullman, WA
Pac-12 regular season
01/01/2017; 5:30 pm, ESPNU		at Washington; Rivalry	W 79–74	8–5 (1–0)	Alaska Airlines Arena (9,259); Seattle, WA
01/04/2017; 8:00 pm, P12N		vs. Oregon State	W 75–62	9–5 (2–0)	Spokane Arena (2,237); Spokane, WA
01/07/2017; 4:00 pm, P12N		No. 15 Oregon	L 66–85	9–6 (2–1)	Beasley Coliseum (3,335); Pullman, WA
01/12/2017; 8:00 pm, P12N		at Stanford	L 54–84	9–7 (2–2)	Maples Pavilion (3,491); Stanford, CA
01/14/2017; 1:00 pm, P12N		at California	L 54–58	9–8 (2–3)	Haas Pavilion (9,238); Berkeley, CA
01/18/2017; 6:00 pm, P12N		Utah	L 47–88	9–9 (2–4)	Beasley Coliseum (2,928); Pullman, WA
01/21/2017; 1:00 pm, P12N		Colorado	W 91–89 ^{OT}	10–9 (3–4)	Beasley Coliseum (2,920); Pullman, WA
01/26/2017; 6:30 pm, P12N		at No. 7 Arizona	L 62–79	10–10 (3–5)	McKale Center (14,644); Tucson, AZ
01/29/2017; 11:00 am, P12N		at Arizona State	W 91–83	11–10 (4–5)	Wells Fargo Arena (5,554); Tempe, AZ
02/01/2017; 6:00 pm, P12N		No. 11 UCLA	L 79–95	11–11 (4–6)	Beasley Coliseum (4,109); Pullman, WA
02/04/2017; 5:00 pm, P12N		USC	L 77–86	11–12 (4–7)	Beasley Coliseum (3,551); Pullman, WA
02/09/2017; 6:00 pm, P12N		at Utah	L 70–74	11–13 (4–8)	Jon M. Huntsman Center (12,800); Salt Lake City, UT
02/12/2017; 5:30 pm, ESPNU		at Colorado	L 49–81	11–14 (4–9)	Coors Events Center (7,612); Boulder, CO
02/16/2017; 6:00 pm, FS1		No. 5 Arizona	L 59–78	11–15 (4–10)	Beasley Coliseum (3,448); Pullman, WA
02/18/2017; 2:00 pm, P12N		Arizona State	W 86–71	12–15 (5–10)	Beasley Coliseum (3,344); Pullman, WA
02/25/2017; 5:30 pm, ESPNU		Washington; Rivalry	W 79–71	13–15 (6–10)	Beasley Coliseum (5,003); Pullman, WA
03/01/2017; 7:00 pm, P12N		at USC	L 64–87	13–16 (6–11)	Galen Center (3,553); Los Angeles, CA
03/04/2017; 7:15 pm, ESPN		at No. 3 UCLA	L 68–77	13–17 (6–12)	Pauley Pavilion (13,659); Los Angeles, CA
Pac-12 Tournament
03/08/2017; 6:00 pm, P12N	(10)	vs. (7) Colorado; First round	L 63–73	13–18	T-Mobile Arena (9,978); Paradise, NV
*Non-conference game. ^{#}Rankings from AP Poll. (#) Tournament seedings in parentheses. All times are in Pacific Time.
