= 2016–17 Colorado Buffaloes men's basketball team =

American college basketball season

2016–17 Colorado Buffaloes men's basketball

NIT, First Round
- Conference: Pac-12 Conference
- Record: 19–15 (8–10 Pac-12)
- Head coach: Tad Boyle (7th season)
- Assistant coaches: Jean Prioleau; Mike Rhon; Bill Grier
- Home arena: Coors Events Center

2016–17 Pac-12 Conference men's basketball standings
	Conf.				Overall
Team	W		L	PCT	W		L	PCT
No. 9 Oregon	16	–	2	.889	33	–	6	.846
No. 4 Arizona †	16	–	2	.889	32	–	5	.865
No. 8 UCLA	15	–	3	.833	31	–	5	.861
Utah	11	–	7	.611	20	–	12	.625
California	10	–	8	.556	21	–	13	.618
USC	10	–	8	.556	26	–	10	.722
Colorado	8	–	10	.444	19	–	15	.559
Arizona State	7	–	11	.389	15	–	18	.455
Stanford	6	–	12	.333	14	–	17	.452
Washington State	6	–	12	.333	13	–	18	.419
Washington	2	–	16	.111	9	–	22	.290
Oregon State	1	–	17	.056	5	–	27	.156
† Pac-12 Tournament winner Rankings from AP poll

The 2016–17 Colorado Buffaloes men's basketball team represented the University of Colorado in the 2016–17 NCAA Division I men's basketball season. They were led by head coach Tad Boyle in his seventh season at Colorado. The Buffaloes played their home games at Coors Events Center in Boulder, Colorado as members of the Pac-12 Conference. They finished the season 19–15, 8–10 in Pac-12 play to finish in seventh place. They defeated Washington State in the first round of the Pac-12 tournament to advance to the quarterfinals where they lost to Arizona. They were invited to the National Invitation Tournament where the lost in the first round to UCF.

== Previous season ==
The Buffaloes finished the 2015–16 season 22–12, 10–8 in Pac-12 play to finish in fifth place. They defeated Washington State in the first round of the Pac-12 tournament before losing to Arizona in the quarterfinals. They received an at-large bid to the NCAA tournament as a No. 8 seed in the South region where they lost to No. 9-seed Connecticut in the first round.

== Off-season ==
=== Departures ===
Name	Num	Pos.	Height	Weight	Year	Hometown	Notes
Xavier Talton	3	G	6'2"	185	Senior	Sterling, CO	Graduated
Eli Stalzer	5	G	6'3"	195	Senior	Brea, CA	Graduated
Tre'Shaun Fletcher	10	G/F	6'7"	205	Junior	Tacoma, WA	Transferred to Toledo
Kenan Guzonjic	13	F	6'8"	245	Junior	Sarajevo, Bosnia and Herzegovina	Graduate transferred to Barry
Brett Brady	22	G	6'1"	170	Senior	Highlands Ranch, CO	Graduate transferred to Colorado Christian
Josh Scott	40	F	6'10"	245	Senior	Monument, CO	Graduated

=== 2016 recruiting class ===
College recruiting
Name	Hometown	School	Height	Weight	Commit date
Deleon Brown; G	Caledonia, MI	Brewster Academy	6 ft 4 in (1.93 m)	175 lb (79 kg)	Oct 7, 2014
Deleon Brown; G	Recruit ratings: Scout: Rivals: 247Sports: ESPN: (N/A)				
Bryce Peters; G	Long Beach, CA	Damien HS	6 ft 4 in (1.93 m)	190 lb (86 kg)	Sep 14, 2015
Bryce Peters; G	Recruit ratings: Scout: Rivals: 247Sports: ESPN: (80)				
Dallas Walton; PF	Arvada, CO	Arvada West HS	7 ft 0 in (2.13 m)	225 lb (102 kg)	Feb 16, 2016
Dallas Walton; PF	Recruit ratings: Scout: Rivals: 247Sports: ESPN: (65)				
Lucas Siewert; PF	Los Angeles, CA	Cathedral HS	6 ft 9 in (2.06 m)	220 lb (100 kg)	Apr 19, 2016
Lucas Siewert; PF	Recruit ratings: Scout: Rivals: 247Sports: ESPN: (69)				
Overall recruit ranking: Scout: N/A Rivals: N/A 247Sports: N/A ESPN: N/A
Note: In many cases, Scout, Rivals, 247Sports, On3, and ESPN may conflict in their listings of height and weight.; In these cases, the average was taken. ESPN grades are on a 100-point scale.; Sources: "2016 Team Ranking". Rivals.

=== 2017 Recruiting class ===
College recruiting (2017)
Name	Hometown	School	Height	Weight	Commit date
D'Shawn Schwartz; SF	Colorado Springs, CO	Sand Creek High School	6 ft 5 in (1.96 m)	222 lb (101 kg)	Sep 10, 2016
D'Shawn Schwartz; SF	Recruit ratings: Scout: Rivals: 247Sports: ESPN: (83)				
Tyler Bey; PF	Los Angeles, CA	Middlebrooks Academy	6 ft 8 in (2.03 m)	200 lb (91 kg)	Sep 10, 2016
Tyler Bey; PF	Recruit ratings: Scout: Rivals: 247Sports: ESPN: (76)				
Evan Battey; PF	Los Angeles, CA	Villa Park High School	6 ft 6 in (1.98 m)	280 lb (130 kg)	Sep 27, 2016
Evan Battey; PF	Recruit ratings: Scout: Rivals: 247Sports: ESPN: (82)				
Overall recruit ranking:
Note: In many cases, Scout, Rivals, 247Sports, On3, and ESPN may conflict in their listings of height and weight.; In these cases, the average was taken. ESPN grades are on a 100-point scale.; Sources: "2017 Team Ranking". Rivals.

== Roster ==
2016–17 Colorado Buffaloes men's basketball team
Players
Coaches

Pos.	#	Name	Height	Weight	Year	Previous school	Hometown
G	0	Thomas Akyazali	6 ft 2 in (1.88 m)	180 lb (82 kg)	So	Koninklijk Atheneum Deurne HS	Antwerp, Belgium
F	1	Wesley Gordon	6 ft 9 in (2.06 m)	220 lb (100 kg)	RS Sr	Sierra HS	Colorado Springs, CO
G	5	Deleon Brown	6 ft 4 in (1.93 m)	175 lb (79 kg)	Fr	Brewster Academy	Grand Rapids, MI
F	10	Alexander Strating (W)	6 ft 7 in (2.01 m)	205 lb (93 kg)	Fr	American School of The Hague	Wassenaars, Netherlands
G/F	11	Xavier Johnson	6 ft 7 in (2.01 m)	225 lb (102 kg)	RS Sr	Mater Dei HS	Los Angeles, CA
G	12	Mitch Lombard (W)	6 ft 0 in (1.83 m)	183 lb (83 kg)	So	Rock Canyon HS	Castle Pines, CO
G	13	Namon Wright (redshirt)	6 ft 5 in (1.96 m)	195 lb (88 kg)	Jr	Missouri	Los Angeles, CA
F	14	Tory Miller	6 ft 9 in (2.06 m)	246 lb (112 kg)	Jr	New Hampton School	Lee's Summit, MO
G	15	Dominique Collier	6 ft 2 in (1.88 m)	190 lb (86 kg)	Jr	East HS	Denver, CO
G	21	Derrick White	6 ft 5 in (1.96 m)	193 lb (88 kg)	RS Sr	Colorado–Colorado Springs	Parker, CO
G	23	Bryce Peters	6 ft 4 in (1.93 m)	190 lb (86 kg)	Fr	Damien HS	La Puente, CA
G	24	George King	6 ft 6 in (1.98 m)	220 lb (100 kg)	RS Jr	Cathedral HS	Fayetteville, NC
F	25	Lucas Siewert	6 ft 10 in (2.08 m)	230 lb (104 kg)	RS Fr	Brennan HS	Joinville, Brazil
G	33	Josh Repine (W)	6 ft 3 in (1.91 m)	180 lb (82 kg)	Jr	New Hampton School	Englewood, CO
F/C	35	Dallas Walton	7 ft 0 in (2.13 m)	225 lb (102 kg)	Fr	Arvada West	Arvada, CO
G	44	Josh Fortune	6 ft 5 in (1.96 m)	200 lb (91 kg)	RS Sr	Providence	Hampton, VA

Head coach

- Tad Boyle (Kansas)

Assistant coach(es)

- Jean Prioleau (Fordham)
- Mike Rohn (McPherson)
- Bill Grier (Oregon)

Legend

- (C) Team captain
- (S) Suspended
- (I) Ineligible
- (W) Walk-on
- Injured
- Current redshirt

Roster

== Schedule and results ==
Date time, TV	Rank^{#}	Opponent^{#}	Result	Record	Site (attendance) city, state
Non-conference regular season
Nov. 11, 2016*; 7:00 PM, P12N		Sacramento State	W 90–53	1–0	Coors Events Center (8,322); Boulder, CO
Nov. 14, 2016*; 7:00 PM, P12N		Seattle; Legends Classic campus-site game	W 67–55	2–0	Coors Events Center (6,883); Boulder, CO
Nov. 17, 2016*; 7:00 PM, P12N		Louisiana–Monroe; Legends Classic campus-site game	W 89–70	3–0	Coors Events Center (7,329); Boulder, CO
Nov. 21, 2016*; 5:00 PM, ESPN2		vs. Notre Dame; Legends Classic semifinal	L 83–89	3–1	Barclays Center; Brooklyn, NY
Nov. 22, 2016*; 1:30 PM, ESPNU		vs. No. 22 Texas; Legends Classic 3rd place game	W 68–54	4–1	Barclays Center; Brooklyn, NY
Nov. 27, 2016*; 12:00 PM, P12N		Wofford	W 75–60	5–1	Coors Events Center (6,854); Boulder, CO
Nov. 30, 2016*; 7:00 PM, P12N		Colorado State	L 58–72	5–2	Coors Events Center (8,715); Boulder, CO
Dec. 3, 2016*; 8:00 PM		at Portland	W 76–63	6–2	Chiles Center (2,720); Portland, OR
Dec. 7, 2016*; 7:00 PM, P12N		No. 13 Xavier	W 68–66	7–2	Coors Events Center (7,743); Boulder, CO
Dec. 10, 2016*; 8:00 PM, ESPN2		at BYU	L 71–79	7–3	Marriott Center (13,664); Provo, UT
Dec. 17, 2016*; 12:00 PM, P12N		Fort Hays State	W 81–71	8–3	Coors Events Center (7,268); Boulder, CO
Dec. 19, 2016*; 7:00 PM, CBSSN		at Air Force	W 75–68	9–3	Clune Arena (3,530); Colorado Springs, CO
Dec. 22, 2016*; 6:30 PM, P12N		Eastern Washington	W 76–68	10–3	Coors Events Center (6,958); Boulder, CO
Pac-12 regular season
Jan. 1, 2017; 6:30 PM, ESPNU		at Utah	L 60–76	10–4 (0–1)	Jon M. Huntsman Center (12,108); Salt Lake City, UT
Jan. 5, 2017; 7:00 PM, P12N		at Arizona State	L 77–78	10–5 (0–2)	Wells Fargo Arena (5,147); Tempe, AZ
Jan. 7, 2017; 7:30 PM, P12N		at No. 17 Arizona	L 73–82	10–6 (0–3)	McKale Center (14,644); Tucson, AZ
Jan. 12, 2017; 9:00 PM, FS1		No. 4 UCLA	L 89–104	10–7 (0–4)	Coors Events Center (8,755); Boulder, CO
Jan. 15, 2017; 6:30 PM, ESPNU		No. 25 USC	L 68–71	10–8 (0–5)	Coors Events Center (8,036); Boulder, CO
Jan. 18, 2017; 9:00 PM, ESPNU		at Washington	L 83–85 ^{OT}	10–9 (0–6)	Alaska Airlines Arena (6,416); Seattle, WA
Jan. 21, 2017; 2:00 PM, P12N		at Washington State	L 89–91 ^{OT}	10–10 (0–7)	Beasley Coliseum (2,920); Pullman, WA
Jan. 26, 2017; 6:30 PM, FS1		Oregon State	W 85–78	11–10 (1–7)	Coors Events Center (7,341); Boulder, CO
Jan. 28, 2017; 7:30 PM, P12N		No. 10 Oregon	W 74–65	12–10 (2–7)	Coors Events Center (9,374); Boulder, CO
Feb. 2, 2017; 9:00 PM, P12N		at Stanford	W 81–74	13–10 (3–7)	Maples Pavilion (3,849); Stanford, CA
Feb. 5, 2017; 2:30 PM, ESPNU		at California	L 66–77	13–11 (3–8)	Haas Pavilion (9,719); Berkeley, CA
Feb. 9, 2017; 8:00 PM, FS1		Washington	W 81–66	14–11 (4–8)	Coors Events Center (7,387); Boulder, CO
Feb. 12, 2017; 6:30 PM, ESPNU		Washington State	W 81–49	15–11 (5–8)	Coors Events Center (7,612); Boulder, CO
Feb. 16, 2017; 7:00 PM, P12N		at Oregon State	W 60–52	16–11 (6–8)	Gill Coliseum (4,281); Corvallis, OR
Feb. 19, 2017; 1:00 PM, FOX		at No. 7 Oregon	L 73–101	16–12 (6–9)	Matthew Knight Arena (12,364); Eugene, OR
Feb. 23, 2017; 9:00 PM, ESPNU		Utah	L 81–86	16–13 (6–10)	Coors Events Center (7,142); Boulder, CO
Mar. 2, 2017; 7:00 PM, ESPN2		Stanford	W 91–72	17–13 (7–10)	Coors Events Center (8,008); Boulder, CO
Mar. 5, 2017; 12:00 PM, P12N		California	W 54–46	18–13 (8–10)	Coors Events Center (8,392); Boulder, CO
Pac-12 tournament
Mar. 8, 2017; 7:00 PM, P12N	(7)	vs. (10) Washington State; First Round	W 73–63	19–13	T-Mobile Arena (9,978); Paradise, NV
Mar. 9, 2017; 7:00 PM, P12N	(7)	vs. (2) No. 7 Arizona; Quarterfinals	L 78–92	19–14	T-Mobile Arena (18,153); Paradise, NV
NIT
Mar. 15, 2017*; 5:00 PM, ESPN3	(5)	at (4) UCF; First Round – Illinois State Bracket	L 74–79	19–15	CFE Arena (3,675); Orlando, FL
*Non-conference game. ^{#}Rankings from AP Poll. (#) Tournament seedings in parentheses. All times are in Mountain Time.
