= 2017 National Invitation Tournament =

Postseason college basketball tournament

- Season: 2016–17
- Teams: 32
- Finals site: Madison Square Garden, New York City
- Champions: TCU Horned Frogs (1st title)
- Runner-up: Georgia Tech Yellow Jackets (2nd title game)
- Semifinalists: Cal State Bakersfield Roadrunners (1st semifinal); UCF Knights (1st semifinal)
- Winning coach: Jamie Dixon (1st title)
- MVP: Kenrich Williams (TCU)

The 2017 National Invitation Tournament was a single-elimination tournament of 32 NCAA Division I teams that were not selected to participate in the 2017 NCAA tournament. The annual tournament was played on campus sites in the first three rounds (the host team being the team with the higher seeding), with the semifinals and championship game being held at Madison Square Garden in New York City. The tournament began on Tuesday, March 14 and ended on Thursday, March 30. The NIT Selection Show aired Sunday March 12 on ESPNU.

== Experimental rules ==
In February 2017, the NCAA approved a number of experimental rule changes for use in this tournament:

- Team fouls were reset to zero at the end of every 10-minute segment of each half (officially at 9:59). Similar to women's college basketball, the game was split into quarters for purposes of team fouls, but without a period break.
- There were no "one-and-one" foul shots. Instead, starting with the fifth total foul in each 10-minute segment, non-shooting fouls by the defensive team resulted in two free throws, with the only exception being administrative technical fouls. This mirrored foul counting in NCAA women's basketball, which has been played in quarters since the 2015–16 season.
- In a feature unique in the college game, but similar to that used by the (W)NBA, overtime was considered a separate period for purposes of accrued team fouls. The team foul limit was three per overtime period, with all non-shooting team fouls thereafter by the defense resulting in two free throws.
- The shot clock was reset to 20 seconds when the ball was inbounded in the frontcourt following a foul (similar to the (W)NBA and FIBA, where a shot clock is reset to 14 seconds on such).

== Participants ==
=== Automatic qualifiers ===
The following 10 teams were guaranteed berths into the 2017 NIT field when they failed to receive an at-large NCAA bid by virtue of having won their respective conference's regular season championship and failing to win their conference tournaments.

Team	Conference	Record	Appearance	Last bid
Belmont	Ohio Valley	26–6	4th	2016
Illinois State	Missouri Valley	27–6	14th	2015
Monmouth	Metro Atlantic	27–6	2nd	2016
Oakland	Horizon	24–8	1st	Never
South Dakota	Summit	22–11	1st	Never
UNC Greensboro	Southern	25–9	2nd	2002
UT Arlington	Sun Belt	25–8	3rd	2012
Akron	MAC	26–8	7th	2016
UC Irvine	Big West	21–14	6th	2014
Cal State Bakersfield	WAC	22–9	1st	Never

=== At-large bids ===
The following 22 teams were also awarded NIT berths.

Team	Conference	Record	Appearance	Last bid
Alabama	SEC	19–14	15th	2016
Boise State	Mtn West	19–11	5th	2004
BYU	WCC	22–11	13th	2016
California	Pac-12	21–12	9th	2014
Clemson	ACC	17–15	16th	2014
College of Charleston	CAA	25–9	5th	2011
Colorado	Pac-12	19–14	9th	2011
Colorado State	Mtn West	23–11	9th	2015
Fresno State	Mtn West	20–12	10th	2007
Georgia	SEC	19–14	14th	2016
Georgia Tech	ACC	17–15	9th	2016
Houston	American	21–10	11th	2016
Illinois	Big Ten	18–14	7th	2015
Indiana	Big Ten	18–15	5th	2005
Iowa	Big Ten	18–14	8th	2013
Ole Miss	SEC	20–13	12th	2012
Richmond	Atlantic 10	20–12	9th	2015
Syracuse	ACC	18–14	13th	2008
TCU	Big 12	19–15	7th	2005
UCF	American	20–11	2nd	2012
Utah	Pac-12	20–11	13th	2014
Valparaiso	Horizon	24–8	4th	2016

=== Bids by conference ===
Conference	Bids
ACC, Big Ten, Mtn West, Pac-12, SEC	3
American, Horizon	2
Atlantic 10, Big 12, Big West, CAA, MAAC, MAC, Missouri Valley, Ohio Valley, SoCon, Summit, Sun Belt, West Coast, WAC	1
America East, ASUN, Big East, Big Sky, Big South, C-USA, Ivy League, MEAC, Northeast, Patriot, Southland, SWAC	0

== Seeds ==
Syracuse bracket
Seed	School	Conference	Record	Berth type
1	Syracuse	ACC	18–14	At-large
2	Georgia	SEC	19–14	At-large
3	Indiana	Big Ten	18–15	At-large
4	Monmouth	MAAC	27–6	Automatic
5	Ole Miss	SEC	20–13	At-large
6	Georgia Tech	ACC	17–15	At-large
7	Belmont	OVC	22–6	Automatic
8	UNC Greensboro	SoCon	25–9	Automatic

Cal bracket
Seed	School	Conference	Record	Berth type
1	California	Pac-12	21–12	At-large
2	Houston	American	21–10	At-large
3	BYU	WCC	22–11	At-large
4	Colorado State	Mtn West	23–11	At-large
5	Charleston	CAA	25–9	At-large
6	UT Arlington	Sun Belt	25–8	Automatic
7	Akron	MAC	26–8	Automatic
8	Cal State Bakersfield	WAC	22–9	Automatic

Illinois State bracket
Seed	School	Conference	Record	Berth type
1	Illinois State	Missouri Valley	27–6	Automatic
2	Illinois	Big Ten	18–14	At-large
3	Utah	Pac-12	20–11	At-large
4	UCF	American	21–11	At-large
5	Colorado	Pac-12	19–14	At-large
6	Boise State	Mtn West	19–11	At-large
7	Valparaiso	Horizon	24–8	At-large
8	UC Irvine	Big West	21–14	Automatic

Iowa bracket
Seed	School	Conference	Record	Berth type
1	Iowa	Big Ten	18–14	At-large
2	Clemson	ACC	17–15	At-large
3	Alabama	SEC	19–14	At-large
4	TCU	Big 12	19–15	At-large
5	Fresno State	Mtn West	20–12	At-large
6	Richmond	Atlantic 10	20–12	At-large
7	Oakland	Horizon	24–8	Automatic
8	South Dakota	Summit	22–11	Automatic

== Schedule ==
The NIT began on Tuesday, March 14. The first three rounds were played at campus sites. The semifinals were held on Tuesday, March 28 and the championship on Thursday, March 30 at Madison Square Garden in New York City.

== Bracket ==
First round
1	Syracuse	90
8	UNC Greensboro	77
4	Monmouth	83
5	Ole Miss	91
3	Indiana^	63
6	Georgia Tech	75
2	Georgia	69
7	Belmont	78

Second round
1	Syracuse	80
5	Ole Miss	85
6	Georgia Tech	71
7	Belmont	57

Quarterfinals
5	Ole Miss	66
6	Georgia Tech	74

^ Indiana Athletic Director Fred Glass declined to host a home game at Simon Skjodt Assembly Hall citing concern it would "devalue" the Hoosiers' home court.

First round
1	California	66
8	Cal State Bakersfield	73
4	Colorado State	81
5	Charleston	74
3	BYU	89
6	UT Arlington	105
2	Houston†	75
7	Akron	78

Second round
8	Cal State Bakersfield	81
4	Colorado State	63
6	UT Arlington	85
7	Akron	69

Quarterfinals
8	Cal State Bakersfield	80
6	UT Arlington	76

† Game played at Texas Southern's Health and Physical Education Arena due to renovations at Hofheinz Pavilion.

First round
1	Illinois State	85
8	UC Irvine	71
4	UCF	79
5	Colorado	74
3	Utah	68
6	Boise State	73
2	Illinois	82
7	Valparaiso	57

Second round
1	Illinois State	62
4	UCF	63
6	Boise State	56
2	Illinois	71

Quarterfinals
4	UCF	68
2	Illinois^	58

^ Game played at UCF due to prior scheduled event at the State Farm Center.

First round
1	Iowa	87
8	South Dakota	75
4	TCU	66
5	Fresno State	59
3	Alabama	64
6	Richmond	71
2	Clemson	69
7	Oakland	74

Second round
1	Iowa	92
4	TCU	94
6	Richmond	87
7	Oakland	83

Quarterfinals
4	TCU	86
6	Richmond	68

Semifinals; March 28
6	Georgia Tech	76
8	Cal State Bakersfield	61
4	UCF	53
4	TCU	68

Final; March 30
6	Georgia Tech	56
4	TCU	88

== Media ==
ESPN, Inc. had exclusive television rights. Games were telecast on ESPN, ESPN2, ESPNU, or ESPN3. Westwood One had exclusive radio rights to the semifinals and the championship.

== See also ==
- 2017 Women's National Invitation Tournament
