= Anthony Coleman (basketball) =

American basketball player (born 1982)

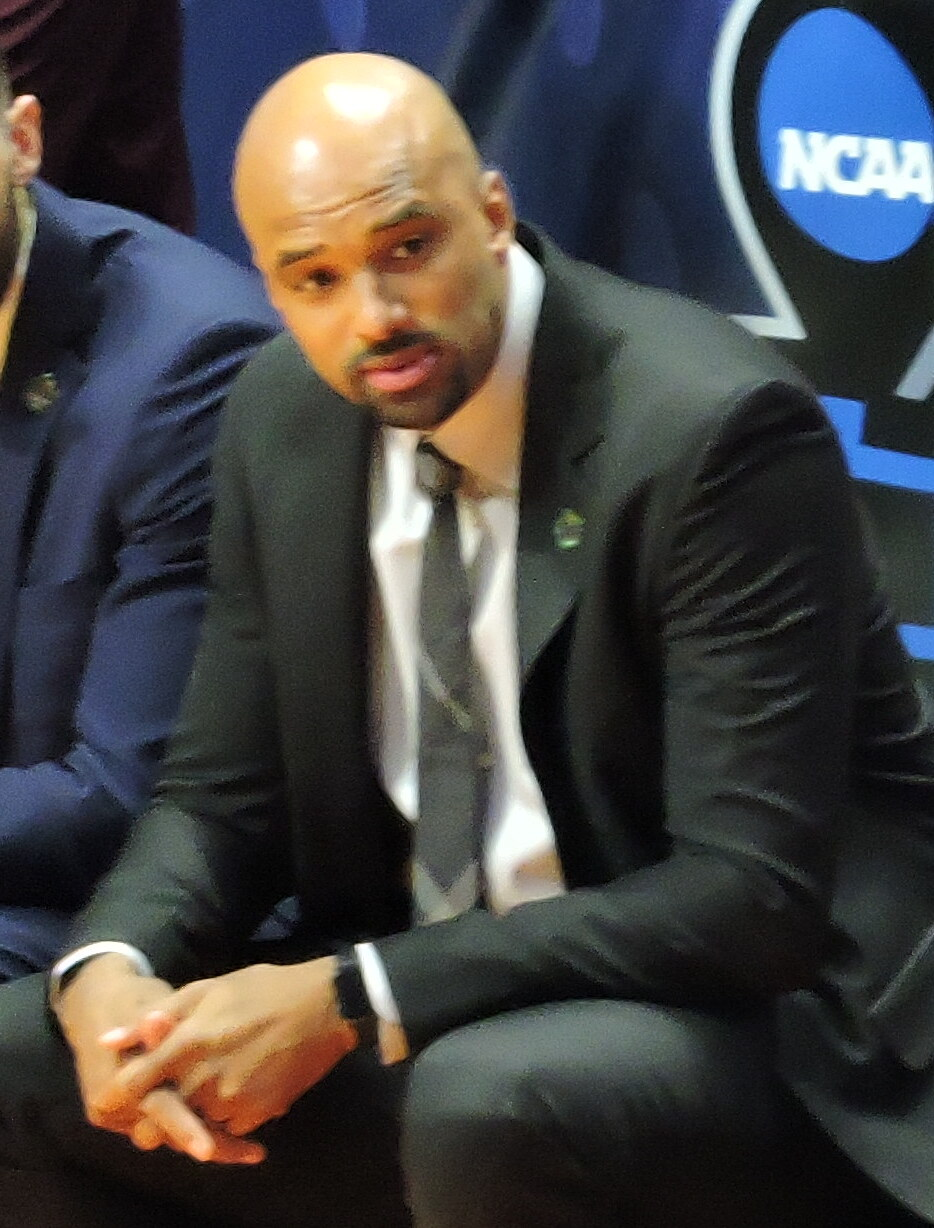
- Coleman in 2019

Colorado Buffaloes
- Position: Assistant coach
- League: Pac-12 Conference

Personal information
- Born: October 6, 1982 (age 44) Westminster, California, U.S.
- Listed height: 6 ft 11 in (2.11 m)
- Listed weight: 231 lb (105 kg)

Career information
- High school: Centennial (Compton, California)
- College: Xavier (2001–2003); Long Beach State (2003–2005)
- NBA draft: 2005: undrafted
- Playing career: 2005–2011
- Coaching career: 2016–present

Career history

Playing
- 2005–2006: Albuquerque Thunderbirds
- 2006–2007: Bakersfield Jam
- 2007–2008: Basketball Löwen Braunschweig
- 2008–2009: Los Angeles D-Fenders
- 2010–2011: Akita Northern Happinets
- 2011: Austin Knights
- 2011: Los Angeles D-Fenders

Coaching
- 2016–2019: Arizona State (assistant)
- 2019–present: Colorado (assistant)

Anthony Joseph Coleman (born October 6, 1982) is an American former professional basketball player and current assistant coach for the University of Colorado Boulder. He played professionally for the Akita Northern Happinets of the Japanese bj league. On November 11, 2010, he set his career high in points in a Japanese bj League game. That day he scored 14 points in Akita Northern Happinets's home loss against Tokyo Apache, 87–99.

He entered the coaching field as an assistant for the Arizona State Sun Devils. In 2019, he moved within the Pac-12 Conference to the Colorado Buffaloes.

== College statistics ==
Year	Team	GP	GS	MPG	FG%	3P%	FT%	RPG	APG	SPG	BPG	PPG
2001–02	Xavier											
2002–03	Xavier	5	0	6.8	.333	1.000	.000	1.00	0.00	0.20	0.40	0.06
2003–04	LBS	2	1	26.0	.278	.222	.750	7.00	2.00	1.00	1.00	7.50
2004–05	LBS	17	8	21.4	.437	.237	.643	5.00	0.65	0.18	0.82	8.24
Career		24	9	18.7	.414	.250	.652	4.33	0.62	0.25	0.75	6.58

== Career statistics ==
Legend
GP	Games played	GS	Games started	MPG	Minutes per game
FG%	Field goal percentage	3P%	3-point field goal percentage	FT%	Free throw percentage
RPG	Rebounds per game	APG	Assists per game	SPG	Steals per game
BPG	Blocks per game	PPG	Points per game	**Bold**	Career high

=== NBA Summer League Stats ===
Year	Team	GP	GS	MPG	FG%	3P%	FT%	RPG	APG	SPG	BPG	PPG
2006–07	LAC	1	0	10.0	.000	.000	1.000	1.00	0.00	0.00	0.00	2.00
2007–08	MIL	2	0	8.5	.750	.000	.000	1.50	0.50	0.50	0.50	3.00
Career		3	0	9.0	.600	.000	1.000	1.33	0.33	0.33	0.33	2.67

=== Regular season ===
Year	Team	GP	GS	MPG	FG%	3P%	FT%	RPG	APG	SPG	BPG	PPG
2005–06	Albuquerque	4		7.5	.375	.000	.000	1.8	0.5	0.0	0.3	1.5
2007–08	Braunschweig	30	1	14.9	.412	.327	.741	2.70	0.37	0.30	0.33	4.47
2008–09	LAD	9	9	31.3	.397	.000	.615	5.44	1.78	0.44	1.56	7.33
2010–11	Akita	19	11	22.7	.370	.167	.634	7.4	0.5	0.7	0.6	5.6
2011–12	LAD	6	1	5.6	.600	.000	.000	0.67	0.00	0.00	0.50	1.00
