= 2016–17 Pac-12 Conference men's basketball season =

2016–17 Pac-12 men's basketball season
- League: NCAA Division I
- Sport: Basketball
- Teams: 12
- TV partner(s): ESPN, ESPN2, ESPNU, Fox Sports 1, FOX, Pac-12 Network, CBS

Regular Season
- Season champions: Oregon; Arizona
- Runners-up: UCLA
- Season MVP: Dillon Brooks, Oregon
- Top scorer: Markelle Fultz, Washington

Tournament
- Champions: Arizona
- Runners-up: Oregon
- Finals MVP: Allonzo Trier, Arizona

Basketball seasons
- ← 15–16 17–18 →

2016–17 Pac-12 Conference men's basketball standings
	Conf.				Overall
Team	W		L	PCT	W		L	PCT
No. 9 Oregon	16	–	2	.889	33	–	6	.846
No. 4 Arizona †	16	–	2	.889	32	–	5	.865
No. 8 UCLA	15	–	3	.833	31	–	5	.861
Utah	11	–	7	.611	20	–	12	.625
California	10	–	8	.556	21	–	13	.618
USC	10	–	8	.556	26	–	10	.722
Colorado	8	–	10	.444	19	–	15	.559
Arizona State	7	–	11	.389	15	–	18	.455
Stanford	6	–	12	.333	14	–	17	.452
Washington State	6	–	12	.333	13	–	18	.419
Washington	2	–	16	.111	9	–	22	.290
Oregon State	1	–	17	.056	5	–	27	.156
† Pac-12 Tournament winner Rankings from AP poll

The 2016–17 Pac-12 Conference men's basketball season begins with practices in October 2016 and ends with the 2017 Pac-12 Conference men's basketball tournament in March 2017 at the T-Mobile Arena in Paradise, Nevada. The regular season begins on the first weekend of November 11, 2016 with Arizona-Michigan State, with the conference schedule starting in the last week of December 28, 2016 with UCLA-Oregon.

This is the sixth season under the Pac-12 Conference name and the 58th since the conference was established under its current charter as the Athletic Association of Western Universities in 1959. Including the history of the Pacific Coast Conference, which operated from 1915 to 1959 and is considered by the Pac-12 as a part of its own history, this is the Pac-12's 102nd season of men's basketball.

== Preseason ==
Pac-12 recruits at the 2016 McDonald's All-American Boys Game

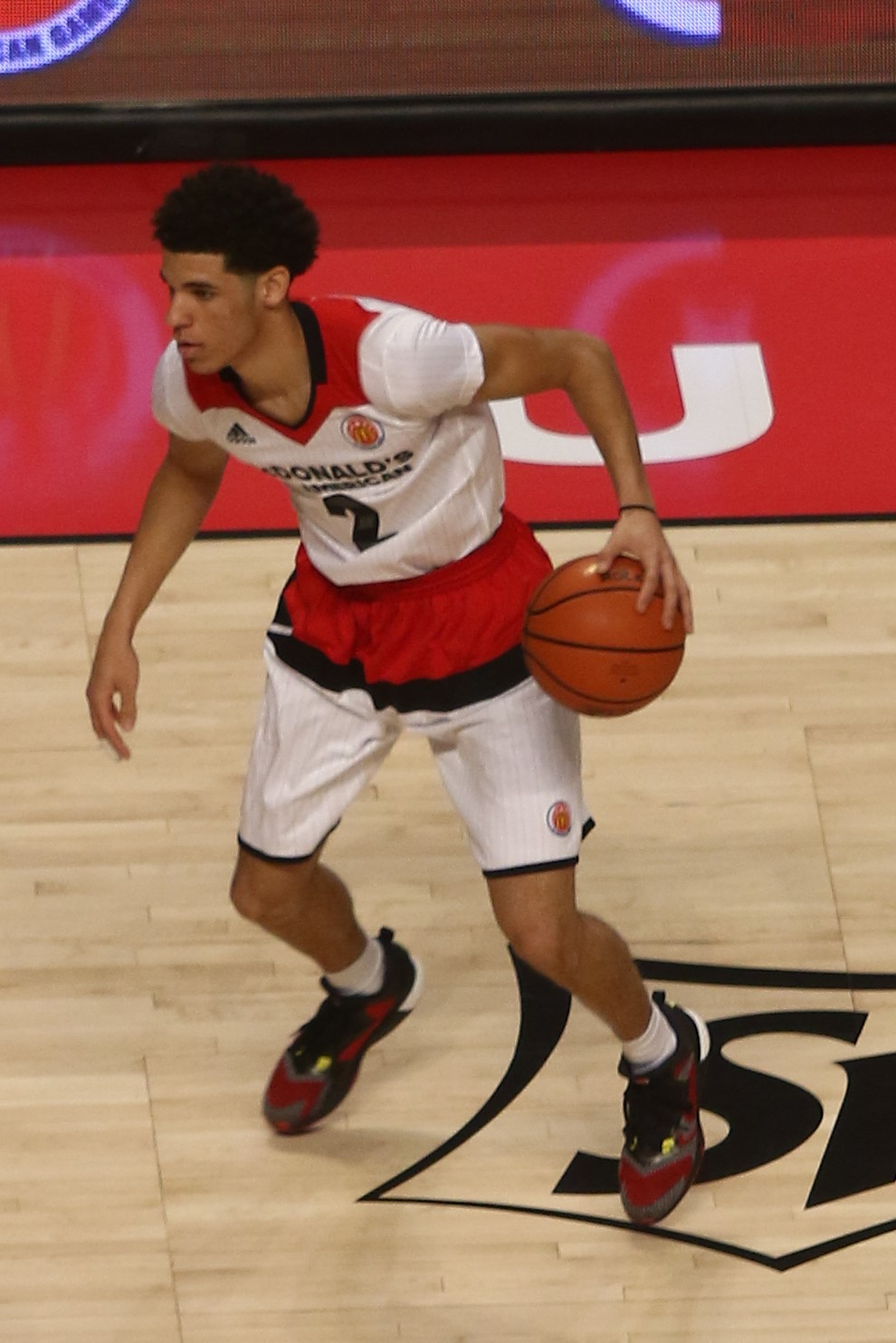
Lonzo Ball, UCLA

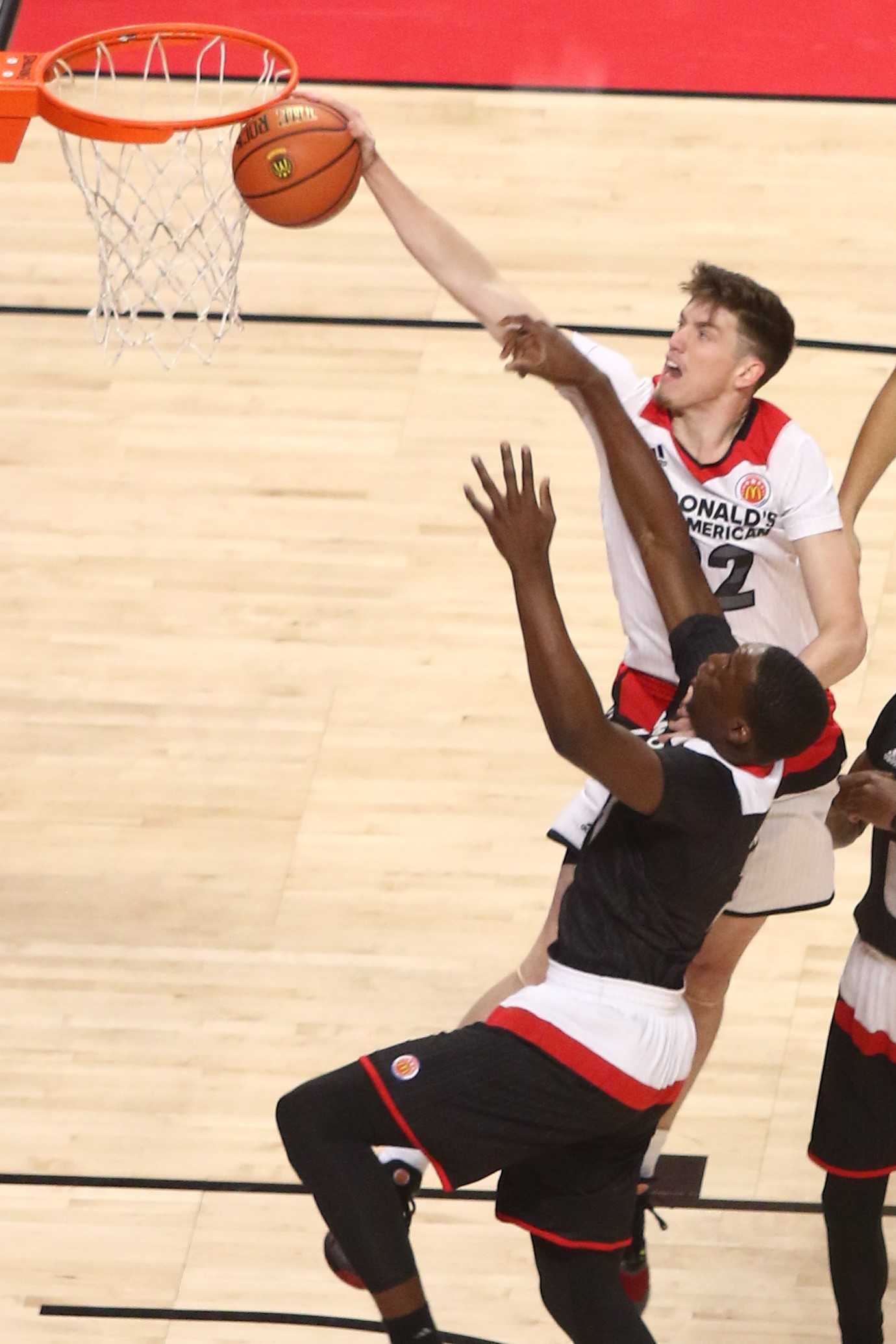
T. J. Leaf, UCLA

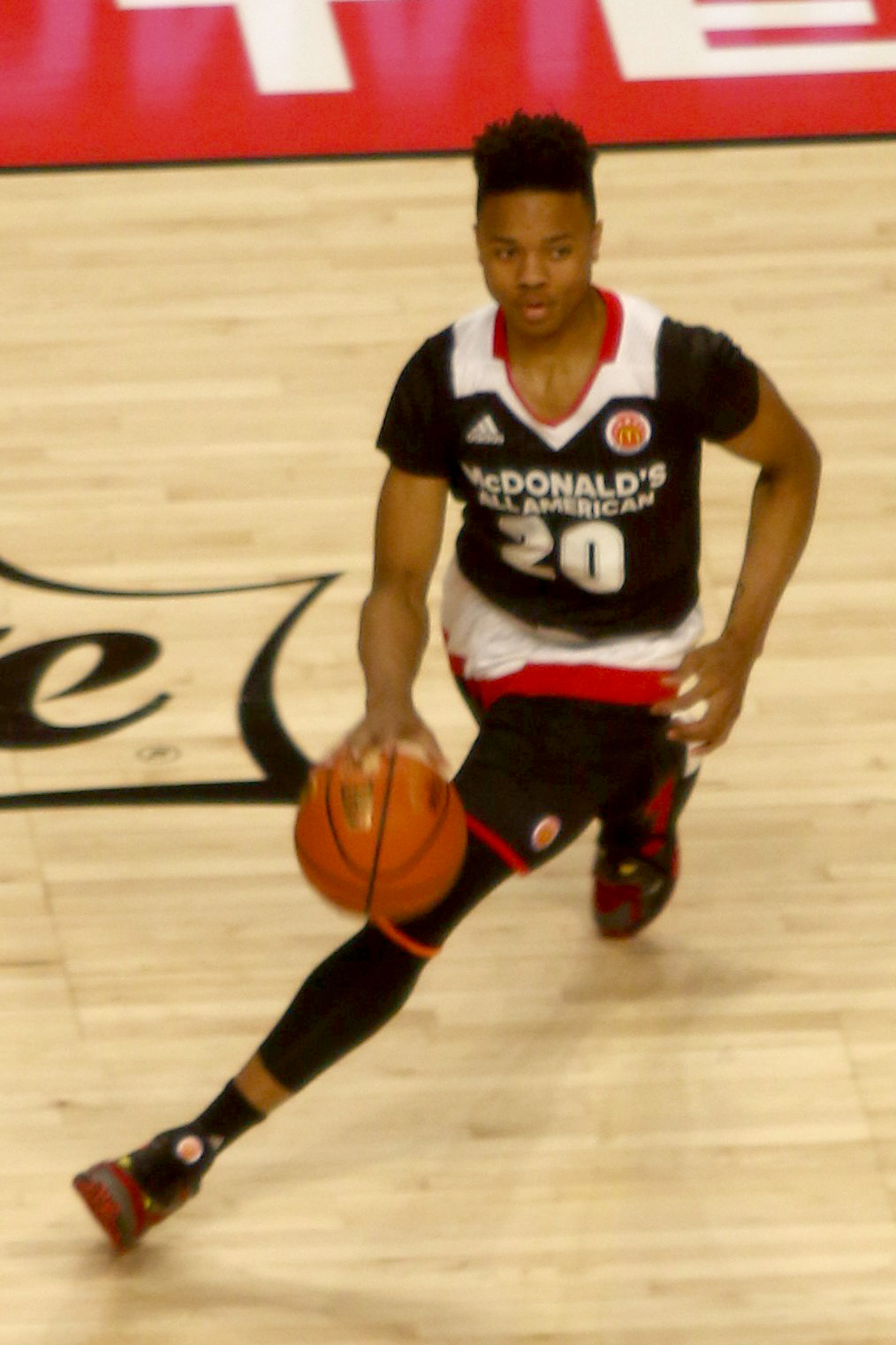
Markelle Fultz, Washington

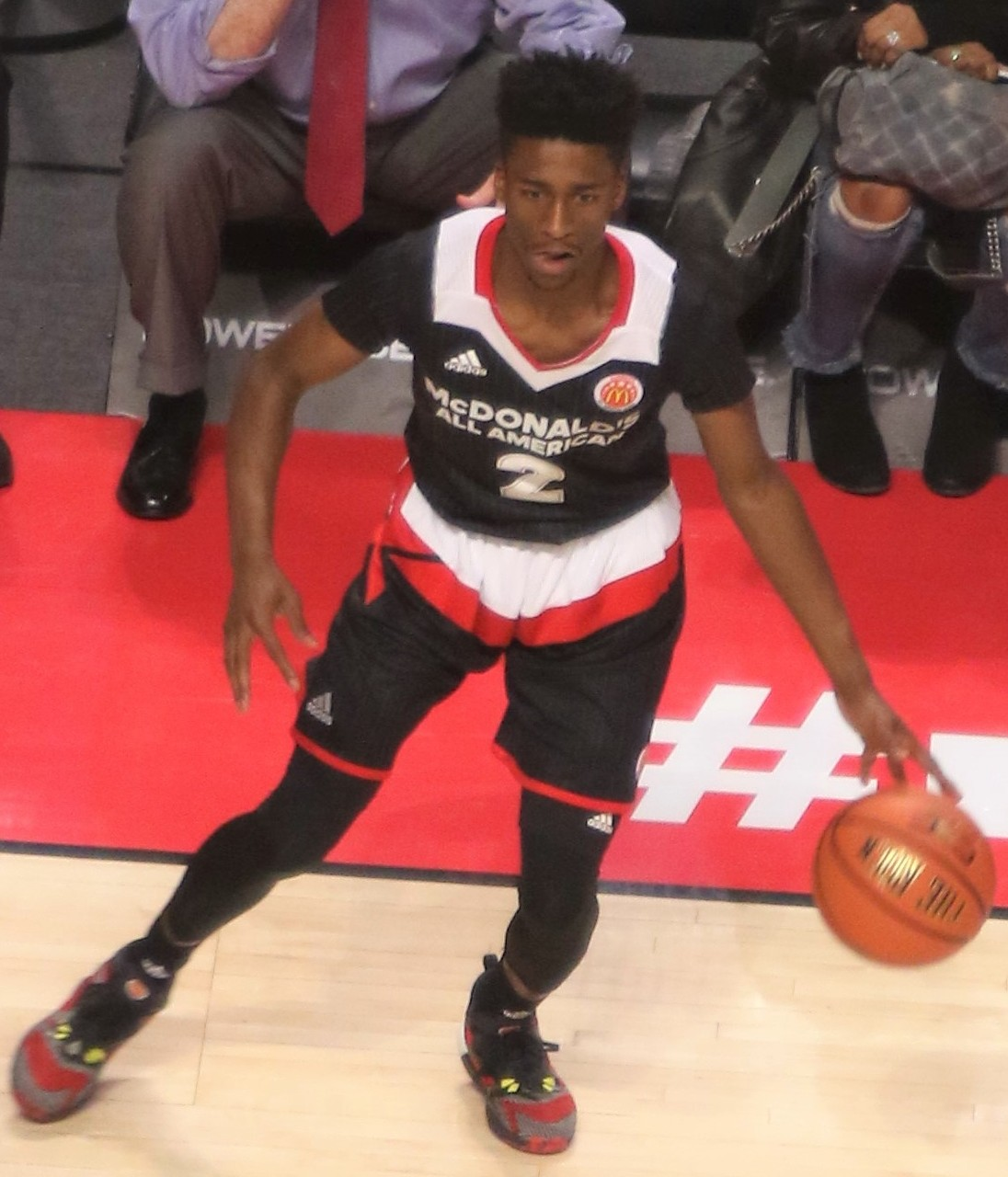
Kobi Simmons, Arizona

- October 21, 2016 – Pac-12 men's basketball media day, Pac-12 Networks Studios, San Francisco, Calif.

Men’s basketball media preseason poll
Place	Team	Points	First place votes
1.	Oregon	320	(23)
2.	Arizona	298	(4)
3.	UCLA	259	---
4.	California	209	---
5.	Colorado	199	---
6.	Washington	167	---
7.	USC	163	---
8.	Utah	142	---
9.	Oregon State	122	---
10.	Stanford	119	---
11.	Arizona State	78	---
12.	Washington State	30	---

() first place votes

=== Recruiting classes ===
Rankings
Team	ESPN	Rivals	Scout	247Sports	Signees
Arizona	#7	#3	#7	#5	3
Arizona State	#16	#21	#23	#26	4
California	-	-	-	-	1
Colorado	-	-	-	-	4
Oregon	#37	#12	#17	#20	3
Oregon State	-	-	-	-	2
Stanford	-	-	-	-	2
UCLA	#5	#5	#4	#6	3
USC	#31	-	-	-	4
Utah	-	-	-	#29	2
Washington	#32	#26	#18	#22	3
Washington State	-	-	-	-	4

== Rankings ==
The Pac-12 had 4 teams ranked and 3 others receiving votes in the preseason Coaches' Poll. It had four teams ranked in the preseason AP Poll and one other receiving votes.

Legend
	Improvement in ranking
	Drop in ranking
RV	Received votes but were not ranked in Top 25
NV	No votes received

		Pre	Wk 2	Wk 3	Wk 4	Wk 5	Wk 6	Wk 7	Wk 8	Wk 9	Wk 10	Wk 11	Wk 12	Wk 13	Wk 14	Wk 15	Wk 16	Wk 17	Wk 18	Wk 19	Final
Arizona	AP	10	10	8	16	20	19	18	18	17	16	14	7	5	9	5	4	7	7	4	NA
Arizona	C	11	9	9	15	20	19	18	18	17	16	13	9	5	10	6	4	8	7	4	7
Arizona State	AP	NV	NV	NV	NV	NV	NV	NV	NV	NV	NV	NV	NV	NV	NV	NV	NV	NV	NV	NV	NA
Arizona State	C	NV	NV	NV	NV	NV	NV	NV	NV	NV	NV	NV	NV	NV	NV	NV	NV	NV	NV	NV	NV
California	AP	RV	25	RV	RV	RV	NV	NV	NV	NV	NV	NV	NV	NV	RV	NV	NV	NV	NV	NV	NA
California	C	RV	RV	RV	RV	RV	RV	RV	RV	RV	RV	RV	NV	NV	NV	NV	RV	RV	RV	RV	NV
Colorado	AP	RV	RV	RV	RV	NV	NV	NV	NV	NV	NV	NV	NV	NV	NV	NV	NV	NV	NV	NV	NA
Colorado	C	RV	RV	RV	RV	RV	RV	RV	RV	NV	NV	NV	NV	NV	NV	NV	NV	NV	NV	NV	NV
Oregon	AP	5	4	13	23	24	22	20	21	15	13	11	10	13	5	7	6	6	5	9	NA
Oregon	C	5	4	12	20	24	22	21	21	14	11	10	10	13	6	8	7	6	5	9	3
Oregon State	AP	NV	NV	NV	NV	NV	NV	NV	NV	NV	NV	NV	NV	NV	NV	NV	NV	NV	NV	NV	NA
Oregon State	C	NV	NV	NV	NV	NV	NV	NV	NV	NV	NV	NV	NV	NV	NV	NV	NV	NV	NV	NV	NV
Stanford	AP	NV	NV	NV	NV	NV	NV	NV	NV	NV	NV	NV	NV	NV	NV	NV	NV	NV	NV	NV	NA
Stanford	C	NV	NV	NV	NV	NV	NV	NV	NV	NV	NV	NV	NV	NV	NV	NV	NV	NV	NV	NV	NV
UCLA	AP	16	16	14	11	2	2	2	2	4	4	3	8	11	10	6	5	3	3	8	NA
UCLA	C	20	16	13	9	2	2	2	2	5	4	3	7	8	9	5	5	2	3	6	9
USC	AP	NV	NV	NV	RV	RV	24	23	22	25	25	RV	RV	RV	RV	RV	RV	RV	RV	RV	NA
USC	C	RV	NV	NV	RV	RV	25	25	22	RV	25	RV	RV	RV	RV	RV	NV	RV	RV	RV	RV
Utah	AP	NV	NV	NV	NV	NV	NV	NV	NV	NV	NV	NV	RV	RV	NV	NV	NV	NV	NV	NV	NA
Utah	C	RV	RV	NV	NV	NV	NV	NV	NV	NV	NV	RV	NV	NV	NV	NV	NV	NV	NV	NV	NV
Washington	AP	RV	NV	NV	NV	NV	NV	NV	NV	NV	NV	NV	NV	NV	NV	NV	NV	NV	NV	NV	NA
Washington	C	RV	NV	NV	NV	NV	NV	NV	NV	NV	NV	NV	NV	NV	NV	NV	NV	NV	NV	NV	NV
Washington State	AP	NV	NV	NV	NV	NV	NV	NV	NV	NV	NV	NV	NV	NV	NV	NV	NV	NV	NV	NV	NA
Washington State	C	NV	NV	NV	NV	NV	NV	NV	NV	NV	NV	NV	NV	NV	NV	NV	NV	NV	NV	NV	NV

== Pac-12 regular season ==
=== Conference schedule ===
This table summarizes the head-to-head results between teams in conference play.

	Arizona	Arizona St	California	Colorado	Oregon	Oregon St	Stanford	UCLA	USC	Utah	Washington	Washington St
vs. Arizona	–	0–2	0–2	0–1	1–0	0–1	0–2	1–1	0–2	0–1	0–2	0–2
vs. Arizona State	2–0	–	2–0	0–1	1–0	0–1	0–2	2–0	1–1	1–0	0–2	2–0
vs. California	2–0	0–2	–	1–1	2–0	0–2	1–1	1–0	0–1	1–1	0–1	0–1
vs. Colorado	1–0	1–0	1–1	–	1–1	0–2	0–2	1–0	1–0	2–0	1–1	1–1
vs. Oregon	0–1	0–1	0–2	1–1	–	0–2	0–2	1–1	0–2	0–2	0–1	0–1
vs. Oregon State	1–0	1–0	2–0	2–0	2–0	–	2–0	2–0	2–0	1–1	1–0	1–0
vs. Stanford	2–0	2–0	1–1	2–0	2–0	0–2	–	1–0	1–0	1–1	0–1	0–1
vs. UCLA	1–1	0–2	0–1	0–1	1–1	0–2	0–1	–	1–1	0–1	0–2	0–2
vs. USC	2–0	1–1	1–0	0–1	2–0	0–2	0–1	1–1	–	1–0	0–2	0–2
vs. Utah	1–0	0–1	1–1	0–2	2–0	1–1	1–1	1–0	0–1	–	0–2	0–2
vs. Washington	2–0	2–0	1–0	1–1	1–0	0–1	1–0	2–0	2–0	2–0	–	2–0
vs. Washington State	2–0	0–2	1–0	1–1	1–0	0–1	1–0	2–0	2–0	2–0	0–2	–
Total	16–2	7–11	10–8	8–10	16–2	1–17	6–12	15–3	10–8	11–7	2–16	6–12

=== Points scored ===
Team	For	Against	Difference
Arizona	2332	1992	340
Arizona State	2438	2527	-89
California	1964	1874	90
Colorado	2343	2221	122
Oregon	2456	2006	450
Oregon State	1959	2254	-295
Stanford	2074	2106	-32
UCLA	2831	2326	505
USC	2445	2266	179
Utah	2368	2029	339
Washington	2295	2435	-140
Washington State	2116	2303	-187

Through March 6, 2017

== Head coaches ==
Note: Stats shown are before the beginning of the season. Overall and Pac-12 records are from time at current school.

Team	Head coach	Previous job	Seasons at school	Overall record	Pac-12 record	NCAA Tournaments	NCAA Final Fours	NCAA Championships
Arizona	Sean Miller	Xavier	8th	215–65 (.768)	107–37 (.743)	10	0	0
Arizona State	Bobby Hurley	Buffalo	2nd	30–35 (.462)	12–24 (.333)	1	0	0
California	Cuonzo Martin	Tennessee	3rd	61–37 (.622)	29–25 (.537)	2	0	0
Colorado	Tad Boyle	Northern Colorado	7th	149–94 (.613)	64–61 (.512)	4	0	0
Oregon	Dana Altman	Creighton	7th	182–68 (.728)	85–41 (.675)	12	0	0
Oregon State	Wayne Tinkle	Montana	3rd	41–54 (.432)	18–36 (.333)	4	0	0
Stanford	Jerod Haase	UAB	1st	14–17 (.452)	6–12 (.333)	0	0	0
UCLA	Steve Alford	New Mexico	4th	93–43 (.684)	44–28 (.611)	10	0	0
USC	Andy Enfield	Florida Gulf Coast	4th	68–62 (.523)	24–48 (.333)	3	0	0
Utah	Larry Krystkowiak	New Jersey Nets (assistant)	6th	115–84 (.578)	54–55 (.495)	4	0	0
Washington	Lorenzo Romar	Saint Louis	15th	298–197 (.602)	143–120 (.544)	7	0	0
Washington State	Ernie Kent	Oregon	3rd	36–58 (.383)	15–40 (.273)	6	0	0

== Postseason ==
=== Pac-12 tournament ===
The conference tournament is scheduled for Wednesday–Saturday March 8–11, 2017 at the T-Mobile Arena, Paradise, NV. Oregon and Arizona were seeded one and two respectively. The top four teams had a bye on the first day, March 8, 2017. Teams were seeded by conference record, with ties broken by record between the tied teams followed by record against the regular-season champion, if necessary.

First round Wednesday, March 8
8	Arizona State	98*
9	Stanford	88
5	California	67
12	Oregon State	62
7	Colorado	73
10	Washington State	63
6	USC	78
11	Washington	73

Quarterfinals; Thursday, March 9
1	#5 Oregon	80
8	Arizona State	57
4	Utah	75
5	California	78
2	#7 Arizona	92
7	Colorado	78
3	#3 UCLA	76
6	USC	74

Semifinals; Friday, March 10
1	#5 Oregon	73
5	California	65
2	#7 Arizona	86
3	#3 UCLA	75

Championship; Saturday, March 11
1	#5 Oregon	80
2	#7 Arizona	83

* denotes overtime period

=== NCAA tournament ===
Seed	Region	School	First Four	First round	Second round	Sweet Sixteen	Elite Eight	Final Four	Championship
No. 2	West	Arizona	Bye	No. 15 North Dakota, 100–82	No. 7 Saint Mary's, 69–60	No. 11 Xavier, 71–73			
No. 3	Midwest	Oregon	Bye	No. 14 Iona, 93–77	No. 11 Rhode Island, 75–72	No. 7 Michigan, 69–68	No. 1 Kansas, 74–60	No. 1 North Carolina, 76–77	
No. 3	South	UCLA	Bye	No. 14 Kent State, 97–80	No. 6 Cincinnati, 79–67	No. 2 Kentucky, 75–86			
No. 11	East	USC	No. 11 Providence, 75–71	No. 6 SMU, 66–65	No. 3 Baylor, 78–82				
	4 Bids	W-L (%):	1–0 1.000	4–0 1.000	3–1 .750	1–2 .333	1–0 1.000	0–1 .000	TOTAL: 10–4 .714

=== National Invitation Tournament ===
Seed	Bracket	School	First round	Second round	Quarterfinals	Semifinals	Finals
1	California	California	vs. Cal State Bakersfield, 66–73				
3	Illinois St.	Utah	vs. Boise State, 68–73				
5	Illinois St.	Colorado	at UCF, 74–79				
	3 Bids	W-L (%):	0–3 .000	0–0 –	0–0 –	0–0 –	TOTAL: 0–3 .000

Index to colors and formatting
Pac-12 member won
Pac-12 member lost

== Awards and honors ==
=== Player of the Week ===
- Nov. 14 – Tres Tinkle, Oregon State
- Nov. 21 – Charlie Moore, California
- Nov. 28 – Lonzo Ball, UCLA
- Dec. 5 – T. J. Leaf, UCLA
- Dec. 12 – Derrick White, Colorado
- Dec. 19 – T. J. Leaf, UCLA (2)
- Dec. 25 – Jordan McLaughlin, USC
- Jan. 2 – Dillon Brooks, Oregon
- Jan. 9 – Ivan Rabb, California
- Jan. 16 – Bryce Alford, UCLA
- Jan. 23 – Lauri Markkanen, Arizona
- Jan. 30 – Shaqquan Aaron, USC
- Feb. 6 – Dillon Brooks, Oregon (2)
- Feb. 13 – Lonzo Ball, UCLA (2)
- Feb. 20 – Lauri Markkanen, Arizona (2)
- Feb. 27 – Dillon Brooks, Oregon (3)
- Mar. 6 – Jordan McLaughlin, USC (2)

=== All-Americans ===
AP

First team

- Lonzo Ball (UCLA)

Second team

- Dillon Brooks (Oregon)

Third team

- Markelle Fultz (Washington)
- Lauri Markkanen (Arizona)
USBWA

First team

- Lonzo Ball (UCLA)

Second team

- Dillon Brooks (Oregon)

USBWA: Wayman Tisdale Freshman of the Year

- Lonzo Ball (UCLA)
NABC

First team

- Lonzo Ball (UCLA)

Second team

- Dillon Brooks (Oregon)

Third team

- Markelle Fultz (Washington)
- Lauri Markkanen (Arizona)
Sporting News

First team

- Lonzo Ball (UCLA)

Second team

- Dillon Brooks (Oregon)

Third team

- Lauri Markkanen (Arizona)
- Markelle Fultz (Washington)

=== All-District ===
NABC

District 20 first team

- Lonzo Ball (UCLA)
- Dillon Brooks (Oregon)
- Markelle Fultz (Washington)
- Lauri Markkanen (Arizona)
- Ivan Rabb (California)

District 20 second team

- T. J. Leaf (UCLA)
- Kyle Kuzma (Utah)
- Reid Travis (Stanford)
- Josh Hawkinson (Washington State)
- Derrick White (Colorado)

USBWA

District VIII: All-District Team

- Kyle Kuzma (Utah)
- Derrick White (Colorado)

District IX: Player of the Year

- Lonzo Ball (UCLA)

District IX: All-District Team

- Lonzo Ball (UCLA)
- Jordan Bell (Oregon)
- Dillon Brooks (Oregon)
- Markelle Fultz (Washington)
- T. J. Leaf (UCLA)
- Lauri Markkanen (Arizona)
- Ivan Rabb (California)

=== Conference awards ===
Voting was by conference coaches.

==== Individual awards ====
Pac-12 individual awards
Award	Recipient(s)
Player of The Year	Dillon Brooks, junior, Oregon
Coach of the Year	Sean Miller, Arizona
Defensive Player of The Year	Jordan Bell, junior, Oregon
Freshman of The Year	Lonzo Ball, freshman, UCLA
Scholar-Athlete of the Year	Josh Hawkinson, senior, Washington State
Most Improved Player of The Year	Chimezie Metu, sophomore, USC

==== All-Pac-12 ====
First Team

Name	School	Pos.	Yr.	Ht., wt.	Hometown (last school)
Bryce Alford	UCLA	G	Sr.	6-3, 185	Albuquerque, N.M. (La Cueva HS)
Lonzo Ball	UCLA	G	Fr.	6-6, 190	Chino Hills, Calif. (Chino Hills HS)
Dillon Brooks	Oregon	F	Jr.	6-7, 225	Mississauga, Ontario (Findlay Prep (Nev.))
Markelle Fultz	Washington	G	Fr.	6-4, 195	Upper Marlboro, Md. (DeMatha Catholic HS)
Kyle Kuzma	Utah	F	Jr.	6-9, 221	Flint, Mich. (Bentley HS)
T. J. Leaf	UCLA	F	Fr.	6-10, 225	El Cajon, Calif. (Foothills Christian HS)
Lauri Markkanen	Arizona	F	Fr.	7-0, 230	Jyväskylä, Finland (Helsinki Academy)
Ivan Rabb	California	F	So.	6-11, 220	Oakland, Calif. (Bishop O'Dowd HS)
Reid Travis	Stanford	F	RS So.	6-8, 245	Minneapolis, Minn. (DeLaSalle HS)
Derrick White	Colorado	G	RS Sr.	6-5, 200	Parker, Colo. (UCCS)

Second Team

Name	School	Pos.	Yr.	Ht., wt.
Kadeem Allen	Arizona	G	R-Sr.	6-3, 205
Jordan Bell	Oregon	F	Jr.	6-9, 225
Josh Hawkinson	Washington State	F	Sr.	6-10, 230
Chimezie Metu	USC	F	So.	6-11, 225
Allonzo Trier	Arizona	G	So.	6-5, 205

==== All-Freshman Team ====
Name	School	Pos.	Ht., wt.
Rawle Alkins	Arizona	G	6-5, 220
Lonzo Ball	UCLA	G	6-6, 190
Markelle Fultz	Washington	G	6-4, 195
T. J. Leaf	UCLA	F	6-10, 225
Lauri Markkanen	Arizona	F	7-0, 230

==== All-Defensive Team ====
Name	School	Pos.	Yr.	Ht., wt.
Kadeem Allen	Arizona	G	R-Sr.	6-3, 205
Marcus Allen	Stanford	G	Sr.	6-3, 190
Jordan Bell	Oregon	F	Jr.	6-9, 225
Chris Boucher	Oregon	F	Sr.	6-10, 200
Derrick White	Colorado	G	Sr.	6-5, 200

== NBA draft ==
Round	Pick	Player	Position	Nationality	Team	School/club team
1	1	Markelle Fultz	PG	United States	Philadelphia 76ers (from Brooklyn via Boston)	Washington (Fr.)
1	2	Lonzo Ball	PG	United States	Los Angeles Lakers	UCLA (Fr.)
1	7	Lauri Markkanen	PF	Finland	Minnesota Timberwolves (traded to Chicago)	Arizona (Fr.)
1	18	T. J. Leaf	PF	United States	Indiana Pacers	UCLA (Fr.)
1	27	Kyle Kuzma	PF	United States	Los Angeles Lakers (from Boston via Brooklyn)	Utah (Jr.)
1	29	Derrick White	PG	United States	San Antonio Spurs	Colorado (Sr.)
2	35	Ivan Rabb	PF	United States	Orlando Magic (traded to Memphis Grizzles)	California (So.)
2	38	Jordan Bell	PF	United States	Chicago Bulls (from Sacramento via Cleveland)	Oregon (Jr.)
2	41	Tyler Dorsey	SG	United States	Atlanta Hawks	Oregon (Jr.)
2	45	Dillon Brooks	SF	United States	Houston Rockets (traded to Memphis Grizzles)	Oregon (Jr.)
2	47	Ike Anigbogu	C	United States	Indiana Pacers	UCLA (Fr.)
2	53	Kadeem Allen	PG	United States	Boston Celtics	Arizona (Sr.)
2	56	Jabari Bird	SG	United States	Boston Celtics	California (Sr.)
