= 2016–17 UCLA Bruins men's basketball team =

American college basketball season

2016–17 UCLA Bruins men's basketball

Wooden Legacy champions

NCAA tournament, Sweet Sixteen
- Conference: Pac-12 Conference

Ranking
- Coaches: No. 9
- AP: No. 8
- Record: 31–5 (15–3 Pac-12)
- Head coach: Steve Alford (4th season)
- Assistant coaches: Ed Schilling; Duane Broussard; David Grace
- Home arena: Pauley Pavilion

2016–17 Pac-12 Conference men's basketball standings
	Conf.				Overall
Team	W		L	PCT	W		L	PCT
No. 9 Oregon	16	–	2	.889	33	–	6	.846
No. 4 Arizona †	16	–	2	.889	32	–	5	.865
No. 8 UCLA	15	–	3	.833	31	–	5	.861
Utah	11	–	7	.611	20	–	12	.625
California	10	–	8	.556	21	–	13	.618
USC	10	–	8	.556	26	–	10	.722
Colorado	8	–	10	.444	19	–	15	.559
Arizona State	7	–	11	.389	15	–	18	.455
Stanford	6	–	12	.333	14	–	17	.452
Washington State	6	–	12	.333	13	–	18	.419
Washington	2	–	16	.111	9	–	22	.290
Oregon State	1	–	17	.056	5	–	27	.156
† Pac-12 Tournament winner Rankings from AP poll

The 2016–17 UCLA Bruins men's basketball team represented the University of California, Los Angeles during the 2016–17 NCAA Division I men's basketball season. The Bruins were led by fourth-year head coach Steve Alford and played their home games at Pauley Pavilion as members in the Pac-12 Conference. They rode their offense to a 28–3 regular season record, averaging 91 points per game with a 53 percent field goal percentage. The talented squad featured five future players in the National Basketball Association (NBA), including three eventual first-round draft picks.

UCLA entered the season ranked No. 16 in the preseason. After starting 13–0, the first time they were undefeated in non-conference play since they won a national championship in 1994–95, they moved up to No. 2 in the country. However, the Bruins suffered their first defeat in an 89–87 loss to No. 21 Oregon in the conference opener. UCLA won their next six games before losing at home to No. 14 Arizona for their first loss of the season at Pauley Pavilion. The Wildcats exposed the Bruins weaknesses on defense, which had to that point been obscured by their potent offense. They suffered their second consecutive defeat after falling to USC, who won for the fourth straight time in their crosstown rivalry. They won their last nine games of the regular season to tie the school record for most regular season wins.

The Bruins struggled uncharacteristically with their offense during the Pac-12 tournament. They beat USC 76–74 while shooting just 41.2 percent before shooting a season-low 40.7 percent in an 86–75 loss to Arizona in the semifinals. UCLA entered the NCAA tournament as a third seed in the South region. They advanced to the Sweet Sixteen for the third time in four years, where they lost 86–75 to Kentucky.

== Previous season ==
The Bruins finished the season 15–17 overall; and 6–12 in the conference. During the season, the Bruins were invited and participated in the Maui Invitational in Maui, Hawaii. UCLA defeated Cal Poly and UNLV but lost against Kansas and Wake Forest to earn 4th place. UCLA also lost to North Carolina in the CBS Sports Classic in Brooklyn, New York. In the postseason, the Bruins lost to USC in the first round of the 2016 Pac-12 Conference men's basketball tournament in Paradise, Nevada.

== Off-season ==
=== Departures ===
Name	Pos.	Height	Weight	Year	Hometown	Notes
Tony Parker	F/C	6'9"	260	Senior	Atlanta, GA	Graduated
Noah Allen	G/F	6'7"	215	Junior	Pacific Grove, CA	Graduated; Transferred to Hawaii.
Jonah Bolden	G/F	6'10"	220	Sophomore	Sydney, AU	Elected to play professionally in Serbia.

=== 2016 recruiting class ===
Recruits at the 2016 McDonald's All-American Boys Game

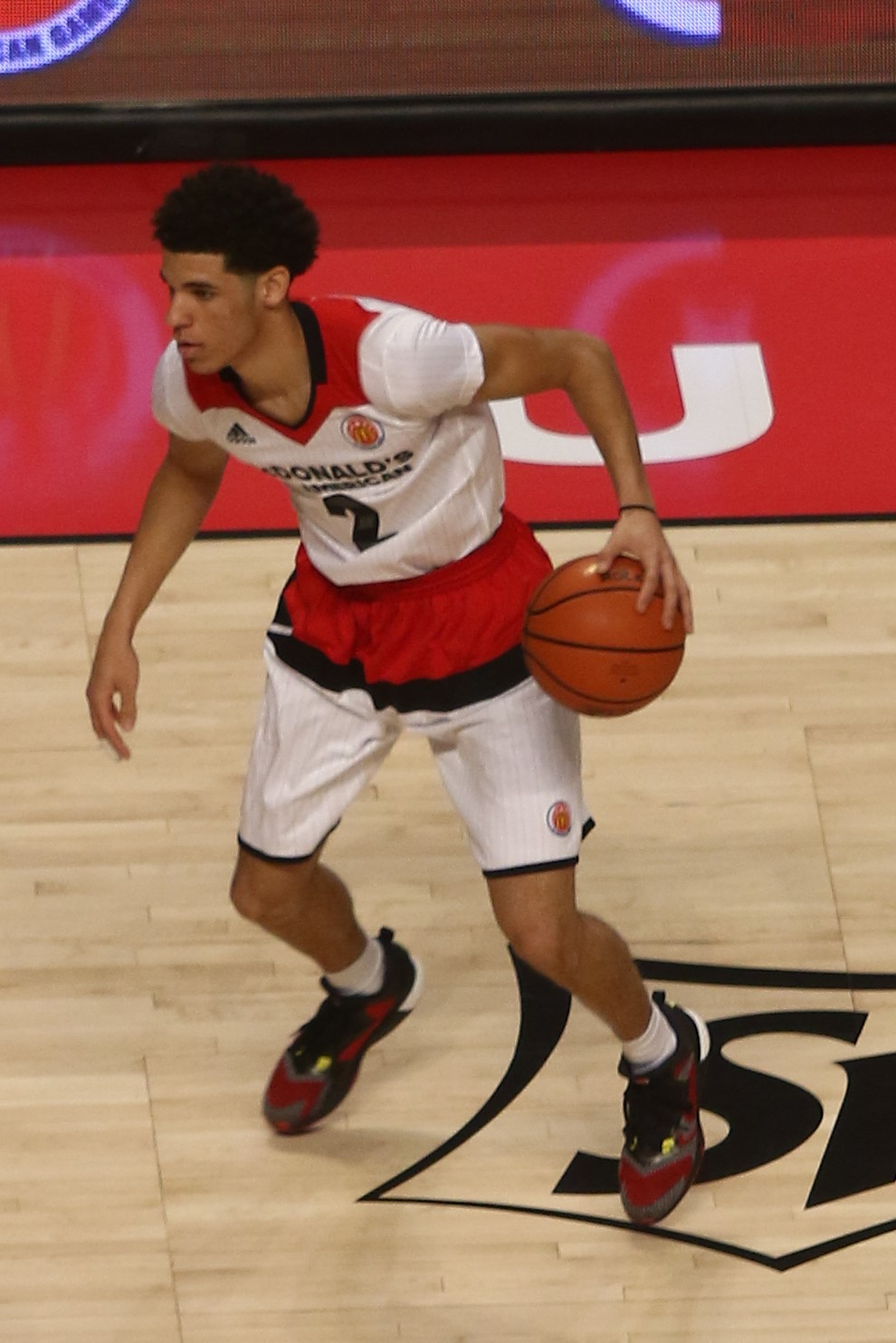
Lonzo Ball

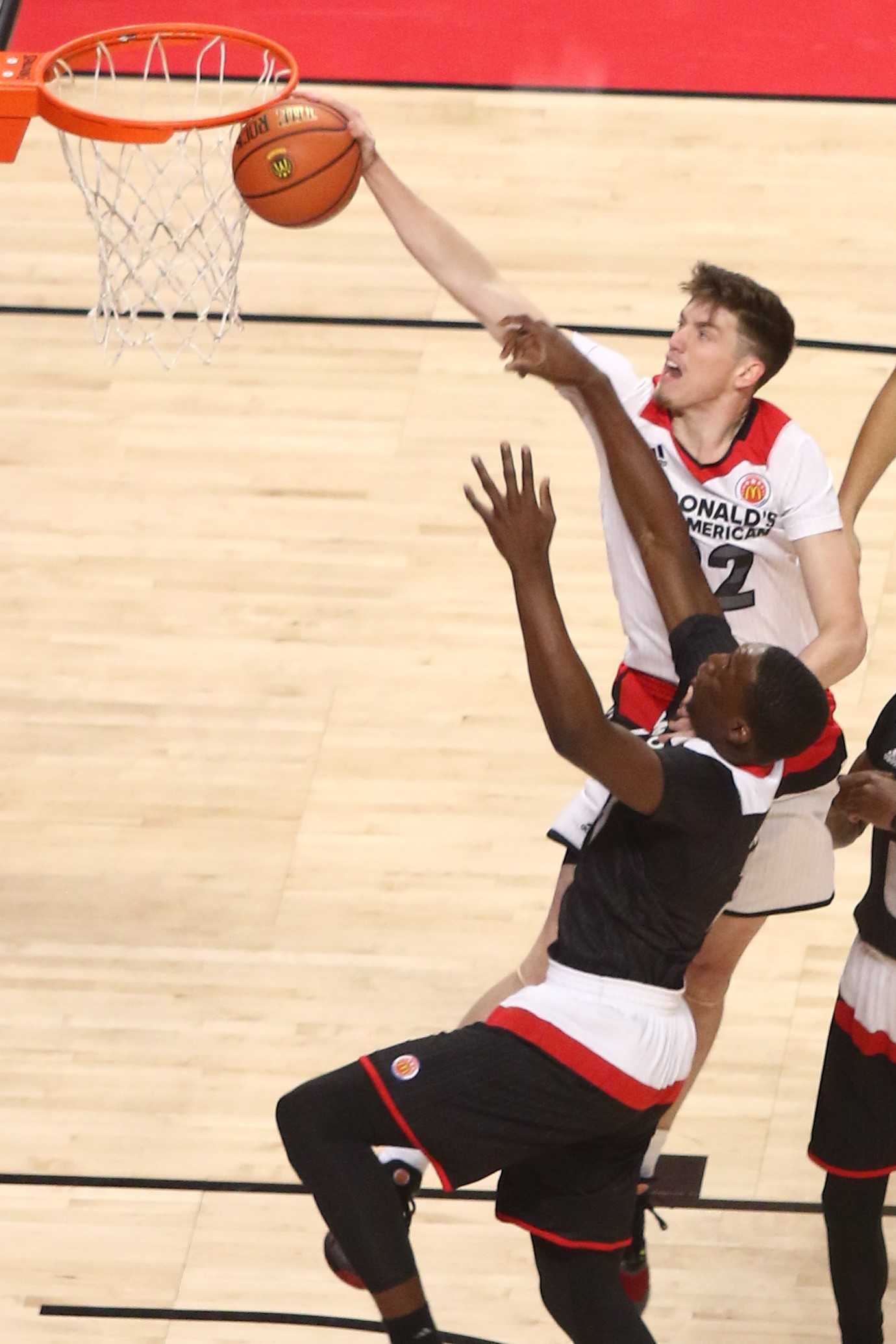
T. J. Leaf

College recruiting information
Name	Hometown	School	Height	Weight	Commit date
Lonzo Ball; PG	Chino Hills, CA	Chino Hills High School	6 ft 6 in (1.98 m)	185 lb (84 kg)	Jan 8, 2014
Lonzo Ball; PG	Recruit ratings: Scout: Rivals: 247Sports: ESPN: (96)				
Ike Anigbogu; C	Corona, CA	Centennial High School	6 ft 9 in (2.06 m)	230 lb (100 kg)	Apr 30, 2015
Ike Anigbogu; C	Recruit ratings: Scout: Rivals: 247Sports: ESPN: (84)				
T. J. Leaf; PF	El Cajon, CA	Foothills Christian High School	6 ft 10 in (2.08 m)	210 lb (95 kg)	Nov 12, 2015
T. J. Leaf; PF	Recruit ratings: Scout: Rivals: 247Sports: ESPN: (94)				
Overall recruit ranking: Scout: 11 Rivals: 5 ESPN: 5
Note: In many cases, Scout, Rivals, 247Sports, On3, and ESPN may conflict in their listings of height and weight.; In these cases, the average was taken. ESPN grades are on a 100-point scale.; Sources: "2016 UCLA Basketball Commitment List". Rivals.; "2016 UCLA Player Commits". ESPN.; "2016 Team Ranking". Rivals.

== Roster ==
2016–17 UCLA Bruins men's basketball team
Players
Coaches

Pos.	#	Name	Height	Weight	Year	Previous school	Hometown
F	0	Alex Olesinski (redshirt)	6 ft 10 in (2.08 m)	200 lb (91 kg)	So	La Lumiere School	Roswell, New Mexico
G	2	Lonzo Ball	6 ft 6 in (1.98 m)	190 lb (86 kg)	Fr	Chino Hills HS	Chino Hills, California
G	3	Aaron Holiday	6 ft 1 in (1.85 m)	185 lb (84 kg)	So	Campbell Hall School	North Hollywood, California
G	4	Isaac Wulff (W)	6 ft 3 in (1.91 m)	175 lb (79 kg)	Fr	Laguna Beach HS	Laguna Beach, California
G	5	Armani Dodson (W)	6 ft 5 in (1.96 m)	190 lb (86 kg)	Fr	Henry J. Kaiser HS	Fontana, California
G	10	Isaac Hamilton	6 ft 5 in (1.96 m)	195 lb (88 kg)	Sr	St. John Bosco HS	Los Angeles, California
F/C	13	Ike Anigbogu	6 ft 10 in (2.08 m)	250 lb (113 kg)	Fr	Centennial HS	Corona, California
F	14	György Golomán	6 ft 11 in (2.11 m)	215 lb (98 kg)	Jr	The Sagemont School	Körmend, Hungary
G	15	Jerrold Smith (W)	6 ft 0 in (1.83 m)	165 lb (75 kg)	Sr	St. Bernard HS	Los Angeles, California
G	20	Bryce Alford	6 ft 3 in (1.91 m)	185 lb (84 kg)	Sr	La Cueva HS	Albuquerque, New Mexico
G	21	Alec Wulff (W)	6 ft 3 in (1.91 m)	185 lb (84 kg)	Jr	Laguna Beach HS	Laguna Beach, California
F	22	T. J. Leaf	6 ft 10 in (2.08 m)	225 lb (102 kg)	Fr	Foothills Christian HS	El Cajon, California
G	23	Prince Ali (redshirt)	6 ft 3 in (1.91 m)	190 lb (86 kg)	So	Sagemont School	Pembroke Pines, Florida
C	34	Ikenna Okwarabizie	6 ft 9 in (2.06 m)	250 lb (113 kg)	Jr	Tyler Junior College	Lagos, Nigeria
C	40	Thomas Welsh	7 ft 0 in (2.13 m)	245 lb (111 kg)	Jr	Loyola HS	Redondo Beach, California

Head coach

- Steve Alford (Indiana)

Assistant coach(es)

- Ed Schilling (Miami (OH))
- Duane Broussard (Bradley)
- David Grace (Park)

Legend

- (C) Team captain
- (S) Suspended
- (I) Ineligible
- (W) Walk-on
- Injured
- Current redshirt

Roster
Last update: July 26, 2016

- Guard Prince Ali out since July with a torn meniscus. In early January, Ali decided to redshirt for the 2016–17 season.
- Forward Alex Olesinski out since early November with left foot injury. In early January, Olesinski decided to redshirt for the 2016–17 season.
- Oct 25, 2016 – Forward/Center Ike Anigbogu out 4–6 weeks with torn meniscus in right knee. Made return at Nov. 25 game against Nebraska.

== Schedule ==
Date time, TV	Rank^{#}	Opponent^{#}	Result	Record	High points	High rebounds	High assists	Site (attendance) city, state
Australia Tour
Aug. 23, 2016*; 2:30 a.m.		Sydney	W 123–76		21 – Leaf	10 – Holiday	9 – Tied	Brydens Stadium; Sydney, NSW
Aug. 27, 2016*; 2:00 a.m.		Melbourne United	L 84–89		18 – Tied	13 – Ball	5 – Hamilton	State Basketball Centre; Melbourne, VIC
Aug. 29, 2016*; 2:00 a.m.		Brisbane Bullets	W 94–91		17 – Holiday	11 – Welsh	7 – Ball	Logan Metro Indoor Sports Centre; Brisbane, QLD
Exhibition
Nov. 1, 2016*; 7:30 p.m., P12N	No. 16	Master's	W 100–58	–	22 – Alford	12 – Leaf	6 – Ball	Pauley Pavilion (5,339); Los Angeles, CA
Non-conference regular season
Nov. 11, 2016*; 6:00 p.m., P12N	No. 16	Pacific	W 119–80	1–0	30 – Alford	15 – Leaf	11 – Ball	Pauley Pavilion (8,743); Los Angeles, CA
Nov. 13, 2016*; 6:00 p.m., P12N	No. 16	Cal State Northridge	W 102–87	2–0	22 – Hamilton	13 – Welsh	6 – Ball	Pauley Pavilion (7,149); Los Angeles, CA
Nov. 17, 2016*; 8:00 p.m., P12N	No. 16	San Diego	W 88–68	3–0	26 – Leaf	11 – Welsh	8 – Ball	Pauley Pavilion (6,893); Los Angeles, CA
Nov. 20, 2016*; 7:00 p.m., P12N	No. 16	Long Beach State	W 114–77	4–0	21 – Leaf	10 – Leaf	11 – Ball	Pauley Pavilion (8,294); Los Angeles, CA
Nov. 24, 2016*; 8:00 p.m., ESPN2	No. 14	vs. Portland; Wooden Legacy quarterfinal	W 99–77	5–0	18 – Ball	10 – Welsh	11 – Ball	Titan Gym (3,816); Fullerton, CA
Nov. 25, 2016*; 9:00 p.m., ESPN2	No. 14	vs. Nebraska; Wooden Legacy semifinal	W 82–71	6–0	18 – Alford	11 – Welsh	6 – Ball	Titan Gym (5,153); Fullerton, CA
Nov. 27, 2016*; 5:30 p.m., ESPN	No. 14	vs. Texas A&M; Wooden Legacy championship	W 74–67	7–0	17 – Hamilton	9 – Leaf	10 – Ball	Honda Center (4,221); Anaheim, CA
Nov. 30, 2016*; 8:00 p.m., P12N	No. 11	UC Riverside	W 97–57	8–0	27 – Hamilton	12 – Welsh	13 – Ball	Pauley Pavilion (6,328); Los Angeles, CA
Dec. 3, 2016*; 10:30 a.m., CBS	No. 11	at No. 1 Kentucky	W 97–92	9–0	19 – Hamilton	13 – Leaf	7 – Ball	Rupp Arena (23,976); Lexington, KY
Dec. 10, 2016*; 5:00 p.m., ESPN2	No. 2	Michigan	W 102–84	10–0	21 – Leaf	8 – Leaf	7 – Hamilton	Pauley Pavilion (13,571); Los Angeles, CA
Dec. 14, 2016*; 7:30 p.m., P12N	No. 2	UC Santa Barbara	W 102–62	11–0	25 – Leaf	10 – Tied	9 – Leaf	Pauley Pavilion (7,484); Los Angeles, CA
Dec. 17, 2016*; 12:00 p.m., CBS	No. 2	vs. Ohio State; CBS Sports Classic	W 86–73	12–0	20 – Tied	9 – Ball	9 – Ball	T-Mobile Arena (19,298); Paradise, NV
Dec. 21, 2016*; 8:00 p.m., P12N	No. 2	Western Michigan	W 82–68	13–0	22 – Alford	8 – Tied	7 – Holiday	Pauley Pavilion (10,695); Los Angeles, CA
Pac-12 regular season
Dec. 28, 2016; 6:00 p.m., ESPN2	No. 2	at No. 21 Oregon	L 87–89	13–1 (0–1)	20 – Tied	10 – Welsh	7 – Holiday	Matthew Knight Arena (12,364); Eugene, OR
Dec. 30, 2016; 8:00 p.m., P12N	No. 2	at Oregon State	W 76–63	14–1 (1–1)	23 – Ball	10 – Leaf	7 – Ball	Gill Coliseum (5,596); Corvallis, OR
Jan. 5, 2017; 6:00 p.m., ESPN	No. 4	California	W 81–71	15–1 (2–1)	24 – Alford	11 – Leaf	7 – Ball	Pauley Pavilion (13,659); Los Angeles, CA
Jan. 8, 2017; 5:00 p.m., FS1	No. 4	Stanford	W 89–75	16–1 (3–1)	21 – Ball	10 – Leaf	8 – Ball	Pauley Pavilion (13,659); Los Angeles, CA
Jan. 12, 2017; 8:00 p.m., FS1	No. 4	at Colorado	W 104–89	17–1 (4–1)	37 – Alford	6 – Welsh	8 – Ball	Coors Events Center (8,755); Boulder, CO
Jan. 14, 2017; 3:00 p.m., P12N	No. 4	at Utah	W 83–82	18–1 (5–1)	17 – Ball	10 – Leaf	8 – Ball	Jon M. Huntsman Center (15,027); Salt Lake City, UT
Jan. 19, 2017; 8:00 p.m., FS1	No. 3	Arizona State	W 102–80	19–1 (6–1)	33 – Hamilton	9 – Tied	12 – Ball	Pauley Pavilion (12,689); Los Angeles, CA
Jan. 21, 2017; 1:00 p.m., CBS	No. 3	No. 14 Arizona; Rivalry	L 85–96	19–2 (6–2)	24 – Ball	9 – Welsh	8 – Ball	Pauley Pavilion (13,659); Los Angeles, CA
Jan. 25, 2017; 8:00 p.m., FS1	No. 8	at USC; Rivalry	L 76–84	19–3 (6–3)	20 – Hamilton	10 – Ball	4 – Tied	Galen Center (10,258); Los Angeles, CA
Feb. 1, 2017; 6:00 p.m., P12N	No. 11	at Washington State	W 95–79	20–3 (7–3)	32 – Leaf	14 – Leaf	7 – Ball	Beasley Coliseum (4,109); Pullman, WA
Feb. 4, 2017; 7:30 p.m., P12N	No. 11	at Washington	W 107–66	21–3 (8–3)	22 – Ball	10 – Leaf	5 – Tied	Alaska Airlines Arena (10,000); Seattle, WA
Feb. 9, 2017; 7:00 p.m., ESPN	No. 10	No. 5 Oregon; Dick Enberg Day	W 82–79	22–3 (9–3)	15 – Tied	11 – Ball	4 – Alford	Pauley Pavilion (13,659); Los Angeles, CA
Feb. 12, 2017; 2:00 p.m., FS1	No. 10	Oregon State	W 78–60	23–3 (10–3)	22 – Ball	9 – Tied	9 – Ball	Pauley Pavilion (12,649); Los Angeles, CA
Feb. 18, 2017; 7:00 p.m., P12N	No. 6	USC; Rivalry	W 102–70	24–3 (11–3)	26 – Alford	16 – Welsh	8 – Ball	Pauley Pavilion (13,659); Los Angeles, CA
Feb. 23, 2017; 6:00 p.m., ESPN2	No. 5	at Arizona State	W 87–75	25–3 (12–3)	25 – Leaf	11 – Tied	6 – Tied	Wells Fargo Arena (10,176); Tempe, AZ
Feb. 25, 2017; 5:15 p.m., ESPN	No. 5	at No. 4 Arizona; Rivalry/ESPN College GameDay	W 77–72	26–3 (13–3)	15 – Alford	8 – Welsh	8 – Ball	McKale Center (14,644); Tucson, AZ
Mar. 1, 2017; 8:00 p.m., FS1	No. 3	Washington	W 98–66	27–3 (14–3)	29 – Alford	7 – Tied	8 – Ball	Pauley Pavilion (13,659); Los Angeles, CA
Mar. 4, 2017; 7:15 p.m., ESPN	No. 3	Washington State	W 77–68	28–3 (15–3)	16 – Holiday	11 – Welsh	14 – Ball	Pauley Pavilion (13,659); Los Angeles, CA
Pac-12 Tournament
Mar. 9, 2017; 8:30 p.m., ESPN	(3) No. 3	vs. (6) USC; Quarterfinals	W 76–74	29–3	22 – Hamilton	11 – Welsh	7 – Ball	T-Mobile Arena (18,153); Paradise, NV
Mar. 10, 2017; 8:30 p.m., ESPN	(3) No. 3	vs. (2) No. 7 Arizona; Semifinals	L 75–86	29–4	20 – Hamilton	8 – Tied	6 – Ball	T-Mobile Arena (19,224); Paradise, NV
NCAA Tournament
Mar. 17, 2017*; 6:57 pm, truTV	(3 S) No. 8	vs. (14 S) Kent State; First Round	W 97–80	30–4	23 – Leaf	8 – Welsh	11 – Holiday	Golden 1 Center (16,514); Sacramento, CA
Mar. 19, 2017*; 6:40 pm, TBS	(3 S) No. 8	vs. (6 S) No. 18 Cincinnati; Second Round	W 79–67	31–4	18 – Ball	7 – Tied	9 – Ball	Golden 1 Center (16,774); Sacramento, CA
Mar. 24, 2017*; 6:40 pm, CBS	(3 S) No. 8	vs. (2 S) No. 5 Kentucky; Sweet Sixteen	L 75–86	31–5	17 – Leaf	7 – Leaf	8 – Ball	FedExForum (17,532); Memphis, TN
*Non-conference game. ^{#}Rankings from AP Poll. (#) Tournament seedings in parentheses. S=South Region. All times are in Pacific Time.

== Rankings ==
Ranking movements Legend: ██ Increase in ranking ██ Decrease in ranking ( ) = First-place votes
	Week																			
Poll	Pre	1	2	3	4	5	6	7	8	9	10	11	12	13	14	15	16	17	18	Final
AP	16	16	14	11	2 (2)	2 (3)	2 (3)	2 (3)	4	4 (1)	3 (3)	8	11	10	6	5	3 (3)	3 (3)	8	Not released
Coaches	20	16	13	9	2 (1)	2 (2)	2 (2)	2 (2)	5	4	3 (2)	7	8	9	5	5	2 (3)	3 (2)	6	9

*AP does not release post-NCAA tournament rankings

== Player statistics ==
Player	GP	GS	MPG	FGM-FGA	3PM-3PA	FTM-FTA	RPG	APG	SPG	BPG	PPG
Bryce Alford	36	36	33.0	173–387	116–270	96–117	2.5	2.6	0.5	0.1	15.5
Prince Ali	0	0	0.0	0–0	0–0	0–0	0.0	0.0	0.0	0.0	0.0
Ike Anigbogu	29	0	13.0	57–101	0–0	23–43	4.0	0.2	0.2	1.2	4.7
Lonzo Ball	36	36	35.1	189–343	80–194	66–98	6.0	7.6	1.8	0.8	14.6
György Golomán	35	5	11.5	54–93	1–10	21–33	2.4	0.7	0.6	0.8	3.7
Isaac Hamilton	36	36	30.0	193–426	74–202	47–57	3.6	2.8	0.7	0.2	14.1
Aaron Holiday	36	0	26.4	150–309	53–129	88–111	2.9	4.4	1.1	0.2	12.3
T. J. Leaf	35	35	29.9	235–381	27–58	72–106	8.2	2.4	0.6	1.1	16.3
Ikenna Okwarabizie	12	0	2.6	0–2	0–0	2–6	0.6	0.0	0.1	0.0	0.2
Alex Olesinski	0	0	0.0	0–0	0–0	0–0	0.0	0.0	0.0	0.0	0.0
Jerrold Smith	13	0	1.9	3–11	0–2	1–2	0.0	0.1	0.2	0.0	0.5
Thomas Welsh	32	32	25.1	151–258	1–1	42–47	8.7	1.0	0.3	1.3	10.8
Alec Wulff	13	0	1.8	2–6	2–6	0–0	0.1	0.1	0.1	0.0	0.5
Isaac Wulff	5	0	2.0	2–2	0–0	1–2	0.4	0.0	0.0	0.0	1.0

== See also ==
- List of UCLA Bruins in the NBA

== Notes ==
- Dec. 21, 2016 – First time a UCLA team went undefeated in non-conference play since the 1994–95 season
- March 24, 2017 – Ball told reporters after the Regional semi-final game that he will not return next season to play for the Bruins

== Honors ==
=== Preseason award watchlists ===
- Lonzo Ball – Bob Cousy Award Watchlist
- Isaac Hamilton – Jerry West Award Watchlist
- T. J. Leaf – Karl Malone Award Watchlist
- Thomas Welsh – Kareem Abdul-Jabbar Award Watchlist

=== Midseason awards ===
- Lonzo Ball – Wooden Legacy MVP (Nov. 27)
- Lonzo Ball – Pac-12 Player of the Week (Nov. 28)
- T. J. Leaf – Pac-12 Player of the Week (Dec. 5)
- T. J. Leaf – Pac-12 Player of the Week (Dec. 19)
- Bryce Alford – Pac-12 Player of the Week (Jan. 16)
- Lonzo Ball – Pac-12 Player of the Week (Feb. 13)

=== Postseason awards ===
- Lonzo Ball - Unanimous first-team All-American
- First-team All-Pac-12: Bryce Alford, Lonzo Ball and T. J. Leaf
- Lonzo Ball - Wayman Tisdale Award
