= Tej leaf =

Tej leaf may refer to:

- T. J. Leaf, American basketball player
- Tejpatta or Bay leaf, aromatic leaf used for cooking
