= 2016–17 Oregon Ducks men's basketball team =

American college basketball season

2016–17 Oregon Ducks men's basketball

Pac-12 regular season co-champions

NCAA tournament, Final Four
- Conference: Pac-12 Conference

Ranking
- Coaches: No. 3
- AP: No. 9
- Record: 33–6 (16–2 Pac-12)
- Head coach: Dana Altman (7th season)
- Assistant coaches: Kevin McKenna; Tony Stubblefield; Mike Mennenga
- Home arena: Matthew Knight Arena

2016–17 Pac-12 Conference men's basketball standings
	Conf.				Overall
Team	W		L	PCT	W		L	PCT
No. 9 Oregon	16	–	2	.889	33	–	6	.846
No. 4 Arizona †	16	–	2	.889	32	–	5	.865
No. 8 UCLA	15	–	3	.833	31	–	5	.861
Utah	11	–	7	.611	20	–	12	.625
California	10	–	8	.556	21	–	13	.618
USC	10	–	8	.556	26	–	10	.722
Colorado	8	–	10	.444	19	–	15	.559
Arizona State	7	–	11	.389	15	–	18	.455
Stanford	6	–	12	.333	14	–	17	.452
Washington State	6	–	12	.333	13	–	18	.419
Washington	2	–	16	.111	9	–	22	.290
Oregon State	1	–	17	.056	5	–	27	.156
† Pac-12 Tournament winner Rankings from AP poll

The 2016–17 Oregon Ducks men's basketball team represented the University of Oregon during the 2016–17 NCAA Division I men's basketball season. The Ducks were led by seventh year head coach Dana Altman. They played their home games at Matthew Knight Arena as members of the Pac–12 Conference. They finished the season 33–6, 16–2 in Pac-12 play to win a share of the regular season Pac-12 championship. They defeated Arizona State and California in the Pac-12 tournament before losing in the final to Arizona. They received an at-large bid to the NCAA tournament where they defeated Iona, Rhode Island, Michigan, and Kansas to advance to the Final Four, marking the longest span between appearances in NCAA history (78 years), where they lost to the eventual champions North Carolina.

== Previous season ==
The Ducks finished the 2015–16 season 31–7, 14–4 in Pac-12 play to win the regular season conference championship. As the No. 1 seed in the Pac–12 Tournament, the Ducks defeated Washington, Arizona, and Utah to win the Pac-12 Tournament championship and earn the conference's automatic bid to the NCAA tournament. As a No. 1 seed in the West Region, they defeated Holy Cross, Saint Joseph's, and Duke to advance to the Elite Eight. There they lost to Oklahoma.

== Off-season ==
=== Departures ===
Name	Pos.	Height	Weight	Year	Hometown	Notes
Elgin Cook	F	6'6"	205	RS Senior	Milwaukee, WI	Graduated
Max Heller	G	5'11"	170	RS Senior	Del Mar, CA	Graduated
Dwayne Benjamin	F	6'7"	210	Senior	Lafayette, LA	Graduated
Kendall Small	G	6'0"	175	Freshman	Anaheim, CA	Transferred to Pacific

=== Incoming transfers ===
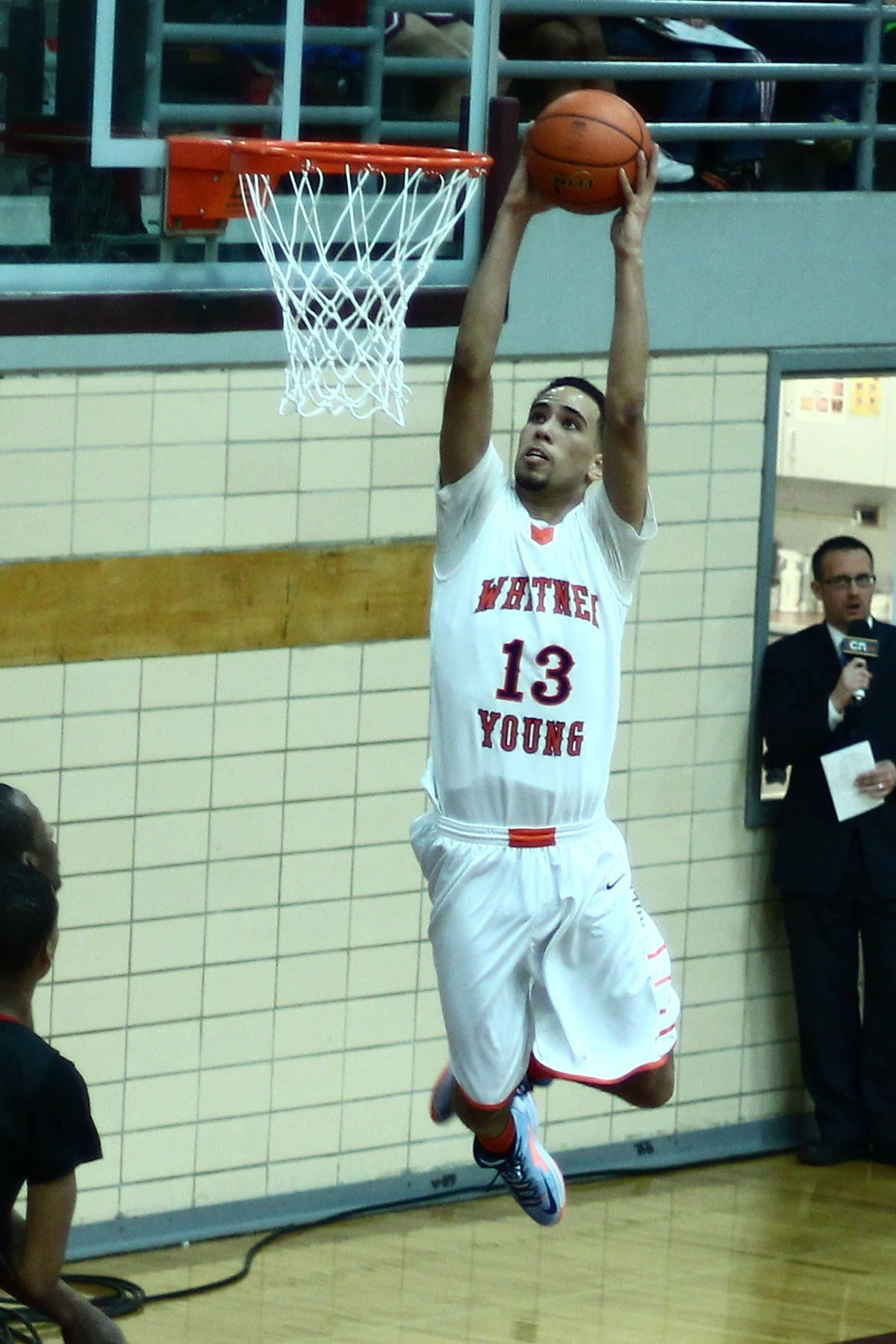
Oregon transfer Paul White in 2013 Class 4A Illinois High School Association playoffs

Name	Pos.	Height	Weight	Year	Hometown	Notes
Kavell Bigby-Williams	PF	6'10"	225	Jr.	London, England	Junior college transfer from Gillette College
Paul White	PF	6'9"	235	Jr.	Chicago, Illinois	Transfer from Georgetown. Will have to redshirt for the 2016–17 season per NCAA transfer rules, and have two seasons eligibility.

=== 2016 recruiting class ===
College recruiting
Name	Hometown	School	Height	Weight	Commit date
Keith Smith; SF	Seattle, WA	Rainier Beach HS	6 ft 7 in (2.01 m)	190 lb (86 kg)	Apr 24, 2015
Keith Smith; SF	Recruit ratings: Scout: Rivals: 247Sports: ESPN: (78)				
Payton Pritchard; PG	West Linn, OR	West Linn HS	6 ft 1 in (1.85 m)	180 lb (82 kg)	Aug 28, 2015
Payton Pritchard; PG	Recruit ratings: Scout: Rivals: 247Sports: ESPN: (85)				
M. J. Cage; PF	Santa Ana, CA	Mater Dei HS	6 ft 9 in (2.06 m)	210 lb (95 kg)	Sep 26, 2015
M. J. Cage; PF	Recruit ratings: Scout: Rivals: 247Sports: ESPN: (77)				
Overall recruit ranking:
Note: In many cases, Scout, Rivals, 247Sports, On3, and ESPN may conflict in their listings of height and weight.; In these cases, the average was taken. ESPN grades are on a 100-point scale.; Sources: "2016 Player Commits". ESPN.; "2016 Team Ranking". Rivals.

=== 2017 Recruiting class ===
College recruiting (2017)
Name	Hometown	School	Height	Weight	Commit date
Victor Bailey Jr. G	Austin, TX	McNeil HS	6 ft 3 in (1.91 m)	170 lb (77 kg)	Oct 11, 2016
Victor Bailey Jr. G	Recruit ratings: Scout: Rivals: 247Sports: ESPN: (82)				
Abu Kigab; SF	St. Catharines, ON	Prolific Prep	6 ft 6.5 in (1.99 m)	200 lb (91 kg)	Oct 14, 2016
Abu Kigab; SF	Recruit ratings: Scout: Rivals: 247Sports: ESPN: (81)				
Troy Brown Jr. G/F	Las Vegas, NV	Centennial HS	6 ft 6.5 in (1.99 m)	205 lb (93 kg)	Nov 7, 2016
Troy Brown Jr. G/F	Recruit ratings: Scout: Rivals: 247Sports: ESPN: (93)				
Kenny Wooten; PF	Manteca, CA	Trinity International (NV)	6 ft 8 in (2.03 m)	205 lb (93 kg)	Apr 24, 2017
Kenny Wooten; PF	Recruit ratings: Scout: Rivals: 247Sports: ESPN: (80)				
Overall recruit ranking:
Note: In many cases, Scout, Rivals, 247Sports, On3, and ESPN may conflict in their listings of height and weight.; In these cases, the average was taken. ESPN grades are on a 100-point scale.; Sources: "Oregon 2017 Basketball Commitments". Rivals.; "2017 Oregon Ducks Recruiting Class". ESPN.; "2017 Team Ranking". Rivals.

== Roster ==
2016–17 Oregon Ducks men's basketball team
Players
Coaches

Pos.	#	Name	Height	Weight	Year	Previous school	Hometown
F	1	Jordan Bell	6 ft 9 in (2.06 m)	225 lb (102 kg)	Jr	Long Beach Poly HS	Long Beach, California
G	2	Casey Benson	6 ft 3 in (1.91 m)	185 lb (84 kg)	Jr	Corona del Sol HS	Tempe, Arizona
G	3	Payton Pritchard	6 ft 2 in (1.88 m)	200 lb (91 kg)	Fr	West Linn HS	West Linn, Oregon
F	4	M. J. Cage (redshirt)	6 ft 10 in (2.08 m)	225 lb (102 kg)	Fr	Mater Dei HS	Santa Ana, California
G	5	Tyler Dorsey	6 ft 4 in (1.93 m)	195 lb (88 kg)	So	Maranatha HS	Los Angeles, California
G	10	Charlie Noebel (W)	6 ft 2 in (1.88 m)	178 lb (81 kg)	Sr	Mater Dei HS	Irvine, California
F	11	Keith Smith	6 ft 7 in (2.01 m)	205 lb (93 kg)	Fr	Rainier Beach HS	Seattle, Washington
F	13	Paul White (redshirt)	6 ft 9 in (2.06 m)	235 lb (107 kg)	Jr	Georgetown	Chicago, Illinois
G	21	Evan Gross (W)	5 ft 10 in (1.78 m)	165 lb (75 kg)	Jr	Oak Ridge HS	Sacramento, California
F	24	Dillon Brooks	6 ft 7 in (2.01 m)	225 lb (102 kg)	Jr	Findlay Prep	Mississauga, Ontario
F	25	Chris Boucher (injured) (C)	6 ft 10 in (2.08 m)	200 lb (91 kg)	Sr	Northwest College	Montreal, Quebec
G	31	Dylan Ennis	6 ft 2 in (1.88 m)	195 lb (88 kg)	GS	Villanova	Brampton, Ontario
F	35	Kavell Bigby-Williams	6 ft 11 in (2.11 m)	230 lb (104 kg)	Jr	Gillette College	London, England
F	41	Roman Sorkin	6 ft 10 in (2.08 m)	225 lb (102 kg)	Jr	Hof HaSharon HS	Ashdod, Israel

Head coach

- Dana Altman (Eastern New Mexico)

Assistant coach(es)

- Kevin McKenna (Creighton)
- Tony Stubblefield (Omaha)
- Mike Mennenga (Morehead State)

Legend

- (C) Team captain
- (S) Suspended
- (I) Ineligible
- (W) Walk-on
- Injured
- Current redshirt

Roster

== Schedule and results ==
Date time, TV	Rank^{#}	Opponent^{#}	Result	Record	High points	High rebounds	High assists	Site (attendance) city, state
Exhibition
Nov. 7, 2016*; 7:00 PM, P12N	No. 5	Northwest Christian	W 86–51	–	25 – Boucher	9 – Boucher	5 – Pritchard	Matthew Knight Arena (7,090); Eugene, OR
Non-conference regular season
Nov. 11, 2016*; 8:00 PM, P12N	No. 5	Army; Maui on the Mainland	W 91–77	1–0	21 – Dorsey	8 – Tied	4 – Pritchard	Matthew Knight Arena (12,364); Eugene, OR
Nov. 15, 2016*; 12:30 PM, ESPN2	No. 4	at Baylor; College Hoops Tip-Off Marathon	L 49–66	1–1	16 – Ennis	11 – Bell	4 – Benson	Ferrell Center (5,891); Waco, TX
Nov. 17, 2016*; 6:00 PM, P12N	No. 4	Valparaiso	W 76–54	2–1	25 – Boucher	9 – Boucher	5 – Pritchard	Matthew Knight Arena (7,509); Eugene, OR
Nov. 21, 2016*; 2:00 PM, ESPN2	No. 13	vs. Georgetown; Maui Invitational quarterfinal	L 61–65	2–2	18 – Pritchard	13 – Boucher	4 – Ennis	Lahaina Civic Center (2,400); Maui, HI
Nov. 22, 2016*; 11:30 AM, ESPN2	No. 13	vs. Tennessee; Maui Invitational 2nd round consolation	W 69–65 ^{OT}	3–2	17 – Brooks	9 – Bell	4 – Ennis	Lahaina Civic Center (2,400); Maui, Hi
Nov. 23, 2016*; 1:30 PM, ESPN2	No. 13	vs. UConn; Maui Invitational 5th place game	W 79–69	4–2	21 – Boucher	8 – Tied	6 – Ennis	Lahaina Civic Center (2,400); Maui, HI
Nov. 28, 2016*; 8:00 PM, P12N	No. 23	Boise State	W 68–63	5–2	18 – Ennis	8 – Boucher	3 – Bell	Matthew Knight Arena (6,824); Eugene, OR
Nov. 30, 2016*; 7:00 PM, P12N	No. 23	Western Oregon	W 93–54	6–2	21 – Brooks	12 – Bell	5 – Pritchard	Matthew Knight Arena (6,138); Eugene, OR
Dec. 3, 2016*; 3:00 PM, P12N	No. 23	Savannah State	W 128–59	7–2	29 – Dorsey	11 – Bigby-Williams	13 – Pritchard	Matthew Knight Arena (6,447); Eugene, OR
Dec. 11, 2016*; 3:00 PM, ESPNU	No. 24	Alabama	W 65–56	8–2	19 – Dorsey	4 – Boucher	6 – Brooks	Matthew Knight Arena (8,922); Eugene, OR
Dec. 13, 2016*; 7:00 PM, P12N	No. 22	Montana	W 81–67	9–2	23 – Boucher	19 – Boucher	4 – Tied	Matthew Knight Arena (6,689); Eugene, OR
Dec. 17, 2016*; 8:00 PM, ESPN2	No. 22	vs. UNLV; Portland Showcase	W 83–66	10–2	20 – Brooks	12 – Bell	5 – Ennis	Moda Center (9,728); Portland, OR
Dec. 20, 2016*; 8:00 PM, P12N	No. 20	Fresno State	W 75–63	11–2	23 – Bell	8 – Bell	5 – Benson	Matthew Knight Arena (7,169); Eugene, OR
Pac-12 regular season
Dec. 28, 2016; 6:00 PM, ESPN2	No. 21	No. 2 UCLA	W 89–87	12–2 (1–0)	23 – Brooks	9 – Brooks	9 – Pritchard	Matthew Knight Arena (12,364); Eugene, OR
Dec. 30, 2016; 7:00 PM, FS1	No. 21	No. 22 USC	W 84–61	13–2 (2–0)	28 – Brooks	6 – Tied	7 – Pritchard	Matthew Knight Arena (10,051); Eugene, OR
Jan. 4, 2017; 6:00 PM, ESPN2	No. 15	at Washington	W 83–61	14–2 (3–0)	28 – Dorsey	11 – Bell	5 – Benson	Alaska Airlines Arena (8,145); Seattle, WA
Jan. 7, 2017; 4:00 PM, P12N	No. 15	at Washington State	W 85–66	15–2 (4–0)	29 – Boucher	8 – Boucher	7 – Ennis	Beasley Coliseum (3,335); Pullman, WA
Jan. 14, 2017; 7:30 PM, P12N	No. 13	Oregon State; Civil War	W 85–43	16–2 (5–0)	17 – Pritchard	9 – Bell	5 – Tied	Matthew Knight Arena (12,364); Eugene, OR
Jan. 19, 2017; 6:00 PM, ESPN2	No. 11	California	W 86–63	17–2 (6–0)	26 – Bell	6 – Bell	6 – Dorsey	Matthew Knight Arena (10,010); Eugene, OR
Jan. 21, 2017; 3:00 PM, P12N	No. 11	Stanford	W 69–52	18–2 (7–0)	16 – Boucher	10 – Boucher	7 – Pritchard	Matthew Knight Arena (12,364); Eugene, OR
Jan. 26, 2017; 7:30 PM, FS1	No. 10	at Utah	W 73–67	19–2 (8–0)	19 – Brooks	7 – Boucher	4 – Benson	Jon M. Huntsman Center (15,000); Salt Lake City, UT
Jan. 28, 2017; 6:30 PM, P12N	No. 10	at Colorado	L 65–74	19–3 (8–1)	19 – Pritchard	7 – Tied	4 – Brooks	Coors Events Center (9,374); Boulder, CO
Feb. 2, 2017; 8:00 PM, FS1	No. 13	Arizona State	W 71–70	20–3 (9–1)	27 – Brooks	11 – Bell	4 – Tied	Matthew Knight Arena (11,901); Eugene, OR
Feb. 4, 2017; 1:00 PM, ESPN	No. 13	No. 5 Arizona	W 85–58	21–3 (10–1)	23 – Dorsey	6 – Bell	6 – Tied	Matthew Knight Arena (12,364); Eugene, OR
Feb. 9, 2017; 7:00 PM, ESPN	No. 5	at No. 10 UCLA	L 79–82	21–4 (10–2)	19 – Tied	15 – Bell	4 – Ennis	Pauley Pavilion (13,659); Los Angeles, CA
Feb. 11, 2017; 7:30 PM, P12N	No. 5	at USC	W 81–70	22–4 (11–2)	21 – Brooks	14 – Bell	4 – Bell	Galen Center (9,256); Los Angeles, CA
Feb. 16, 2017; 8:00 PM, ESPN2	No. 7	Utah	W 79–61	23–4 (12–2)	20 – Brooks	7 – Bell	7 – Pritchard	Matthew Knight Arena (12,364); Eugene, OR
Feb. 19, 2017; 12:00 PM, FOX	No. 7	Colorado	W 101–73	24–4 (13–2)	23 – Brooks	7 – Boucher	11 – Pritchard	Matthew Knight Arena (12,364); Eugene, OR
Feb. 22, 2017; 6:00 PM, ESPN2	No. 6	at California	W 68–65	25–4 (14–2)	22 – Brooks	8 – Bell	4 – Pritchard	Haas Pavilion (10,759); Berkeley, CA
Feb. 25, 2017; 1:00 PM, P12N	No. 6	at Stanford	W 75–73	26–4 (15–2)	15 – Dorsey	5 – Tied	4 – Brooks	Maples Pavilion (5,509); Stanford, CA
Mar. 4, 2017; 3:00 PM, ESPN2	No. 6	at Oregon State; Civil War	W 80–59	27–4 (16–2)	25 – Brooks	10 – Bell	6 – Pritchard	Gill Coliseum (9,201); Corvallis, OR
Pac-12 Tournament
Mar. 9, 2017; 12:00 PM, P12N	(1) No. 5	vs. (8) Arizona State; Quarterfinals	W 80–57	28–4	22 – Brooks	12 – Ennis	5 – Ennis	T-Mobile Arena (12,782); Paradise, NV
Mar. 10, 2017; 6:00 PM, P12N	(1) No. 5	vs. (5) California; Semifinals	W 73–65	29–4	23 – Dorsey	15 – Bell	5 – Ennis	T-Mobile Arena (19,224); Paradise, NV
Mar. 11, 2017; 8:00 PM, ESPN	(1) No. 5	vs. (2) No. 7 Arizona; Championship	L 80–83	29–5	25 – Brooks	10 – Bell	3 – Pritchard	T-Mobile Arena (18,927); Paradise, NV
NCAA tournament
Mar. 17, 2017*; 11:00 AM, TBS	(3 MW) No. 9	vs. (14 MW) Iona; First Round	W 93–77	30–5	24 – Dorsey	10 – Bell	4 – Tied	Golden 1 Center (15,833); Sacramento, CA
Mar. 19, 2017*; 4:10 PM, TBS	(3 MW) No. 9	vs. (11 MW) Rhode Island; Second Round	W 75–72	31–5	27 – Dorsey	12 – Bell	4 – Ennis	Golden 1 Center (16,774); Sacramento, CA
Mar. 23, 2017*; 4:10 PM, CBS	(3 MW) No. 9	vs. (7 MW) No. 23 Michigan; Sweet Sixteen	W 69–68	32–5	20 – Dorsey	13 – Bell	5 – Brooks	Sprint Center (18,475); Kansas City, MO
Mar. 25, 2017*; 5:39 PM, TBS	(3 MW) No. 9	vs. (1 MW) No. 3 Kansas; Elite Eight	W 74–60	33–5	24 – Dorsey	14 – Bell	4 – Brooks	Sprint Center (18,643); Kansas City, MO
Apr. 1, 2017*; 5:49 PM, CBS	(3 MW) No. 9	vs. (1 S) No. 6 North Carolina; Final Four	L 76–77	33–6	21 – Dorsey	16 – Bell	3 – Ennis	University of Phoenix Stadium (77,612); Glendale, AZ
*Non-conference game. ^{#}Rankings from AP Poll. (#) Tournament seedings in parentheses. MW=Midwest Region, S= South Region. All times are in Pacific Time.

== Ranking movement ==
Ranking movements Legend: ██ Increase in ranking ██ Decrease in ranking ( ) = First-place votes
	Week																			
Poll	Pre	1	2	3	4	5	6	7	8	9	10	11	12	13	14	15	16	17	18	Final
AP	5 (1)	4	13	23	24	22	20	21	15	13	11	10	13	5	7	6	6	5	9	Not released
Coaches	5 (1)	4 (1)	12	20	24	22	21	21	14	11	10	10	13	6	8	7	6	5	9	3

*AP does not release post-NCAA tournament rankings
