= 2016–17 USC Trojans men's basketball team =

American college basketball season

2016–17 USC Trojans men's basketball

Las Vegas Classic champions

NCAA tournament, Second Round
- Conference: Pac-12 Conference
- Record: 26–10 (10–8 Pac-12)
- Head coach: Andy Enfield (4th season)
- Assistant coaches: Tony Bland; Jason Hart; Chris Capko
- Home arena: Galen Center

2016–17 Pac-12 Conference men's basketball standings
	Conf.				Overall
Team	W		L	PCT	W		L	PCT
No. 9 Oregon	16	–	2	.889	33	–	6	.846
No. 4 Arizona †	16	–	2	.889	32	–	5	.865
No. 8 UCLA	15	–	3	.833	31	–	5	.861
Utah	11	–	7	.611	20	–	12	.625
California	10	–	8	.556	21	–	13	.618
USC	10	–	8	.556	26	–	10	.722
Colorado	8	–	10	.444	19	–	15	.559
Arizona State	7	–	11	.389	15	–	18	.455
Stanford	6	–	12	.333	14	–	17	.452
Washington State	6	–	12	.333	13	–	18	.419
Washington	2	–	16	.111	9	–	22	.290
Oregon State	1	–	17	.056	5	–	27	.156
† Pac-12 Tournament winner Rankings from AP poll

The 2016–17 USC Trojans men's basketball team represented the University of Southern California during the 2016–17 NCAA Division I men's basketball season. They were led by fourth-year head coach Andy Enfield. They played their home games at the Galen Center in Los Angeles as members of the Pac-12 Conference. They finished the season 26–10, 10–8 in Pac-12 play to finish in a tie for fifth place; their 26 victories set a program record. They defeated Washington in the first round of the Pac-12 tournament before losing in the quarterfinals to UCLA. They received an at-large bid to the NCAA tournament where they defeated Providence in the First Four and SMU in the First Round before losing in the Second Round to Baylor.

== Previous season ==
The Trojans finished the 2015–16 season 21–13, 9–9 in Pac-12 play to finish in three-way tie for sixth place. The Trojans beat UCLA in the first round before losing to Utah in the quarterfinals of the Pac-12 tournament. They received an at-large bid as a No. 8 seed in the East Region of the NCAA tournament, marking the Trojans' first Tournament bid since 2011. USC lost to No. 9-seed Providence in the First Round.

== Off-season ==
=== Departures ===
Name	Number	Pos.	Height	Weight	Year	Hometown	Notes
Strahinja Gavrilović	14	F	6'9"	230	Sr.	Kragujevac, Serbia	Graduated
Darion Clark	0	F	6'7"	230	RS Jr.	Conyers, Georgia	Transfer to Grand Canyon
Katin Reinhardt	5	G	6'6"	220	RS Jr.	Dana Point, California	Transfer to Marquette
Malik Martin	2	F	6'11"	220	So.	Miami, Florida	Transfer to USF
Malik Marquetti	24	G/F	6'6"	195	So.	Compton, California	Transfer to Louisiana–Lafayette
Nikola Jovanović	32	F/C	6'11"	230	Jr.	Belgrade, Serbia	Declared for 2016 NBA draft
Julian Jacobs	12	G	6'4"	180	Jr.	Las Vegas, Nevada	Declared for 2016 NBA draft

=== Incoming transfers ===
Name	Pos.	Height	Weight	Year	Hometown	Notes
Derryck Thornton	PG	6'2"	175	So.	Chatsworth, California	Transferred from Duke. Will sit out for 2016–17 season due to NCAA transfer rules and have three years of eligibility.
Charles Buggs	F	6'9"	230	Gr.	Arlington, Texas	Transferred from Minnesota. Eligible to play immediately.

=== 2016 recruiting class ===
College recruiting information
Name	Hometown	School	Height	Weight	Commit date
Harrison Henderson #52 PF	Grand Prairie, Texas	South Grand Prairie HS	6 ft 9 in (2.06 m)	200 lb (91 kg)	Jun 14, 2015
Harrison Henderson #52 PF	Recruit ratings: Scout: Rivals: 247Sports: ESPN:				
De'Anthony Melton #22 SG	Encino, California	Crespi Carmelite HS	6 ft 3 in (1.91 m)	180 lb (82 kg)	Sep 16, 2015
De'Anthony Melton #22 SG	Recruit ratings: Scout: Rivals: 247Sports: ESPN:				
Jonah Mathews #12 SG	Santa Monica, California	Santa Monica HS	6 ft 3 in (1.91 m)	180 lb (82 kg)	Sep 30, 2015
Jonah Mathews #12 SG	Recruit ratings: Scout: Rivals: 247Sports: ESPN:				
Nick Rakocevic #63 PF	Westchester, Illinois	St. Joseph HS	6 ft 10 in (2.08 m)	210 lb (95 kg)	Apr 11, 2016
Nick Rakocevic #63 PF	Recruit ratings: Scout: Rivals: 247Sports: ESPN:				
Overall recruit ranking:
Note: In many cases, Scout, Rivals, 247Sports, On3, and ESPN may conflict in their listings of height and weight.; In these cases, the average was taken. ESPN grades are on a 100-point scale.; Sources:

College recruiting information (2017)
Name	Hometown	School	Height	Weight	Commit date
Jordan Usher #25 SG	Marietta, Georgia	Wheeler HS	6 ft 5 in (1.96 m)	180 lb (82 kg)	Oct 5, 2016
Jordan Usher #25 SG	Recruit ratings: Scout: Rivals: 247Sports: ESPN: (82)				
Victor Uyaelunmo #20 C	Miami, Florida	Calvary Christian HS	7 ft 0 in (2.13 m)	210 lb (95 kg)	Nov 9, 2016
Victor Uyaelunmo #20 C	Recruit ratings: Scout: Rivals: 247Sports: ESPN: (82)				
Charles O'Bannon Jr. #10 SG	Las Vegas, Nevada	Bishop Gorman HS	6 ft 5 in (1.96 m)	190 lb (86 kg)	Dec 13, 2016
Charles O'Bannon Jr. #10 SG	Recruit ratings: Scout: Rivals: 247Sports: ESPN: (88)				
Overall recruit ranking:
Note: In many cases, Scout, Rivals, 247Sports, On3, and ESPN may conflict in their listings of height and weight.; In these cases, the average was taken. ESPN grades are on a 100-point scale.; Sources:

== Roster ==
2016–17 USC Trojans men's basketball team
Players
Coaches

Pos.	#	Name	Height	Weight	Year	Previous school	Hometown
G	0	Shaqquan Aaron	6 ft 7 in (2.01 m)	190 lb (86 kg)	RS So	Louisville	Seattle, Washington
F	1	Charles Buggs	6 ft 9 in (2.06 m)	230 lb (104 kg)	RS Sr	Minnesota	Arlington, Texas
G	2	Jonah Mathews	6 ft 3 in (1.91 m)	185 lb (84 kg)	Fr	Santa Monica HS	Santa Monica, California
F	3	Harrison Henderson	6 ft 10 in (2.08 m)	220 lb (100 kg)	Fr	South Grand Prairie HS	Dallas, Texas
F	4	Chimezie Metu	6 ft 11 in (2.11 m)	225 lb (102 kg)	So	Lawndale HS	Lawndale, California
G	5	Derryck Thornton (I) (redshirt)	6 ft 2 in (1.88 m)	185 lb (84 kg)	So	Duke	Los Angeles, California
G	11	Jordan McLaughlin	6 ft 1 in (1.85 m)	180 lb (82 kg)	Jr	Etiwanda HS	Etiwanda, California
G	12	Devin Fleming (W)	6 ft 2 in (1.88 m)	180 lb (82 kg)	So	Valley View HS	Moreno Valley, California
F	13	Samer Dhillon (W)	6 ft 8 in (2.03 m)	210 lb (95 kg)	Sr	Inderkum HS	Sacramento, California
G	21	Kurt Karis (W)	6 ft 1 in (1.85 m)	190 lb (86 kg)	RS Jr	Chicago State	Northbrook, Illinois
G	22	De'Anthony Melton	6 ft 4 in (1.93 m)	190 lb (86 kg)	Fr	Crespi Carmelite HS	North Hollywood, California
F	25	Bennie Boatwright	6 ft 10 in (2.08 m)	230 lb (104 kg)	So	Village Christian School	Mission Hills, California
G	30	Elijah Stewart	6 ft 5 in (1.96 m)	190 lb (86 kg)	Jr	Westchester	DeRidder, Louisiana
F	31	Nick Rakocevic	6 ft 11 in (2.11 m)	215 lb (98 kg)	Fr	St. Joseph HS	Chicago, Illinois

Head coach

- Andy Enfield (Johns Hopkins)

Assistant coach(es)

- Tony Bland (San Diego State)
- Jason Hart (Syracuse)
- Chris Capko (South Florida)

Legend

- (C) Team captain
- (S) Suspended
- (I) Ineligible
- (W) Walk-on
- Injured
- Current redshirt

Roster

- Dec. 1, 2016 – Sophomore Bennie Boatwright out with a left knee injury. Expected to miss six weeks. Made return against Washington on Feb. 1 after missing 15 games.

== Schedule and results ==
Date time, TV	Rank^{#}	Opponent^{#}	Result	Record	High points	High rebounds	High assists	Site (attendance) city, state
Non-conference regular season
Nov. 11, 2016*; 8:00 PM, P12N		Montana	W 75–61	1–0	30 – Stewart	7 – 3 Tied	3 – Tied	Galen Center (3,513); Los Angeles, California
Nov. 13, 2016*; 4:00 PM, P12N		Omaha	W 82–72	2–0	16 – Aaron	11 – Metu	5 – McLaughlin	Galen Center (2,993); Los Angeles, California
Nov. 18, 2016*; 4:00 PM, SECN		at Texas A&M	W 65–63	3–0	14 – Metu	11 – Tied	4 – McLaughlin	Reed Arena (8,749); College Station, Texas
Nov. 22, 2016*; 6:00 PM, P12N		New Orleans	W 88–54	4–0	21 – Stewart	7 – Metu	9 – McLaughlin	Galen Center (2,711); Los Angeles, California
Nov. 25, 2016*; 4:00 PM, P12N		SMU	W 78–73	5–0	17 – Boatwright	6 – Melton	5 – Tied	Galen Center (3,713); Los Angeles, California
Nov. 27, 2016*; 7:00 PM, P12N		UC Santa Barbara	W 96–72	6–0	21 – Boatwright	5 – Tied	5 – Tied	Galen Center (2,892); Los Angeles, California
Nov. 30, 2016*; 7:00 PM		at San Diego	W 76–55	7–0	19 – Metu	13 – Metu	4 – McLaughlin	Jenny Craig Pavilion (2,921); San Diego, California
Dec. 3, 2016*; 5:00 PM, ESPNU		vs. BYU; HoopHall LA	W 91–84	8–0	24 – McLaughlin	8 – Melton	6 – Melton	Staples Center (7,952); Los Angeles, California
Dec. 11, 2016*; 5:00 PM, P12N		Pepperdine	W 93–67	9–0	26 – Stewart	10 – Metu	6 – McLaughlin	Galen Center (2,928); Los Angeles, California
Dec. 17, 2016*; 7:30 PM, P12N	No. 24	Troy; Las Vegas Classic	W 82–77	10–0	21 – McLaughlin	8 – Metu	5 – Melton	Galen Center (3,941); Los Angeles, California
Dec. 19, 2016*; 7:30 PM, P12N	No. 23	Cornell; Las Vegas Classic	W 79–67	11–0	17 – Metu	8 – Stewart	9 – McLaughlin	Galen Center (4,418); Los Angeles, California
Dec. 22, 2016*; 7:30 PM, FS1	No. 23	vs. Missouri State; Las Vegas Classic semifinals	W 83–75	12–0	21 – Stewart	9 – Metu	5 – McLaughlin	Orleans Arena; Paradise, Nevada
Dec. 23, 2016*; 8:00 PM, FS1	No. 23	vs. Wyoming; Las Vegas Classic championship	W 94–92 ^{OT}	13–0	22 – McLaughlin	8 – Melton	5 – McLaughlin	Orleans Arena; Paradise, Nevada
Pac-12 regular season
Dec. 28, 2016; 8:00 PM, P12N	No. 22	at Oregon State	W 70–63	14–0 (1–0)	19 – Metu	8 – Tied	4 – McLaughlin	Gill Coliseum (4,580); Corvallis, Oregon
Dec. 30, 2016; 7:00 PM, FS1	No. 22	at No. 21 Oregon	L 61–84	14–1 (1–1)	13 – Melton	11 – Metu	4 – McLaughlin	Matthew Knight Arena (10,051); Eugene, Oregon
Jan. 5, 2017; 8:00 PM, P12N	No. 25	Stanford	W 72–56	15–1 (2–1)	15 – McLaughlin	10 – Metu	6 – McLaughlin	Galen Center (4,092); Los Angeles, California
Jan. 8, 2017; 7:00 PM, ESPNU	No. 25	California	L 73–74	15–2 (2–2)	20 – Tied	7 – Melton	5 – McLaughlin	Galen Center (5,528); Los Angeles, California
Jan. 12, 2017; 6:00 PM, P12N	No. 25	at Utah	L 64–86	15–3 (2–3)	17 – Metu	6 – Tied	3 – Tied	Jon M. Huntsman Center (12,470); Salt Lake City, Utah
Jan. 15, 2017; 5:30 PM, ESPNU	No. 25	at Colorado	W 71–68	16–3 (3–3)	24 – Metu	9 – Melton	6 – Melton	Coors Events Center (8,036); Boulder, Colorado
Jan. 19, 2017; 6:00 PM, P12N		No. 14 Arizona	L 66–73	16–4 (3–4)	20 – Stewart	7 – Tied	8 – McLaughlin	Galen Center (4,930); Los Angeles, California
Jan. 22, 2017; 5:30 PM, ESPNU		Arizona State	W 82–79	17–4 (4–4)	29 – Stewart	8 – Rakocevic	8 – Tied	Galen Center (2,931); Los Angeles, California
Jan. 25, 2017; 8:00 PM, FS1		No. 8 UCLA; Rivalry	W 84–76	18–4 (5–4)	23 – Aaron	9 – Melton	8 – McLaughlin	Galen Center (10,258); Los Angeles, California
Feb. 1, 2017; 8:00 PM, ESPNU		at Washington	W 82–74	19–4 (6–4)	23 – Boatwright	8 – Metu	6 – Melton	Alaska Airlines Arena (7,223); Seattle, Washington
Feb. 4, 2017; 5:00 PM, P12N		at Washington State	W 86–77	20–4 (7–4)	29 – Metu	8 – Metu	4 – McLaughlin	Beasley Coliseum (3,551); Pullman, Washington
Feb. 9, 2017; 8:00 PM, P12N		Oregon State	W 92–66	21–4 (8–4)	24 – Aaron	7 – Metu	4 – Mathews	Galen Center (3,989); Los Angeles, California
Feb. 11, 2017; 7:30 PM, P12N		No. 5 Oregon	L 70–81	21–5 (8–5)	16 – Metu	7 – McLaughlin	4 – McLaughlin	Galen Center (9,256); Los Angeles, California
Feb. 18, 2017; 7:00 PM, P12N		at No. 6 UCLA; Rivalry	L 70–102	21–6 (8–6)	20 – Boatwright	10 – Boatwright	5 – McLaughlin	Pauley Pavilion (13,659); Los Angeles, California
Feb. 23, 2017; 7:00 PM, P12N		at No. 4 Arizona	L 77–90	21–7 (8–7)	23 – Boatwright	12 – Metu	4 – Melton	McKale Center (14,644); Tucson, Arizona
Feb. 26, 2017; 3:30 PM, P12N		at Arizona State	L 82–83	21–8 (8–8)	22 – Boatwright	13 – Metu	10 – McLaughlin	Wells Fargo Arena (8,037); Tempe, Arizona
Mar. 1, 2017; 7:00 PM, P12N		Washington State	W 87–64	22–8 (9–8)	16 – McLaughlin	9 – Tied	10 – McLaughlin	Galen Center (3,553); Los Angeles, California
Mar. 4, 2017; 3:30 PM, P12N		Washington	W 74–58	23–8 (10–8)	22 – McLaughlin	8 – Rakocevic	9 – McLaughlin	Galen Center (7,256); Los Angeles, California
Pac-12 Tournament
Mar. 8, 2017; 8:30 PM, P12N	(6)	vs. (11) Washington; First Round	W 78–73	24–8	24 – Metu	9 – Metu	6 – McLaughlin	T-Mobile Arena (9,978); Paradise, Nevada
Mar. 9, 2017; 8:30 PM, ESPN	(6)	vs. (3) No. 3 UCLA; Quarterfinals	L 74–76	24–9	18 – McLaughlin	14 – Metu	6 – McLaughlin	T-Mobile Arena (18,153); Paradise, Nevada
NCAA tournament
Mar. 15, 2017*; 6:10 PM, truTV	(11 E)	vs. (11 E) Providence; First Four	W 75–71	25–9	24 – Boatwright	10 – McLaughlin	4 – Tied	UD Arena (11,528); Dayton, Ohio
Mar. 17, 2017*; 12:10 PM, truTV	(11 E)	vs. (6 E) No. 11 SMU; First Round	W 66–65	26–9	22 – Stewart	7 – Metu	6 – McLaughlin	BOK Center (13,571); Tulsa, Oklahoma
Mar. 19, 2017*; 4:45 PM, truTV	(11 E)	vs. (3 E) No. 12 Baylor; Second Round	L 78–82	26–10	26 – Metu	5 – Boatwright	6 – McLaughlin	BOK Center (15,229); Tulsa, Oklahoma
*Non-conference game. ^{#}Rankings from AP Poll. (#) Tournament seedings in parentheses. E=East Region. All times are in Pacific Time.

== Ranking movement ==
Ranking movement Legend: ██ Increase in ranking. ██ Decrease in ranking. RV=Received votes.
Poll	Pre	Wk 2	Wk 3	Wk 4	Wk 5	Wk 6	Wk 7	Wk 8	Wk 9	Wk 10	Wk 11	Wk 12	Wk 13	Wk 14	Wk 15	Wk 16	Wk 17	Wk 18	Post	Final
AP	NV	NV	NV	RV	RV	24	23	22	25	25	RV	RV	RV	RV	RV	RV	RV	RV	NV	N/A*
Coaches	RV	NV	NV	RV	RV	25	25	22	RV	25	RV	RV	RV	RV	RV	RV	RV	RV	RV	
