= David Grace (basketball) =

American basketball coach

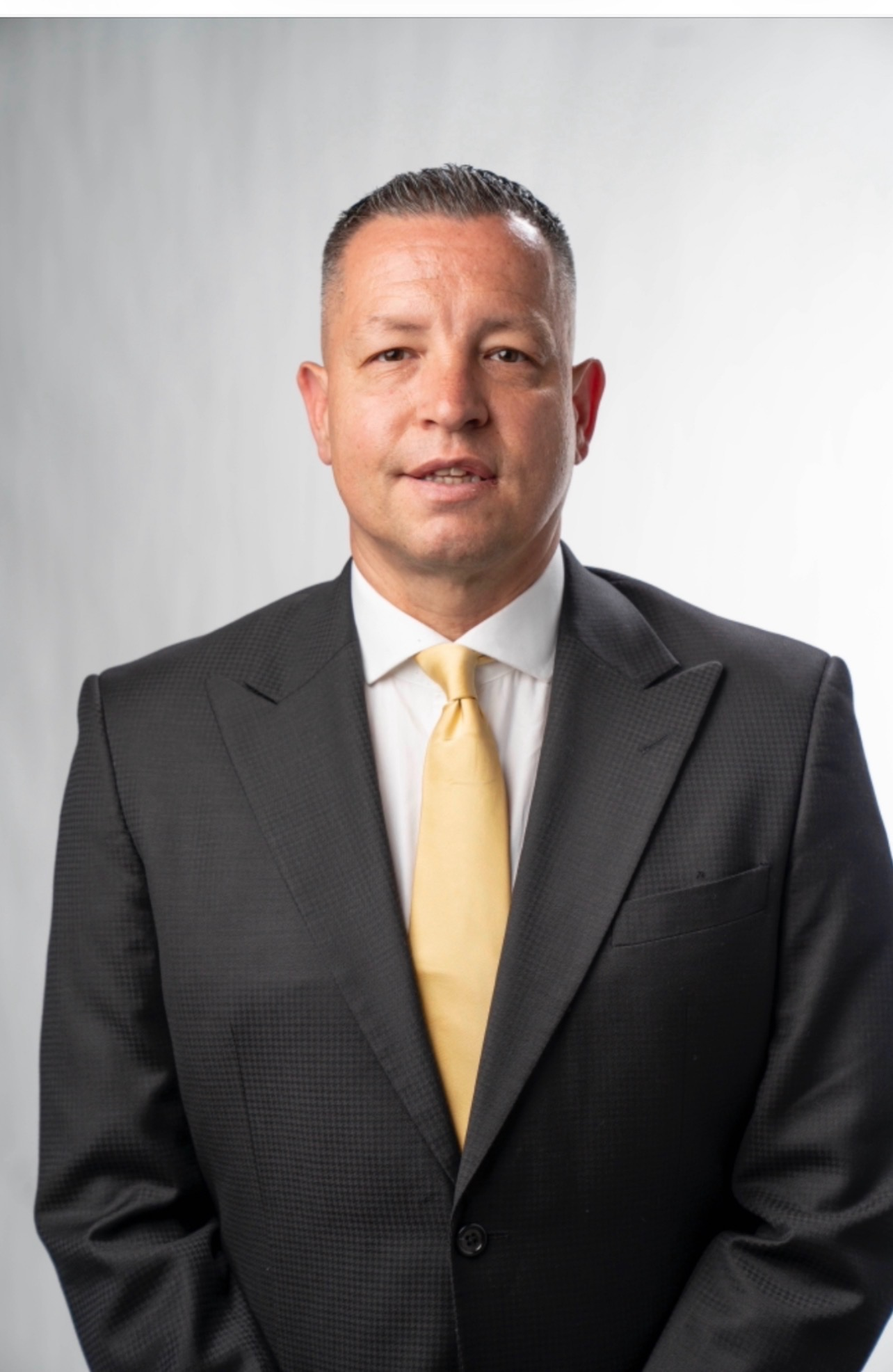

Biographical details
- Born: Aberdeen, Maryland
- Education: Park University

Coaching career (HC unless noted)
- 1999–2004: Trevor G. Browne HS (assistant)
- 2004–2006: South Mountain HS
- 2006–2007: Sacramento State (assistant)
- 2007–2008: San Francisco (assistant)
- 2008–2013: Oregon State (assistant)
- 2013–2018: UCLA (assistant)
- 2018–2019: California (assistant)
- 2019–2021: Vanderbilt (associate HC)
- 2022–2023: Centennial H.S.
- 2023–2025: Campbell Hall School
- 2026-2027: Florida Southwestern

Accomplishments and honors

Awards
- As assistant and head coach: California Interscholastic Federation 1A Conference Elite Eight (2024–25); California Interscholastic Federation 2A Conference Elite Eight (2023–24); Arizona Interscholastic Association Division 5A Conference Final Four (2022–23); 3x NCAA Tournament Sweet Sixteens (2014, 2015, 2017); Pac-12 Tournament champion (2013); CBI champion (2009); Arizona Varsity/Rivals AZ 5A2 Conference COY (2006); Arizona 5A2 Conference State Champion (2006)

David Grace is an American college basketball coach who has had a high degree of success at multiple levels such as high D1 college, high school, and AAU, and is retired from the United States Air Force. He is the current Head Coach at Florida Southwestern State College in Fort Myers, Florida and the former Head Coach at Campbell Hall School in Studio City, CA. He left the school after taking it to consecutive Division 1A and 2A Elite 8s in the California state championship tournament last year and the year before for the first time in school history. He was previously Head Coach at Centennial HS in Peoria, AZ and took them to the AZ State Championship Final Four. At the high D1 college level he was most recently the associate head coach for the Vanderbilt Commodores of the Southeastern Conference under former NBA great Jerry Stackhouse.

== Military career ==
Grace grew up in Aberdeen, Maryland, while his father Gerald worked long hours as a mechanic and his mother worked as a beautician. He began military life after his mother remarried a serviceman and then moved to a series of bases over the years. He joined the United States Air Force at age 18 and served for 20 years. For 16 years, Grace traveled between Air Force bases in Turkey, Germany, Spain, Sicily (Comiso AB), Saudi Arabia, Georgia, and Virginia before settling down at Luke AFB in the Phoenix, Arizona area for the last few years of his enlistment.

A decorated former technical sergeant who has seen combat in Operation Desert Storm, Grace is a supporter of his fellow military veterans, especially those who have faced challenges after they have returned home from war zones. Jeff Eisenberg of Yahoo Sports said the importance of discipline, teamwork, and following the chain of command became ingrained in Grace, and three months in Saudi Arabia (during Operation Desert Storm) also taught him to appreciate the difference between the life-threatening pressure of a combat zone and the day-to-day challenges of a job.

== Coaching career ==
=== AAU ===
Grace began his youth coaching career in 1997 while he was stationed at Langley AFB, Virginia, when he started coaching with the Boo Williams Amateur Athletic Union (AAU) program in Hampton, Virginia. After leaving Langley, Grace was stationed at Luke AFB near Phoenix and coached two AAU teams and a high school team. "I've been very proud of him seeing the progress he's made from the time he began here as an assistant coach at a high school to becoming an assistant coach at OSU (Oregon State University)," said Ronald Goodwyn, 56th Fighter Wing equal opportunity director. "He has taken the Air Force core values and tied them into his coaching to prepare the athletes to be successful even after their life in basketball."

After relocating to Luke AFB in Arizona, he began coaching AAU teams with the Compton Magic. He also co-founded and coached the Arizona Magic AAU program in the Phoenix, Arizona area, as an affiliate of the Compton Magic, that made it to the Elite Eight (of 338 AAU teams) of the 2004 Reebok Big Time Tournament in Las Vegas, Nevada. That team that featured Philadelphia 76ers player Jerryd Bayless (Arizona), Kaleo Kina (Naval Academy), Darren Jordan (Oral Roberts), Ty Morrison (Creighton/Grand Canyon), and former Stanford All-Conference selection and European League professional Lawrence Hill (Le Havre, France). They finished the AAU season ranked 21st in the nation and were the highest ranked team ever from Arizona up until that time.

=== High school ===
Grace began his high school coaching career at Trevor Browne High School in Phoenix while at Luke AFB, and then retired and moved into coaching and teaching full-time. As an assistant varsity coach he helped lead Trevor Browne to a State Final Four and the team finished ranked in the Top 40 in the nation by the Sporting News. Grace began working toward becoming a full-time HS teacher and taught business and computer skills. He then became head coach at South Mountain High School in Phoenix, Arizona, for the 2004–05 season and won the 2005-06 Division 5A-2 State Championship with a win/loss record of 29–4, and was the Arizona Varsity (Rivals.com) and Arizona Informant Coach of the Year.

=== College ===
Grace started his college coaching career at California State University, Sacramento in 2006 as an assistant coach to head coach Jerome Jenkins, after receiving a recommendation from University of Arizona coach Lute Olson. Grace's first major recruit there was 2006-07 Big Sky Freshman of the Year Vinnie McGhee from Oakland's McClymonds High School.

After one year in Sacramento, Grace then became an assistant coach at the University of San Francisco in 2007-08 under head coach Jessie Evans, who had been an assistant coach under Lute Olson on his 1996-97 Arizona Wildcats men's basketball National Championship team.

==== Oregon State ====
Grace was hired as an assistant coach of the Oregon State Beavers men's basketball team in 2008–09 by head coach Craig Robinson, the older brother of U.S. First Lady Michelle Obama, and served there through the 2012–13 season. His first major Beaver recruit was All-Conference Team selection Roberto Nelson, who became the 2012-13 Pac-12 Conference scoring champion (20.7 points per game), and was a European pro in Italy (Trieste).

==== UCLA ====
In 2016 Grace was ranked #7 nationally and #1 in the West by ESPN for the best recruiters based on feedback from a D1 coaching peer survey by ESPN. " On March 24, 2018 long time Tucson sports columnist Greg Hansen, in referring to rejuvenating the Arizona Wildcat program after their first round NCAA exit, asked in his column "Is (Sean) Miller willing to pursue someone like UCLA's David Grace, who, in my opinion, is the league's most feared recruiter and top assistant coach?"

Grace completed 11 years of coaching in the Pac-12 Conference where he was one of the longest tenured coaches. Until 2018, he was an assistant coach at UCLA under head coach Steve Alford, his fifth season with the Bruins who had 117 wins during his time there. Three of Grace's first four seasons at UCLA ended with Sweet 16 appearances in the NCAA Tournament.

ESPN ranked the 2018 Bruin recruiting class number two in the nation behind only Duke. "With this current class, it's fairly clear that UCLA has re-established itself as one of the premier recruiting schools in the country. Given the Bruins' history, that shouldn't be news -- but they have now landed nine ESPN 100 prospects in the last two recruiting classes, on the heels of two five-star prospects and three one-and-done prospects from the 2016 class."

"David has been tremendous," Alford said. "I've been fortunate in my 23 years to not just hire people who understand basketball but who are also really good people, and that's what David is. He's a great guy and he's a tireless worker. He's always on the phone calling or texting recruits."

The 2016–17 UCLA Bruins men's basketball team included new recruits Lonzo Ball (the Naismith National Prep Player of the Year), T. J. Leaf, and Ike Anigbogu, and was rated the fifth best recruiting class in the nation by ESPN. Grace had recruited Ball prior to Alford arriving at UCLA. "They went up the court about four times, then stopped," Grace recalled. "I walked over to his head coach and said [Lonzo] has a scholarship offer from Oregon State. I knew he was that good." After his freshman season with UCLA Ball was voted consensus first team All-American (USBWA, NABC, and Sporting News) and won the Wayman Tisdale Award as the top freshman in America. T. J. Leaf led UCLA in scoring at 16.3 ppg and was voted First Team All-Pac-12 Conference.

Columnist Clay Fowler of the Orange County Register wrote that these Bruins tied a program record with 28 regular season wins (31–5 overall, 15-3 Conference) and spent nearly half the season in the top five of the AP poll, rising as high as No. 2. UCLA finished its season as the highest-scoring team in the country (89.8 points per game), the nation's leader in field-goal percentage (52.2), assists per game (21.4) and assist-to-turnover ratio (1.91). The Bruins’ peaked with a road victory at Arizona on Feb. 25 that earned UCLA the distinction as the only team to ever win games in Kentucky and Arizona's home arenas in the same season.

Ball and Leaf both declared for the NBA draft after the conclusion of the 2016–17 season and were drafted in the first round along with Ike Anigbogu in the second round.

Shortly before the Final Four of the 2018 NCAA Division I men's basketball tournament, Grace was informed that he would not be retained by UCLA, being replaced by Murry Bartow.

==== California ====
He was then hired by Wyking Jones to be an assistant coach for the California Golden Bears men's basketball team in April 2018. Jones had previously worked for Steve Alford at the University of New Mexico, racking up 52 wins in two years before heading to Louisville under Rick Pitino, where they won the NCAA D1 National Championship in 2013. On October 1, 2018, Grace landed Joel Brown as a Cal commit, the number 4 ranked player in Canada (from Toronto), and the number 12 ranked PG in the class of 2019 according to 247Sports.

==== Vanderbilt ====
On April 16, 2019, Grace was hired by Jerry Stackhouse to be the associate head coach for the Vanderbilt Commodores. Stackhouse, an 18-year NBA player, was signed to a six-year deal by new AD Malcolm Turner, after serving as an assistant coach with the Memphis Grizzlies and Toronto Raptors and had also been the NBA G League Coach of the Year for the Raptors 905. Turner became Vanderbilt's vice chancellor and AD shortly before hiring Stackhouse, whom he had worked with previously as president of the NBA G League.

Vanderbilt's first recruit under Stackhouse and Grace was Scotty Pippen Jr. of Sierra Canyon HS in California, son of NBA Hall of Famer Scottie Pippen of the Chicago Bulls who won six NBA championships led by Michael Jordan. He re-committed in April 2019. Their second commit was 6'6" Kenyon Martin Jr., son of 15 year NBA player Kenyon Martin, who teamed up with Scotty Pippen Jr. at Sierra Canyon HS to go 32-3 and win the California State Championship Open Division in 2019. However, Martin decided to pursue a pro career abroad instead of attending college.

After only one season on the recruiting circuit, Grace was named by his fellow college basketball coaches as the number one recruiter in the Southeast, having been ranked number one on the West Coast for several years while he was at UCLA. On February 5, 2020, Vanderbilt broke its record setting SEC consecutive game losing streak (26) begun the previous season under the previous head coach and beat 18th ranked LSU 99–90 in Nashville by shooting 57% from the field and scoring more points that it has in any game in the last eight years. Though down to six scholarship players due to injuries, including the loss of the SEC's leading scorer and shooter, Aaron Nesmith, Vanderbilt won back to back SEC games over Alabama (away) and South Carolina (home) to end the regular season. "The Commodores have upset LSU (then No. 18), Alabama and the Gamecocks. They also suffered five hard-fought losses by single-digit margins to No. 6 Kentucky, Florida, Tennessee, Georgia and Missouri.".

In April 2020 Sports illustrated reported that Grace was one of the top 50 most impactful coaches in the country at the high D1 level, joining 10 other SEC assistant coaches. In May 2020 it was reported that Grace and special advisor Ricardo Patton were no longer with Vanderbilt.

==== 2021 NCAA Final Four, NBA, and other pro players ====
Grace recruited five of the top eight rotation players for the UCLA Bruins 2021 Final Four team, who are also #2 in ESPN's 2021-2022 rankings. His other former recruits (commits) and players who have played in the NBA as of 2022 include Jordan Adams, Lou Amundsen, Kyle Anderson, Ike Anigbogu, LaMelo Ball, Lonzo Ball, Jerryd Bayless, Jonah Bolden, Jared Cunningham, Aaron Holiday, Zach LaVine, T. J. Leaf, Saben Lee, Kevon Looney, Kenyon Martin Jr., Eric Moreland, Aaron Nesmith, Norman Powell, Travis Wear, Thomas Welsh, Chris Smith, Jules Bernard, and Scotty Pippen Jr. Five of these players were NBA Lottery picks in the Ball brothers, Bayless, LaVine, and Nesmith. Scotty Pippen Jr. of Vanderbilt was All-SEC and nominated for the Lute Olson National Player of the Year Award for 2022 as a junior before signing a four year NBA contract with the Memphis Grizzlies on October 15, 2024..

LaVine and Lamelo Ball were selected to play in the 2022 NBA All Star Game. LaVine was also selected to play in the 2021 NBA All-Star Game as well as for Team USA in the 2021 Tokyo Olympics. LaMelo Ball was voted the 2021 NBA Rookie of the Year with the Charlotte Hornets. In 2022 Lonzo Ball and LaVine were both starting for the Chicago Bulls who at 38-21 were currently tied for first in the Eastern Conference and had been rejuvenated, in part, due to Ball's passing at the point guard position, according to Grace. "The year before Lonzo gets to UCLA we weren’t very good. He comes in and changes the whole culture with the pass. ...We ran basically the same plays from the year before and it just goes to show you what can happen when you bring a person in and he cares more about his teammates and about passing the basketball. That’s what I think is happening now with the Bulls.”

==== 2022: Return to Head Coaching ====
In 2022 Grace accepted the position of Head Coach at legendary athletic powerhouse Centennial High School in Peoria, AZ. At 18-10 and ranked the #5 seed in their 5A division Grace led his squad back to the Final Four in the state playoffs. It is Grace's most recent trip to the State Final Four since his Phoenix South Mountain team won the 5A state championship in 2006. Centennial lost by one point to #1 seed Campo Verde in an away game to finish the season.

In the seventeen years between AZ High School Final Fours he served as a D1 level Assistant Coach and Associate head coach in the Big Sky, WCC, Pac 12, and the SEC athletic conferences. He co-led those teams to multiple NCAA and CBI tournaments, winning a Pac 12 Championship, and reaching as high as a #2 national ranking for the UCLA Bruins behind current NBA star Lonzo Ball.

==== 2023-2024 ====
In 2023 Coach Grace accepted the position of Head Coach at Studio City powerhouse Campbell Hall School in Los Angeles, CA, where he will be coaching the sons of NBA greats such as Rip Hamilton. Campbell Hall was the home of the Holiday brothers, Justin, Jrue, and Aaron, all currently in the NBA. Aaron Holiday played for Coach Grace at UCLA.

In his first season with Campbell Hall he led the varsity squad to the CIF Southern Section 2AA Championship Quarterfinals where they lost in an away game at St. Anthony's 91–86. No Campbell Hall boys' basketball team has ever made it that far at the 2AA level, which is the second highest level in California.

In his first year at The Hall Grace coached three players who have received full ride basketball scholarships and a fourth who has multiple offers. They are Isaiah Johnson - Colorado, Aaron Powell - Rice, Baron Bellamy - Westmont, and James Bass - Undecided. This adds to the athletes receiving full ride scholarships in his former high school coaching jobs, not including club ball. They are Shawn Deadwiler II - LMU, Kaleo Kina - Navy, Daren Jordan - Oral Roberts, and Ty Morrison - Creighton.

==== 2024-2025 ====
Coach Grace led Campbell Hall to the CIF SS Elite 8 in Division 1 before losing to Crean Lutheran 73-66. It was the school's first time ever in that division with only 575 total students. In the quarterfinals they upset #1 Crespi in CIF SS Division I, coached by former LA Laker Derek Fisher, who was also the former NY Knicks and Los Angeles Sparks head coach. For the year they finished 19-10 and all three seniors will play college basketball. Isaiah Johnson, University of Colorado (D1); James Bass, UT Martin (DI); Sajan Bristol, Moorpark College (JUCO) Johnson broke the all time scoring record for freshmen at Colorado in the 25-26 season.

==== 2025-2026 ====
Grace left Campbell Hall prior to the beginning of their basketball season and is currently conducting speaking engagements, basketball camps, and assisting former players and fellow coaches with his 26 years of basketball coaching experience.

==== 2026-2027 ====
In June 2026 Coach Grace was named Head Coach of the Florida Southwestern State College Men's Basketball team in Fort Myers, Florida, a Division I level Junior College in the Citrus Conference playing in the Suncoast Credit Union Arena.

== Personal life ==
Grace grew up in Aberdeen, Maryland and played basketball and baseball at Aberdeen High School. He earned a bachelor's of science degree in management (human resources) from Park University, and degrees in logistics and social services from the Air Force. He and his wife, Crystal, have six children. Grace's father Gerald was a high school basketball referee and baseball umpire in Maryland for 35 years, and his brother Jason coaches lacrosse at the NCAA level.
