= Ike Anigbogu =

American basketball player (born 1998)

No. 13 – Universo Treviso Basket
- Position: Center
- League: Lega Basket Serie A

Personal information
- Born: October 17, 1998 (age 28) San Diego, California, U.S.
- Listed height: 6 ft 9 in (2.06 m)
- Listed weight: 252 lb (114 kg)

Career information
- High school: Centennial (Corona, California)
- College: UCLA (2016–2017)
- NBA draft: 2017: 2nd round, 47th overall pick
- Drafted by: Indiana Pacers
- Playing career: 2017–present

Career history
- 2017–2019: Indiana Pacers
- 2017–2019: →Fort Wayne Mad Ants
- 2020–2021: Erie BayHawks
- 2022–2025: Birmingham Squadron
- 2025: College Park Skyhawks
- 2025–2026: Vanoli Cremona
- 2026–present: Universo Treviso Basket
- Stats at NBA.com
- Stats at Basketball Reference

Christopher Ike Anigbogu (born October 17, 1998) is an American professional basketball player for Universo Treviso Basket of the Italian Lega Basket Serie A (LBA). He played college basketball for one season with the UCLA Bruins. As a freshman, he was a key reserve for a Bruins squad that advanced to the Sweet 16 of the NCAA tournament. After the season, Anigbogu was selected by the Indiana Pacers in the second round of the 2017 NBA draft with the 47th overall pick. He played two seasons for the Pacers.

== Early life ==
Anigbogu was born in San Diego, California, to Nigerian parents Chris and Veronica Anigbogu. He attended Temescal Canyon High in Lake Elsinore as a freshman and played on their junior varsity team. The following year, he transferred to Centennial High in Corona, where he was also enrolled in the International Baccalaureate program. A skinny, 6-foot-7-inch (2.01 m) sophomore, he averaged two points and 2.5 rebounds per game as the Huskies advanced to the state finals.

As a junior in 2015, Anigbogu led the team to the state regional finals, where the Huskies lost to Chino Hills, who were led by Lonzo Ball. In his senior year, he was limited by injuries and a family emergency. Anigbogu took three weeks off to attend an uncle's funeral in Nigeria. During the playoffs, he was limited by an injured knee. For the season, the Huskies were 20–5 when Anigbogu played. He finished with averages of 19 points, 11 rebounds and 3 blocks.

== College career ==
Ranked nationally as a consensus top-50 recruit, Anigbogu attended the University of California, Los Angeles (UCLA), where he was part of a Bruins freshmen class that included more heralded five-star players like Ball and T. J. Leaf. Anigbogu and Leaf had played on the same Amateur Athletic Union (AAU) team, the Compton Magic, who had also been coached by UCLA assistant David Grace. The newcomers were expected to help turn around a program that a year earlier had suffered its fourth losing season in the previous 68 years.

Anigbogu missed the first five games of the 2016–17 season when he underwent knee surgery after tearing his right meniscus in practice. The Bruins' most intimidating player, he returned to provide UCLA a physical presence they lacked. Standing at 6 feet 10 inches (2.08 m) and 250 pounds (110 kg), Anigbogu provided highlight-reel dunks and blocks. Despite never starting as a backup to junior center Thomas Welsh, he became arguably their top defender.

After spraining his left foot during practice, Anigbogu missed UCLA's opener in the NCAA tournament against Kent State, but returned in the second round to score six points and block a shot in just seven minutes in a win over Cincinnati. The Bruins finished the season with 31 wins after being eliminated in the Sweet 16. For the year, Anigbogu averaged 4.7 points, 4.0 rebounds, and 1.2 blocks in 13 minutes per game, and made 56 percent of his field goals His 35 blocks ranked third on the team while his minutes played were less than half as many as Welsh (43 blocks) and Leaf (39). Projected to be a late first-round pick, Anigbogu announced after the season that he would declare for the 2017 NBA draft. Even with his limited playing time and raw offensive skills, he was valued for his athleticism and potential as a standout defender.

== Professional career ==
=== Indiana Pacers (2017–2019) ===
Working out for the Indiana Pacers in his fourth pre-draft tryout, Anigbogu twisted his right knee, which precluded him from participating in any further workouts leading up to the draft. His draft stock fell over concerns about his knee, and the Pacers selected him in the second round with the 47th overall pick. He was joined in Indiana by UCLA teammate Leaf, who the Pacers had selected in the first round. Anigbogu had surgery to repair cartilage in his knee and missed the NBA Summer League while rehabbing. He made his NBA debut on October 20, 2017, playing two minutes in a 114–96 loss to the Portland Trail Blazers. At just 19 years old, he was the youngest player in the NBA in 2017–18. In his first season, he played 11 games with the Pacers, and had multiple assignments to their NBA G League affiliate, the Fort Wayne Mad Ants.

During the offseason, Anigbogu missed his second straight summer league after undergoing minor surgery on his knee. He played just three games for the Pacers in 2018–19 before they waived him to complete a deal at the NBA trade deadline on February 7, 2019. He had spent most of his time in the G League and was playing well, averaging 11.1 points, 9.5 rebounds and 1.9 blocks in 21 games with Fort Wayne. However, he missed several games due to knee soreness.

=== Erie BayHawks (2020–2021) ===
On January 31, 2020, the Erie BayHawks—the G League affiliate of the New Orleans Pelicans—acquired Anigbogu off waivers. He played six games and averaged 9.5 points and 4.8 rebounds.

Anigbogu signed with New Orleans in December 2020, but he was waived after the preseason. He rejoined the BayHawks for the 2020–21 G League season, scheduled to be played in a bubble in Orlando, Florida, due to the COVID-19 pandemic. On March 1, he was waived after suffering a season-ending injury.

=== Birmingham Squadron (2022; 2024–2025) ===
On January 20, 2022, Anigbogu was acquired via returning player rights by the Birmingham Squadron. However, he was waived on February 28 after suffering a season-ending injury.

On January 12, 2024, Aninogbu returned to the Squadron.

=== Vanoli Cremona (2025–2026) ===
On July 6, 2025, he signed with Vanoli Cremona of the Italian Lega Basket Serie A (LBA).

=== Universo Treviso Basket (2026–present) ===
On September 21, 2026, he signed with Universo Treviso Basket of the Italian Lega Basket Serie A (LBA).

== Career statistics ==
Legend
| GP | Games played | GS | Games started | MPG | Minutes per game |
| FG% | Field goal percentage | 3P% | 3-point field goal percentage | FT% | Free throw percentage |
| RPG | Rebounds per game | APG | Assists per game | SPG | Steals per game |
| BPG | Blocks per game | PPG | Points per game | **Bold** | Career high |

=== NBA ===
==== Regular season ====
| Year | Team | GP | GS | MPG | FG% | 3P% | FT% | RPG | APG | SPG | BPG | PPG |
|---|---|---|---|---|---|---|---|---|---|---|---|---|
| 2017–18 | Indiana | **11** | 0 | **2.7** | **.444** | — | **.833** | .8 | .0 | **.1** | **.3** | **1.2** |
| 2018–19 | Indiana | 3 | 0 | 2.0 | .000 | — | — | **1.0** | **.3** | .0 | **.3** | 0.0 |
| Career | | 14 | 0 | 2.6 | .333 | — | .833 | .9 | .1 | .1 | .3 | 0.9 |

=== NBA G League ===
==== Regular season ====
| Year | Team | GP | GS | MPG | FG% | 3P% | FT% | RPG | APG | SPG | BPG | PPG |
|---|---|---|---|---|---|---|---|---|---|---|---|---|
| 2017–18 | Fort Wayne | 20 | 20 | 24.5 | .525 | .000 | **.703** | 6.4 | **1.1** | .3 | 1.7 | 8.7 |
| 2018–19 | Fort Wayne | **21** | **21** | **27.2** | .468 | .000 | .647 | **9.6** | .7 | **.4** | **1.9** | **11.1** |
| 2019–20 | Erie | 6 | 0 | 13.7 | **.615** | **.455** | .500 | 4.8 | .5 | .3 | .8 | 9.5 |
| Career | | 47 | 41 | 24.3 | .504 | .385 | .661 | 7.6 | .8 | .4 | 1.7 | 9.9 |

=== College ===
| Year | Team | GP | GS | MPG | FG% | 3P% | FT% | RPG | APG | SPG | BPG | PPG |
|---|---|---|---|---|---|---|---|---|---|---|---|---|
| 2016–17 | UCLA | 29 | 0 | 13.0 | .564 | — | .535 | 4.0 | .2 | .2 | 1.2 | 4.7 |
