= T. J. Leaf =

Israeli-American basketball player (born 1997)

- Leaf with Maccabi Tel Aviv in 2026

No. 22 – Maccabi Tel Aviv
- Position: Power forward / center
- League: Israeli Basketball Premier League; EuroLeague

Personal information
- Born: April 30, 1997 (age 29) Tel Aviv, Israel
- Listed height: 2.09 m (6 ft 10 in)
- Listed weight: 222 lb (101 kg)

Career information
- High school: Foothills Christian (El Cajon, California)
- College: UCLA (2016–2017)
- NBA draft: 2017: 1st round, 18th overall pick
- Drafted by: Indiana Pacers
- Playing career: 2017–present

Career history
- 2017–2020: Indiana Pacers
- 2017: →Fort Wayne Mad Ants
- 2021: Portland Trail Blazers
- 2022: Guangzhou Loong Lions
- 2022–2024: Beijing Ducks
- 2024–2025: Nanjing Monkey Kings
- 2025–present: Maccabi Tel Aviv

Career highlights
- First-team All-Pac-12 (2017); Pac-12 All-Freshman team (2017); McDonald's All-American (2016)
- Stats at NBA.com
- Stats at Basketball Reference
Medals
Men's basketball
Representing Israel
FIBA Europe U18 Championship Division B
Silver medal – second place	2015 Austria	National team

Ty Jacob Leaf (Hebrew: טיי ג'ייקוב ליף; born April 30, 1997) is an Israeli-American professional basketball player for Maccabi Tel Aviv of the Israeli Basketball Premier League and the EuroLeague. After playing one season of college basketball for the UCLA Bruins, he was selected by the Indiana Pacers in the first round of the 2017 NBA draft with the 18th overall pick.

Leaf was named an All-American as a high school senior in 2016. As a UCLA freshman in 2016–17, he earned first-team all-conference honors in the Pac-12. He began his NBA career with three seasons in Indiana, but was unable to carry over his college success. He joined the Portland Trail Blazers as a free agent in 2021. Leaf also played for Israel's Under-18 junior national team at the 2015 FIBA Europe Under-18 Championship B Division.

== Early life ==
Leaf was born in Tel Aviv, Israel, to Karen and Brad Leaf. His father was playing professional basketball in Israel at the time, and he enjoyed a 17-year career in the country. Leaf lived his first 2 1/2 years in Tel Aviv before growing up in Lakeside, California, in San Diego County. His father coached him in summer leagues prior to high school. Despite possessing the height of a power forward—he stood 6 ft 3 in (1.91 m) in junior high—Leaf played on the perimeter to develop guard skills. His father wanted him to be versatile like the big men that he had competed against as a pro in Europe.

Leaf attended Foothills Christian High School in El Cajon, California, where he also played under his father. As a junior, Leaf averaged 27.4 points, 14.2 rebounds, 4.8 assists, 1.8 steals and 2.7 blocks per game, leading Foothills Christian to the San Diego Section Division II championship. Cal-Hi Sports named him their Division II State Player of the Year.

In his senior year, Leaf led the team to a No. 3 state ranking after averaging 28.4 points, 12.4 rebounds, and 5.1 assists. He scored a season-high 44 points in a loss to Chino Hills, who were led by future teammate Lonzo Ball. Leaf earned McDonald's and Ballislife All-American honors, and USA Today named him second-team All-USA. He was a runner-up to Ball for California Mr. Basketball. Leaf finished his high school career second all-time in the San Diego Section in both points (3,022) and rebounds (1,476). He trailed only his brother, Troy, in points (3,318 for Foothills Christian from 2007 to 2010) and Angelo Chol in rebounds (1,732 with Hoover from 2008 to 2011).

== College career ==
Leaf originally committed in 2014 to play for Arizona under coach Sean Miller. He tried out for the United States under-19 national team, also coached by Miller, but was cut in training camp in June 2015. In August, Leaf decommitted from Arizona, leading to speculation that the cut by Miller was a motivating factor. He signed with UCLA three months later, choosing them over Oregon and San Diego State. A consensus five-star and overall top-20 recruit, he joined his Amateur Athletic Union (AAU) teammates from the Compton Magic, Ike Anigbogu and Kobe Paras, who also committed to UCLA. The Bruins recruiting class also included Ball, who along with Leaf were both expected to lead a UCLA turnaround in 2016–17 after the Bruins finished just 15–17 the year before.

On December 5, 2016, Leaf was named Pac-12 Player of the Week following his performance at Kentucky, where he registered 17 points, 13 rebounds and 5 assists. He and Ball were named to the mid-season watch list for the John R. Wooden Award, given annually to the top college player in the nation; UCLA was one of just five schools with two candidates on the list. The two were also among 30 on the midseason watch list for the Naismith College Player of the Year. On February 1, 2017, Leaf scored a career-high 32 points on 14-for-18 shooting and added 14 rebounds in a 95–79 win over Washington State, which ended a two-game losing streak for No. 11 UCLA. He missed the regular season finale with a sprained left ankle, which he suffered five minutes into the prior game against Washington.

Leaf finished the season as UCLA's leading scorer with 16.3 points per game. He also averaged 8.2 rebounds and ranked third in field goal percentage (61.7) among Power Five conference players. He received honorable mention from the Associated Press (AP) for their All-American team, and was named first-team All-Pac-12 along with teammates Lonzo Ball and Bryce Alford. Leaf and Ball were also placed on the Pac-12 All-Freshman team. On March 30, Leaf announced that he was leaving UCLA and declaring for the 2017 NBA draft.

== Professional career ==
=== Indiana Pacers (2017–2020) ===
Leaf was selected by the Indiana Pacers in the first round of the 2017 NBA draft with the 18th overall pick, and he signed a three-year contract worth $7,249,200. He was joined in Indiana by Anigbogu, who was selected by the Pacers in the second round. Leaf began 2017–18 as a fixture in the Pacers' rotation, averaging 16.2 minutes and five shots per contest through the first eight games. However, he struggled on defense, and his playing time fell as Indiana coach Nate McMillan tightened his rotation. In December 2017, Leaf was assigned to the Fort Wayne Mad Ants of the NBA G League and averaged 23.3 points and 8.3 rebounds in a three-game stint before returning to the Pacers. He finished with 52 games played during the regular season, but saw limited playing time towards the end as the Pacers qualified for the playoffs.

In 2018–19, Leaf's minutes were limited playing behind big men Myles Turner, Domantas Sabonis, Thaddeus Young and Kyle O'Quinn. On February 28, 2019, he had a career-high 18 points in a season-high 22 minutes in a 122–115 win over the Minnesota Timberwolves. Leaf was forced into the game early after Turner and O'Quinn got into foul trouble guarding the Wolves' Karl-Anthony Towns, and held his own defensively against the All-Star center. In the regular-season finale, Leaf had career highs of 28 points and 10 rebounds for his first career double-double in a 135–134 win over the Atlanta Hawks.

Leaf worked on his jump shot during the offseason leading up to the 2019–20 season. Indiana exercised their contract option on his fourth year, guaranteeing him $4.3 million for 2020–21. On November 3, 2019, Leaf had 13 points and a career-high 15 rebounds while getting extra time as a backup center in a 108–95 win over the Chicago Bulls. However, he fell out of the rotation by the end of the month. He played in just 28 games during the season after appearing in over 50 in each of his first two seasons. Leaf did not develop into his projected role as a stretch four, making just 26.5% of his three-point field goals in his last two years with Indiana. In three seasons with the Pacers, he averaged 3.3 points and 2.0 rebounds per game.

On November 25, 2020, Leaf was traded along with a 2027 second-round draft pick to the Oklahoma City Thunder in exchange for guard Jalen Lecque. On December 18, Leaf was waived by the Thunder after their final preseason game.

=== Portland Trail Blazers (2021) ===
On April 13, 2021, Leaf signed a two-way contract with the Portland Trail Blazers.

=== Guangzhou Loong Lions (2022) ===
On January 12, 2022, Leaf joined the Guangzhou Loong Lions of the CBA, and averaged 25 points, 11.7 rebounds and 1.7 blocks per game.

=== Beijing Ducks (2022–2024) ===
On October 2, 2022, Leaf signed with the Beijing Ducks.

=== Nanjing Tongxi Monkey Kings (2024–2025) ===
On September 20, 2024, Leaf signed with the Nanjing Monkey Kings.

=== Maccabi Tel Aviv (2025–present) ===
On June 29, 2025, Leaf signed with Maccabi Tel Aviv of the Ligat HaAl and the EuroLeague. He signed a three-year deal with the team.

In February 2026, Leaf underwent surgery after having a dislocated shoulder.

== National team career ==
After being cut by coach Miller from the U.S. Under-19 junior national team in 2015, Leaf joined Israel's under-18 junior national team the following month in July, to play in the 2015 FIBA Europe Under-18 Championship Division B in Austria. Although Israel lost 73–72 in the Division B final, Leaf was named tournament's MVP, after averaging 16.1 points per game, on 55 percent shooting, to go along with 8.4 rebounds per game in nine games played. In 2018 he said "Playing for the senior [Israel] national team and helping the guys is one goal of my career."

== Career statistics ==
Legend
GP	Games played	GS	Games started	MPG	Minutes per game
FG%	Field goal percentage	3P%	3-point field goal percentage	FT%	Free throw percentage
RPG	Rebounds per game	APG	Assists per game	SPG	Steals per game
BPG	Blocks per game	PPG	Points per game	**Bold**	Career high

=== NBA ===
==== Regular season ====
Year	Team	GP	GS	MPG	FG%	3P%	FT%	RPG	APG	SPG	BPG	PPG
2017–18	Indiana	53	0	8.7	.471	**.429**	.625	1.5	.2	.1	.1	2.9
2018–19	Indiana	**58**	**1**	**9.0**	**.541**	.258	.613	2.2	**.4**	.2	**.3**	**3.9**
2019–20	Indiana	28	**1**	7.9	.419	.278	.438	**2.5**	.3	**.4**	.1	3.0
2020–21	Portland	7	0	5.0	.500	–	**1.000**	.7	.1	.3	.1	1.7
Career		146	2	8.5	.492	.341	.585	1.9	.3	.2	.2	3.3

==== Playoffs ====
Year	Team	GP	GS	MPG	FG%	3P%	FT%	RPG	APG	SPG	BPG	PPG
2018	Indiana	1	0	4.0	–	–	–	.0	.0	.0	.0	.0
2019	Indiana	1	0	**10.0**	.000	.000	**1.000**	**3.0**	.0	.0	.0	**2.0**
2021	Portland	**3**	0	2.3	**.750**	–	–	1.0	.0	.0	.0	**2.0**
Career		5	0	4.2	.429	.000	1.000	1.2	.0	.0	.0	1.6

=== College ===
Year	Team	GP	GS	MPG	FG%	3P%	FT%	RPG	APG	SPG	BPG	PPG
2016–17	UCLA	35	35	29.9	.617	.466	.679	8.2	2.4	.6	1.1	16.3

=== China ===
Year	Team	GP	GS	MPG	FG%	3P%	FT%	RPG	APG	SPG	BPG	PPG
2021–22	Guangzhou	15	11	32.1	.569	.300	.804	11.7	2.9	2.1	1.9	25.0

== Accomplishments and awards ==
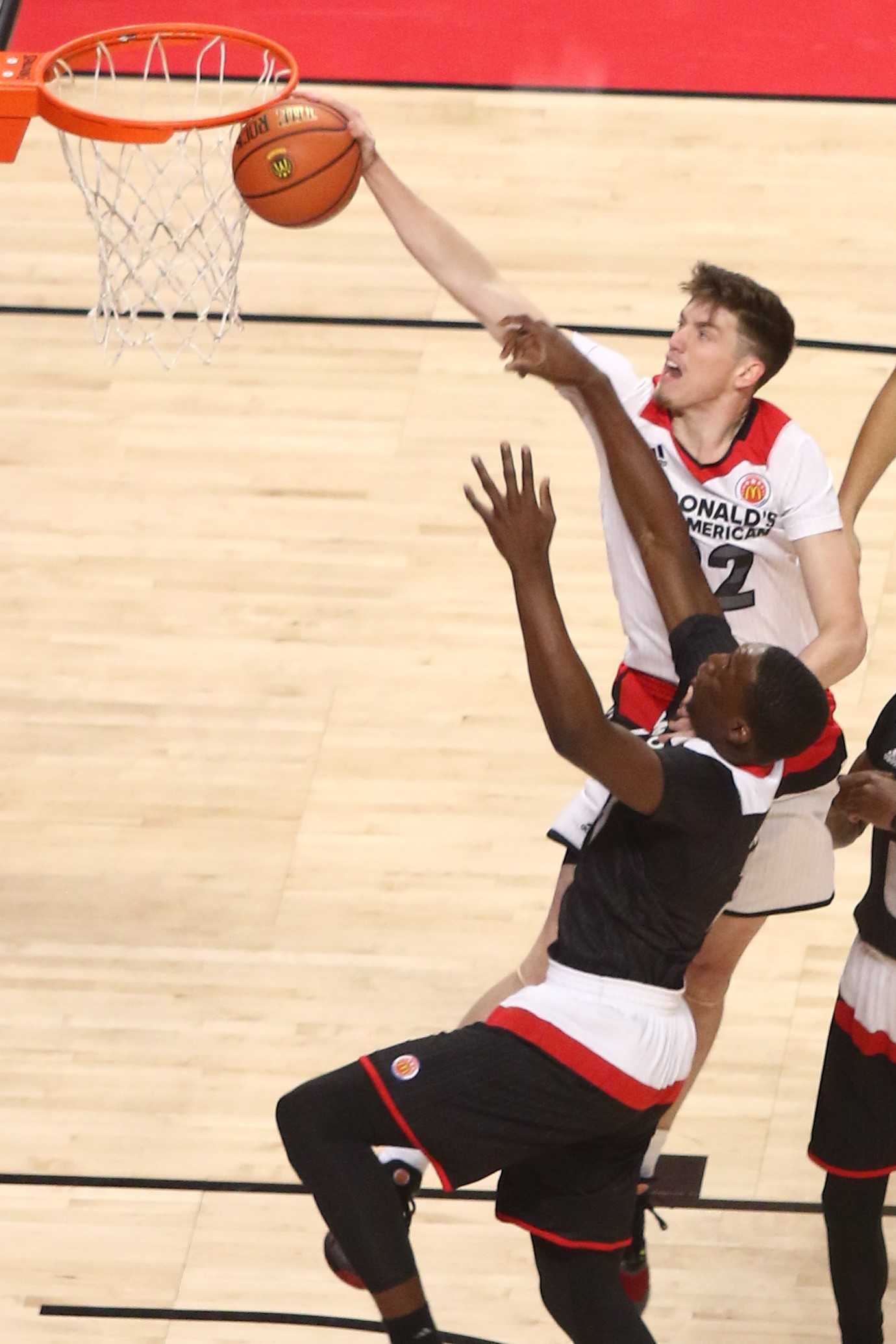
Leaf in 2016 McDonald's All-American Game

College

- AP honorable mention All-American (2017)
- First-team All-Pac-12 (2017)
- Pac-12 All-Freshman team (2017)

High school

- McDonald's All-American (2016)
- Ballislife All-American (2016)
- Second-team USA Today All-USA (2016)
- Second-team Naismith All-American (2016)
- Cal-Hi Sports Division II State Player of the Year (2015)
- 2× All-CIF San Diego Section Player of the Year (2015, 2016)

== See also ==
- List of Israeli Americans
