= Kobi Simmons =

American-Ivorian basketball player (born 1997)

- Simmons with Baskonia in 2026

No. 2 – Baskonia
- Position: Point guard / shooting guard
- League: Liga ACB; EuroLeague

Personal information
- Born: July 4, 1997 (age 29) Atlanta, Georgia, U.S.
- Listed height: 1.95 m (6 ft 5 in)
- Listed weight: 86 kg (190 lb)

Career information
- High school: St. Francis (Milton, Georgia)
- College: Arizona (2016–2017)
- NBA draft: 2017: undrafted
- Playing career: 2017–present

Career history
- 2017–2018: Memphis Grizzlies
- 2017–2018: →Memphis Hustle
- 2018–2019: Canton Charge
- 2019: Cleveland Cavaliers
- 2019: →Canton Charge
- 2019–2021: Greensboro Swarm
- 2021–2022: Stal Ostrów Wielkopolski
- 2022–2023: Greensboro Swarm
- 2023: Charlotte Hornets
- 2023: →Greensboro Swarm
- 2023–2024: Raptors 905
- 2024: Toronto Raptors
- 2024–2025: Zhejiang Golden Bulls
- 2025: Gigantes de Carolina
- 2025–present: Baskonia

Career highlights
- McDonald's All-American (2016)
- Stats at NBA.com
- Stats at Basketball Reference

Kobi Jordan Simmons (born July 4, 1997) is an American-born naturalized Ivorian professional basketball player for Saski Baskonia of the Spanish Liga ACB and the EuroLeague. Simmons played college basketball for the Arizona Wildcats.

== High school career ==
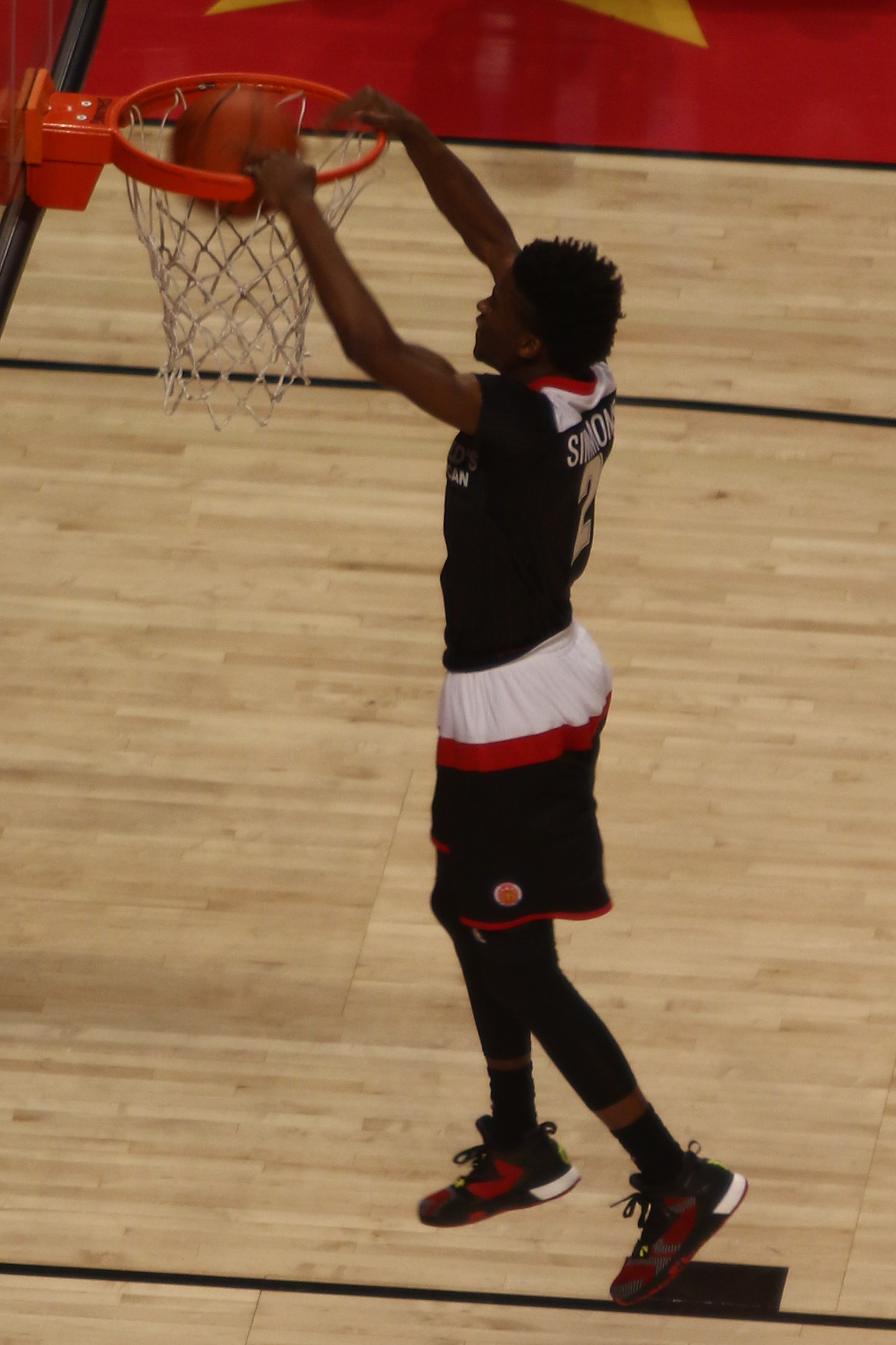
Simmons dunks the Basketball at the 2016 McDonald's All-American Game

Simmons attended St. Francis in Milton, Georgia. In his freshman year, Simmons averaged 14.1 points, 3.9 assists, 2.7 rebounds, and 2.0 steals per game. As a sophomore in 2013–14, he averaged 17.4 points, 4.8 assists, and 3.5 rebounds per game.

As a junior, Simmons averaged 21.2 points per game, 4.2 assists per game, and 2.9 rebounds per game in 32 games. In the summer of his junior year, Simmons played in the 2015 Under Armour Elite 24 Game in Brooklyn, New York. He was later invited to camps such as the Adidas Nations and Adidas Euro-camps. As a senior, Simmons averaged 26.0 points, 4.0 rebounds and 4.0 assists per outing. In his last game for the Knights, he scored 36 points, including seven three-pointers in the semi-final game against Milton High School. Throughout his high school career, Simmons led St. Francis to 100 victories, two state championships and Four state championship appearances. On January 16, Simmons committed to Arizona. In January 2016, Simmons was named a McDonald's All-American and played in the 2016 McDonald's All-American Game on March 30 at the United Center in Chicago, where he recorded 12 points, 2 assists, and 1 steal in a 114–107 loss to the West Team. Simmons was rated as a five-star recruit and ranked 20th in the Class of 2016 according to ESPN. He also earned Atlanta Journal-Constitution Player of the Year honors. His number has been retired at St. Francis.

== College career ==
Simmons played one season of college basketball for Arizona. On November 11, 2016, Simmons scored 18 points, tying the most points in an NCAA debut for an Arizona player in a decade, leading the Wildcats to victory in a 65–63 win against No. 12 ranked Michigan State in the Armed Forces Classic. On January 21, 2017, Simmons recorded 20 points, 6 rebounds, and 5 assists in a 96–85 win against No. 3 ranked UCLA. As the No. 2 seed in the Pac-12 Conference men's basketball tournament, Arizona defeated Colorado in the quarter-finals and UCLA in the semi-finals. On March 11, 2017, Simmons and Arizona defeated Oregon 83–80 to win the Pac-12 Conference Championship. The Wildcats entered the NCAA tournament as the No. 2 Seed in the West Region, where Arizona defeated North Dakota in the first round and St. Mary's in the second round before losing to Xavier in the Sweet Sixteen. Simmons appeared in 37 games (19 starts) as a freshman and averaged 8.7 points, 1.6 rebounds and 2.0 assists in 23.5 minutes per game.

On April 5, 2017, Simmons declared for the NBA draft, forgoing his final three years of college eligibility.

== Professional career ==
=== Memphis Grizzlies (2017–2018) ===
Simmons split playing time between the Grizzlies and their new G League affiliate, the Memphis Hustle. His NBA debut with the Grizzlies came on November 29, 2017, in a 95–104 loss to the San Antonio Spurs. He played a total of 32 games (12 starts) for the Grizzlies, averaging 6.1 points, 2.1 assists and 1.6 rebounds per contest. He converted all 25 of his 25 free throws during his NBA stint. Simmons was waived by the Grizzlies on August 28, 2018. In G League play, Simmons averaged 15.1 points, 3.9 assists and 2.7 rebounds in 26 outings for the Memphis Hustle.

=== Canton Charge (2018–2019) ===
On September 14, 2018, Simmons signed with the Cleveland Cavaliers. On October 13, he was waived by the Cavaliers. He then joined the Cavs’ NBA G League affiliate, the Canton Charge.

=== Cleveland Cavaliers (2019) ===
On January 27, 2019, the Cleveland Cavaliers signed Simmons to a 10-day contract, but was later waived by the Cleveland Cavaliers on February 4.

=== Greensboro Swarm (2019–2021) ===
On September 16, 2019, the Charlotte Hornets announced that they had signed with Simmons. On October 20, the Charlotte Hornets announced that they had converted Simmons' contract into a two-way contract.

For the 2020–21 season, Simmons rejoined the Greensboro Swarm of the G League where he averaged 18 points, six assists, and five rebounds.

=== Stal Ostrów Wielkopolski (2021–2022) ===
On September 25, 2021, Simmons signed with Stal Ostrów Wielkopolski of the Polish Basketball League.

=== Charlotte Hornets / Return to Greensboro (2022–2023) ===
On November 4, 2022, Simmons was named to the opening night roster for the Greensboro Swarm. He signed a two-way contract with the Charlotte Hornets on March 30, 2023. On April 7, Simmons signed a multi-year contract with the Hornets.

On August 30, 2023, Simmons was waived by the Hornets.

=== Toronto Raptors / Raptors 905 (2023–2024) ===
On November 22, 2023, Simmons signed with Raptors 905, appearing in 23 games and averaging 15.9 points, 4.9 assists, 4.1 rebounds, and 31.6 minutes.

On March 25, 2024, Simmons signed a 10-day contract with the Toronto Raptors.

On September 3, 2024, Simmons signed with Maccabi Tel Aviv of the Israeli Basketball Premier League. On September 30, Simmons was released by the team. Maccabi announced that they decided not to extend his contract for the 2024–2025 season. He had signed a short-term deal for the pre-season.

=== Zhejiang Golden Bulls (2024–2025) ===
On November 8, 2024, Simmons signed with the Zhejiang Golden Bulls of the Chinese Basketball Association (CBA). His contract expired and he was removed from the roster on January 8, 2025. On January 10, he re-signed with the Zhejiang Golden Bulls. Simmons was removed from the roster a second time on January 26.

=== Gigantes de Carolina (2025) ===
On February 17, 2025, Simmons signed with the Gigantes de Carolina of the Baloncesto Superior Nacional (BSN) for the 2025 season.

=== Saski Baskonia (2025–present) ===
On October 18, 2025, Simmons signed a two–month contract for Saski Baskonia of the Liga ACB and the EuroLeague. On December 23, the same year, Simmons extended his contact with the team for the rest of the season.

On June 16, 2026, Simmons re–signed with Baskonia on a two–year contract.

== NBA career statistics ==
Legend
GP	Games played	GS	Games started	MPG	Minutes per game
FG%	Field goal percentage	3P%	3-point field goal percentage	FT%	Free throw percentage
RPG	Rebounds per game	APG	Assists per game	SPG	Steals per game
BPG	Blocks per game	PPG	Points per game	**Bold**	Career high

=== Regular season ===
Year	Team	GP	GS	MPG	FG%	3P%	FT%	RPG	APG	SPG	BPG	PPG
2017–18	Memphis	**32**	**12**	**20.1**	.423	**.282**	**1.000**	1.6	2.1	.6	.2	**6.1**
2018–19	Cleveland	1	0	1.8	—	—	—	.0	.0	.0	.0	.0
2022–23	Charlotte	5	0	5.6	.167	.200	**1.000**	.8	1.0	.0	.4	1.0
2023–24	Toronto	4	0	16.8	**.429**	.250	—	**1.8**	**3.0**	**1.5**	**.5**	5.0
Career		42	12	17.6	.417	.269	1.000	1.5	2.0	.6	.2	5.3
