= 2016 McDonald's All-American Boys Game =

American high school basketball game

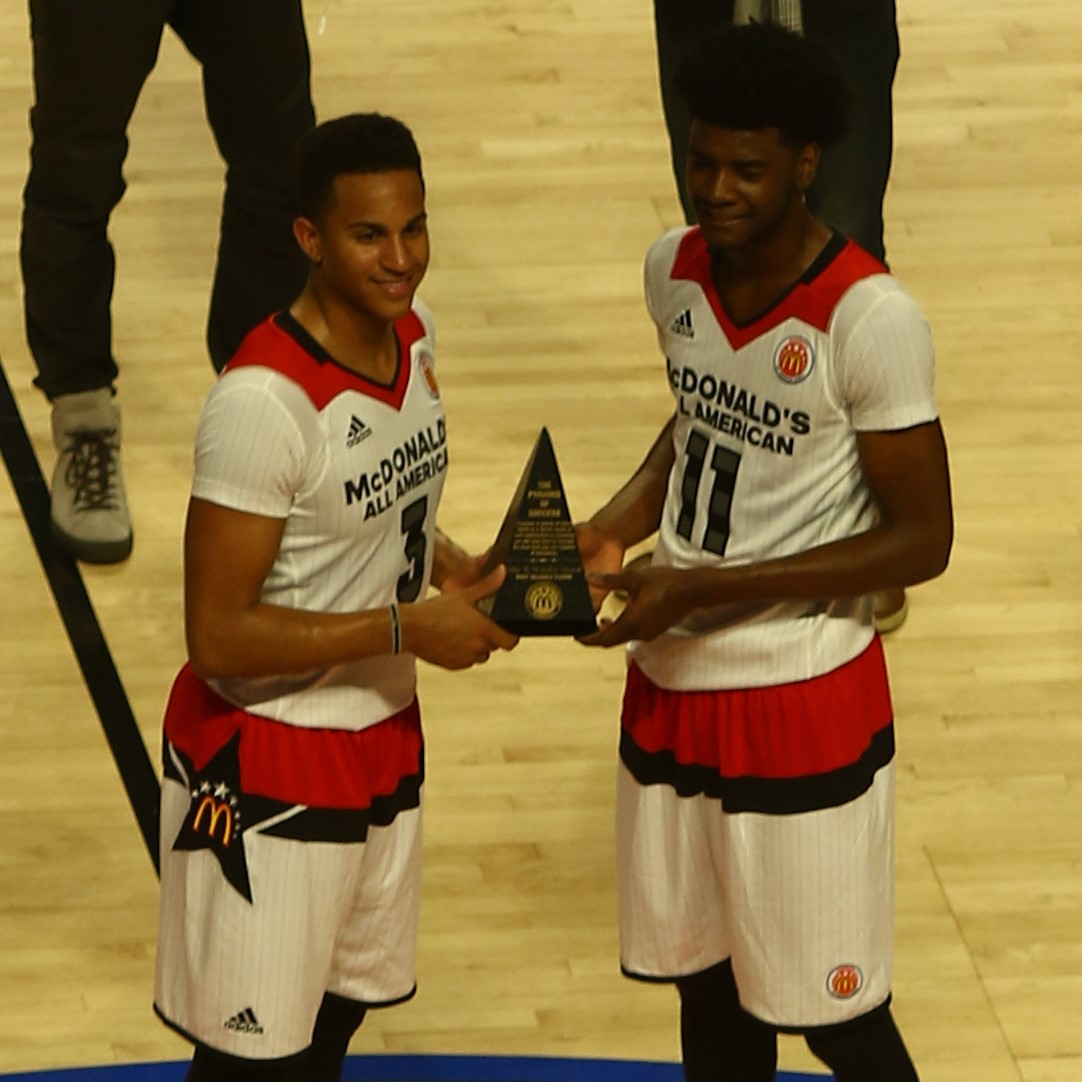
- co-MVPs Frank Jackson and Josh Jackson
East	West
107	114
	1st half	2nd half	Total
East	47	60	107
West	52	62	114
- Date: March 30, 2016
- Venue: United Center, Chicago, Illinois
- MVP: Josh Jackson; Frank Jackson
- Network: ESPN

McDonald's All-American

The 2016 McDonald's All-American Boys Game was an All-star basketball game played on Wednesday, March 30, 2016 at the United Center in Chicago, Illinois, home of the Chicago Bulls. The game's rosters features the best and most highly recruited high school boys graduating in 2016. The game is the 39th annual version of the McDonald's All-American Game first played in 1977.

The 24 players were selected from 2,500 nominees by a committee of basketball experts. They were chosen not only for their on-court skills but for their performances off the court as well. Coach Morgan Wootten, who had more than 1,200 wins as head basketball coach at DeMatha Catholic High School, was chairman of the selection committee. Legendary UCLA coach John Wooden, who had been involved in the McDonald's All American Games since its inception, served as chairman of the Games and as an advisor to the selection committee.

Proceeds from the 2016 McDonald's All American High School Basketball Games will go to Ronald McDonald House Charities (RMHC) of Central Ohio and its Ronald McDonald House program.

== Rosters ==
The rosters were announced on January 17. At the time of the roster announcement the 24 players included 22 of the top 25 players according to the 2016 ESPN 100. The two highest rated players (Jayson Tatum) were named to the East team. The West team roster was highlighted by (Josh Jackson). Duke signee Harry Giles would remain the No. 1 overall player in the 2016 high school class but was not eligible or invited to play due to an ACL tear at Oak Hill Academy which ended his senior year. Dennis Smith Jr. would become ineligible due to an injury before his senior year and enrolled early to NC State. ESPN's number 9 ranked and Florida State signee, Jonathan Isaac was an ineligible postgraduate student. Three other five-star recruits were also ineligible, number 15 ranked Rawle Alkins, number 16 ranked and Villanova signee, Omari Spellman, and number 24 ranked and Kentucky signee, Wenyen Gabriel. The highest ranked nominee not chosen was Auburn signee, Mustapha Heron.

On March 9, 2016, Lonzo Ball was named the Morgan Wootten award winner, an award given to the best male McDonald's All American player who presents an outstanding character, leadership and embodies the value of being a student-athlete in the classroom and the community. Kobi Simmons committed to Arizona on January 16 during the Spalding HoopHall Classic. On January 28, Udoka Azubuike committed to Kansas (joining Josh Jackson). On April 12, Josh Jackson committed to Kansas (joining Azubuike). On May 19, Marques Bolden selected Duke (joining Tatum and Frank Jackson). On June 3, Jarrett Allen committed to Texas (joining Jones).

=== Team West ===
ESPN Rank	Name	Height	Weight	Position	Hometown	High school	College choice
3	Josh Jackson	6-7	195	SF/SG	San Diego, CA	Justin-Siena HS	Kansas^
4	Lonzo Ball	6-6	170	PG	Chino Hills, CA	Chino Hills HS	UCLA
8	Malik Monk	6-3	185	SG	Lepanto, AR	Bentonville HS	Kentucky
9	T. J. Leaf	6-9	215	PF	El Cajon, CA	Foothills Christian HS	UCLA
11	Frank Jackson	6-3	185	SG	Alpine, UT	Lone Peak HS	Duke
14	Joshua Langford	6-5	215	PG	Huntsville, AL	Madison Academy	Michigan State
19	Jarrett Allen	6-10	235	C	Austin, TX	St. Stephen's Episcopal School	Texas^
20	Marques Bolden	6-10	240	C	Dallas, TX	DeSoto HS	Duke^
23	Dewan Huell	6-9	230	PF	Miami, FL	Miami Norland Senior HS	Miami (FL)
24	Kyle Guy	6-2	170	PG/SG	Indianapolis, IN	Lawrence Central HS	Virginia
28	Alterique Gilbert	6-0	170	PG	Lithonia, GA	Miller Grove HS	Connecticut
37	Zach Collins	6-11	220	C	Las Vegas, NV	Bishop Gorman HS	Gonzaga

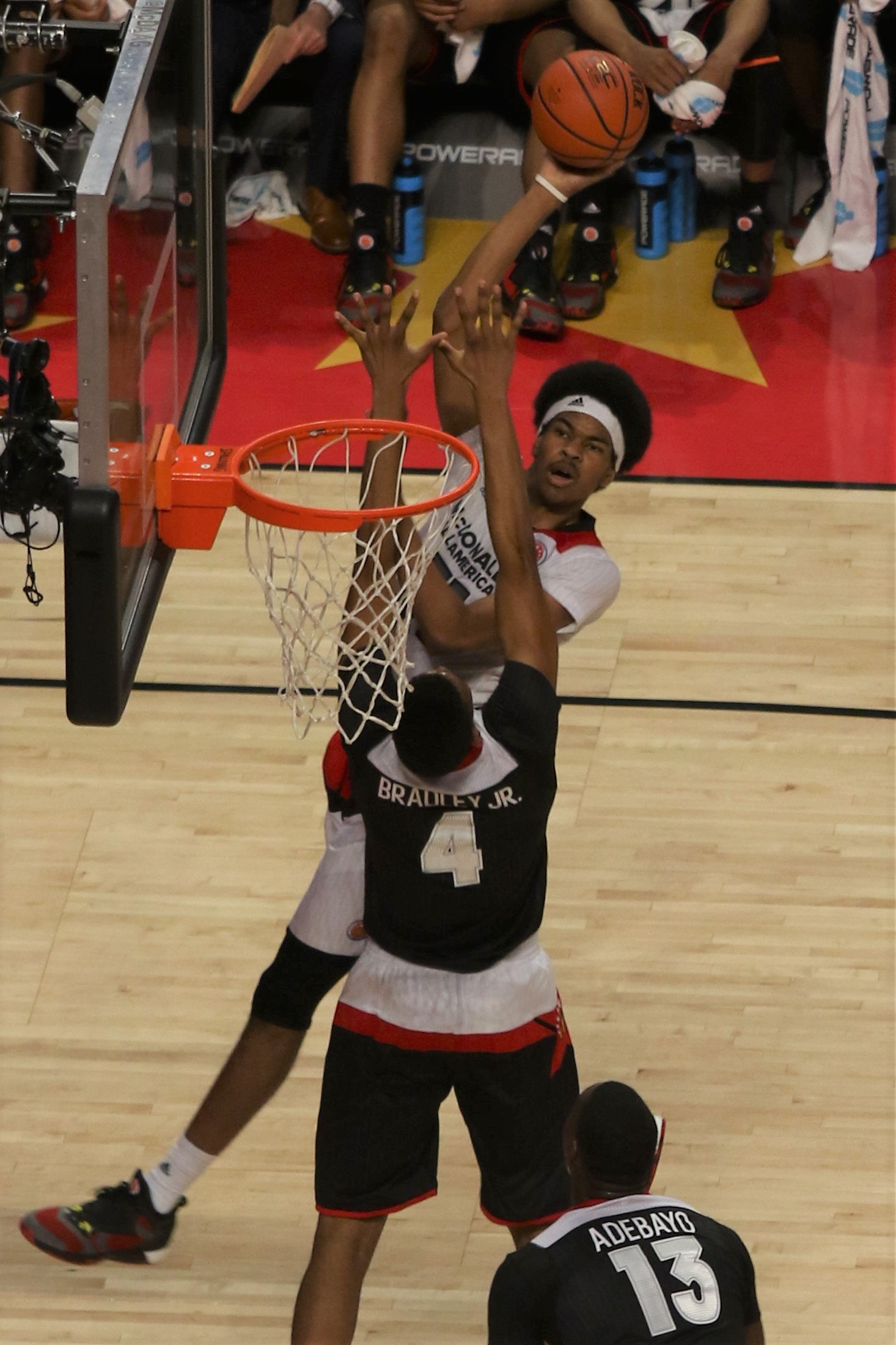
Jarrett Allen

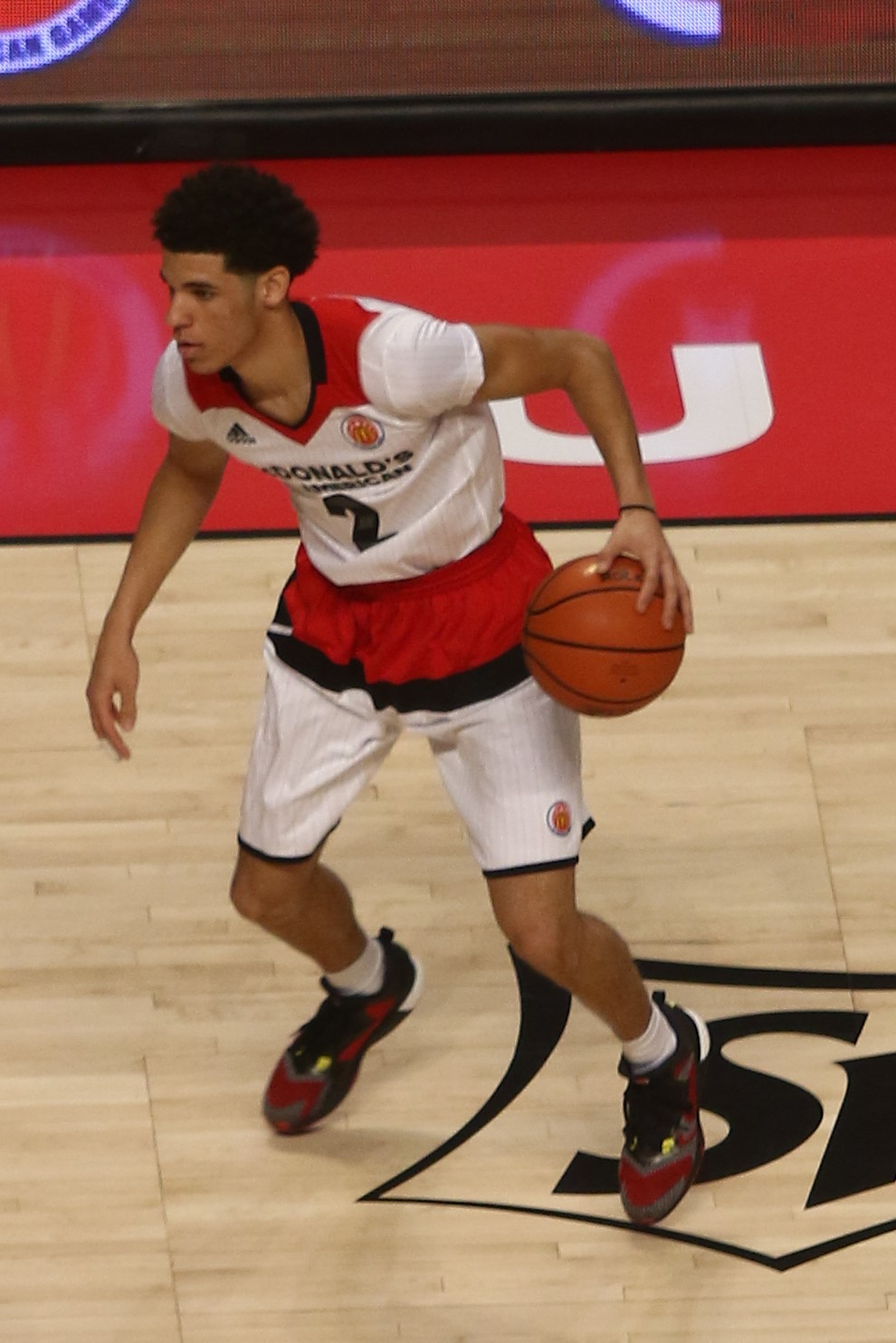
Lonzo Ball

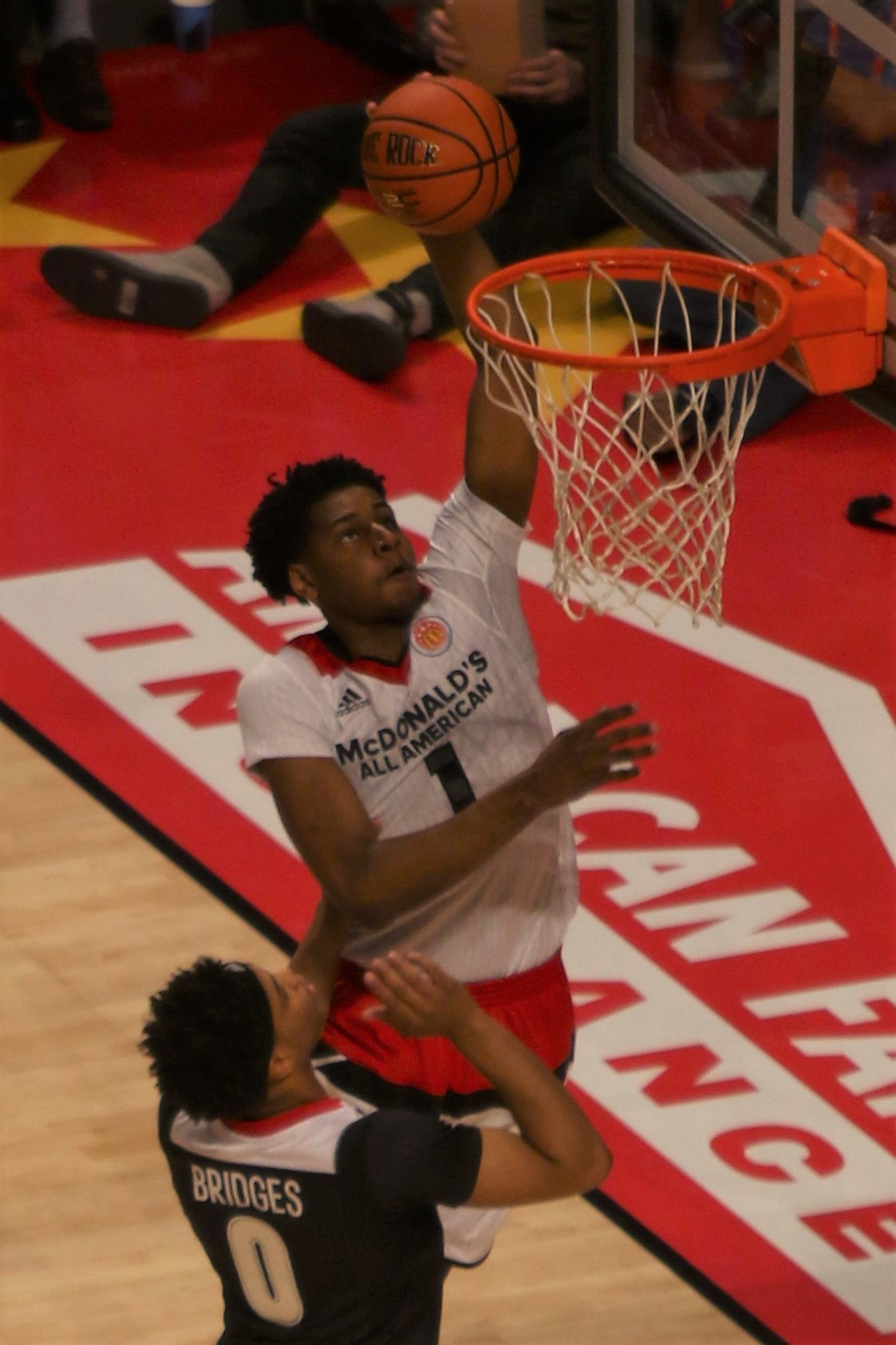
Marques Bolden

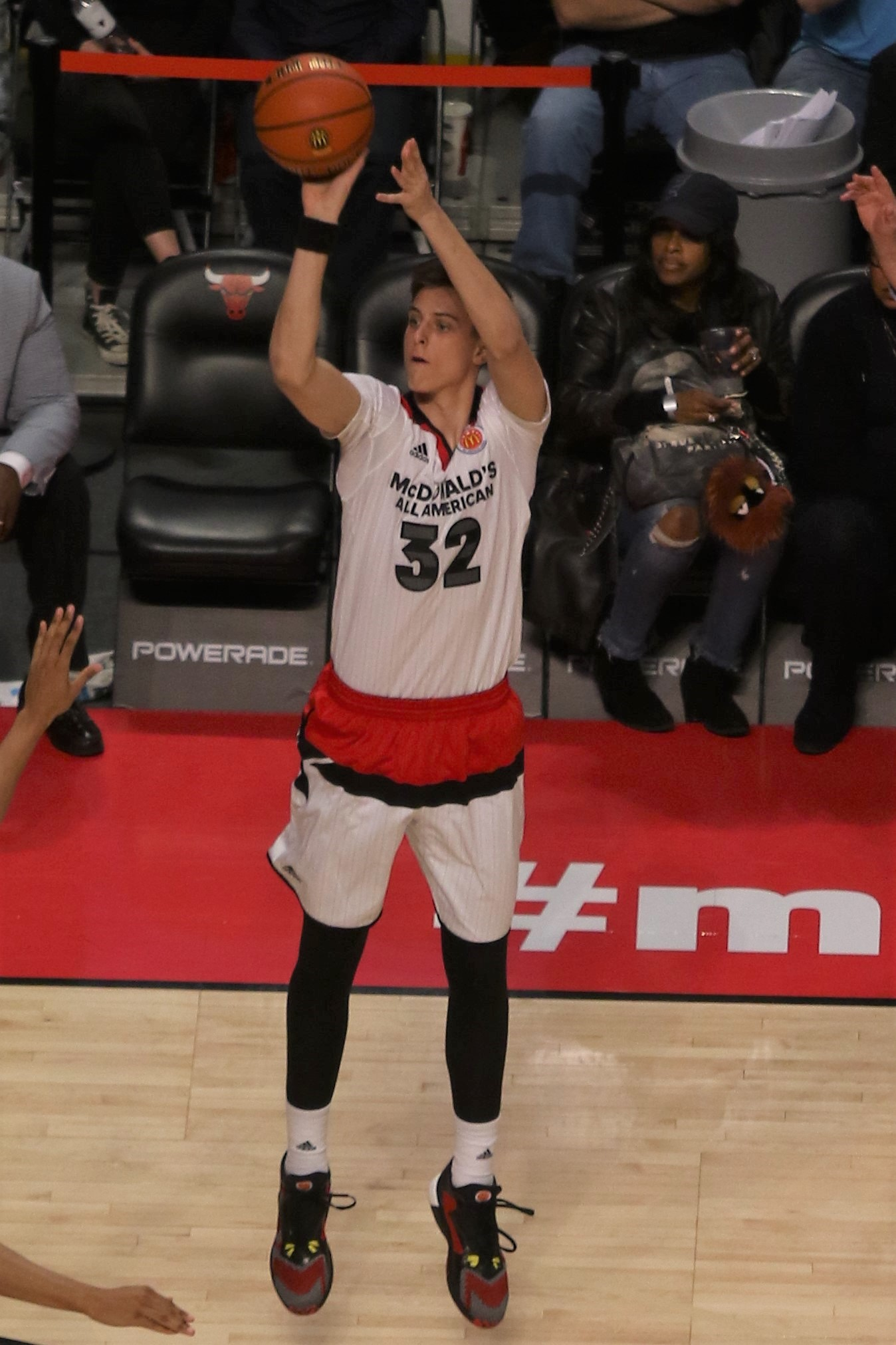
Zach Collins

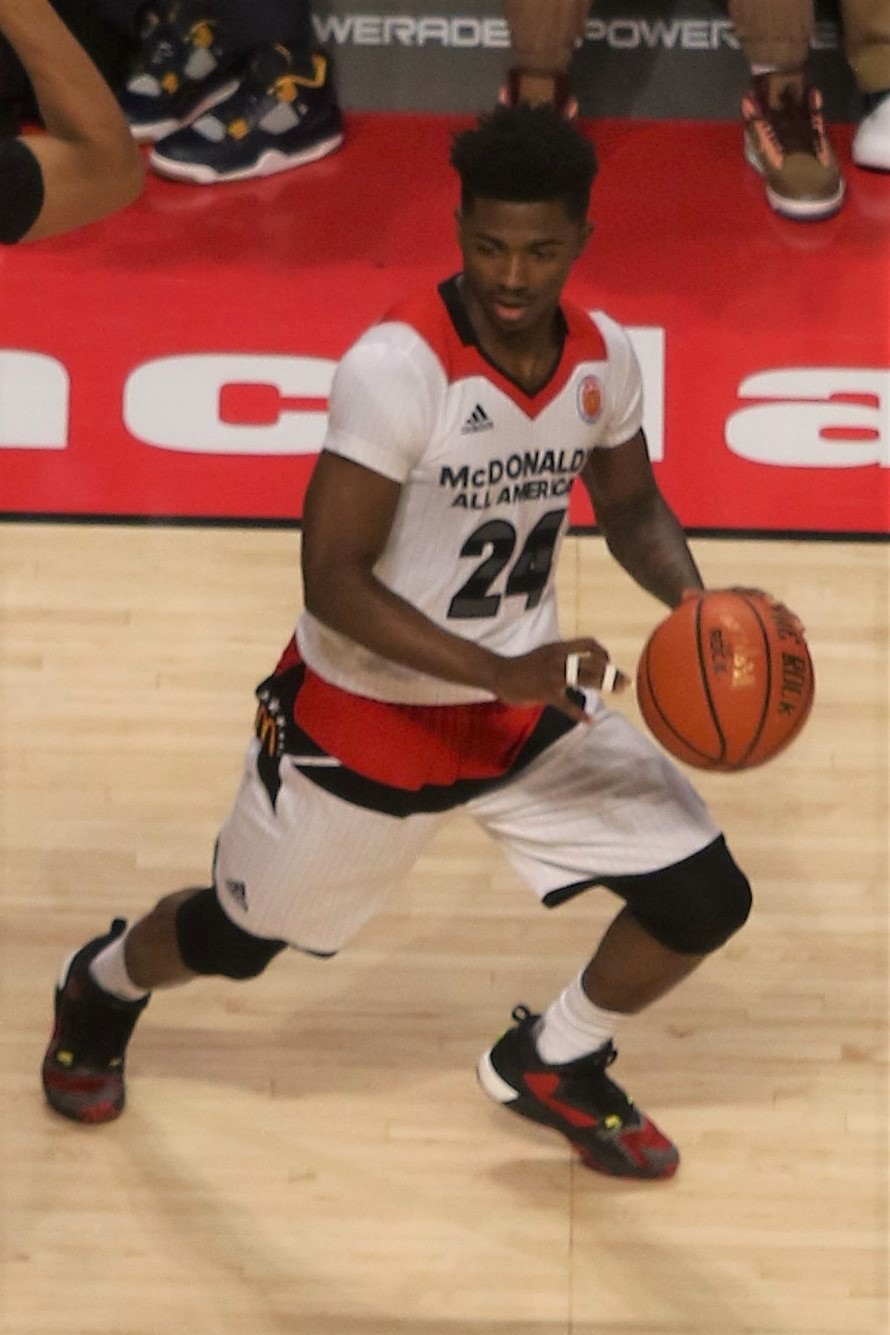
Alterique Gilbert

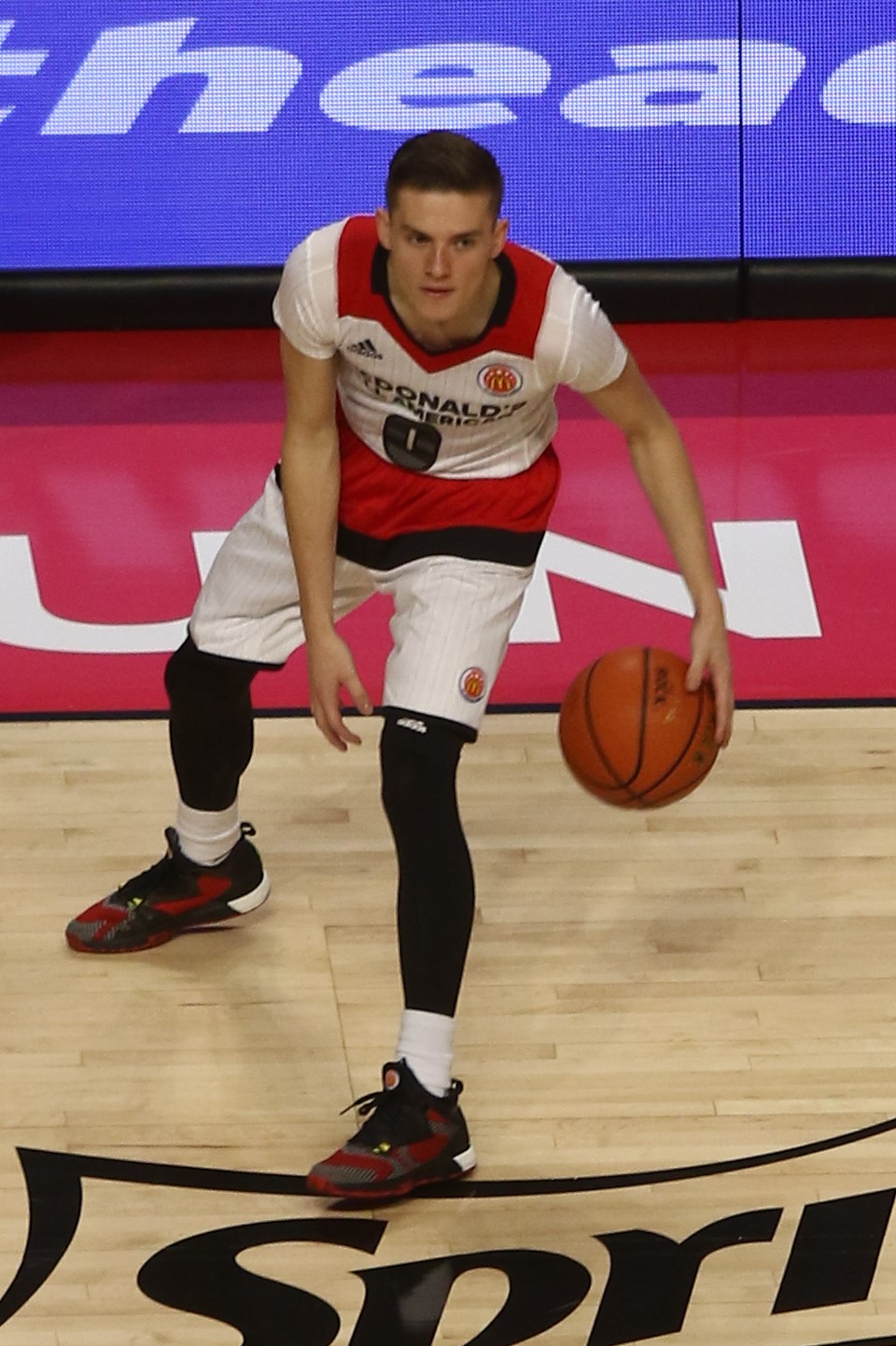
Kyle Guy

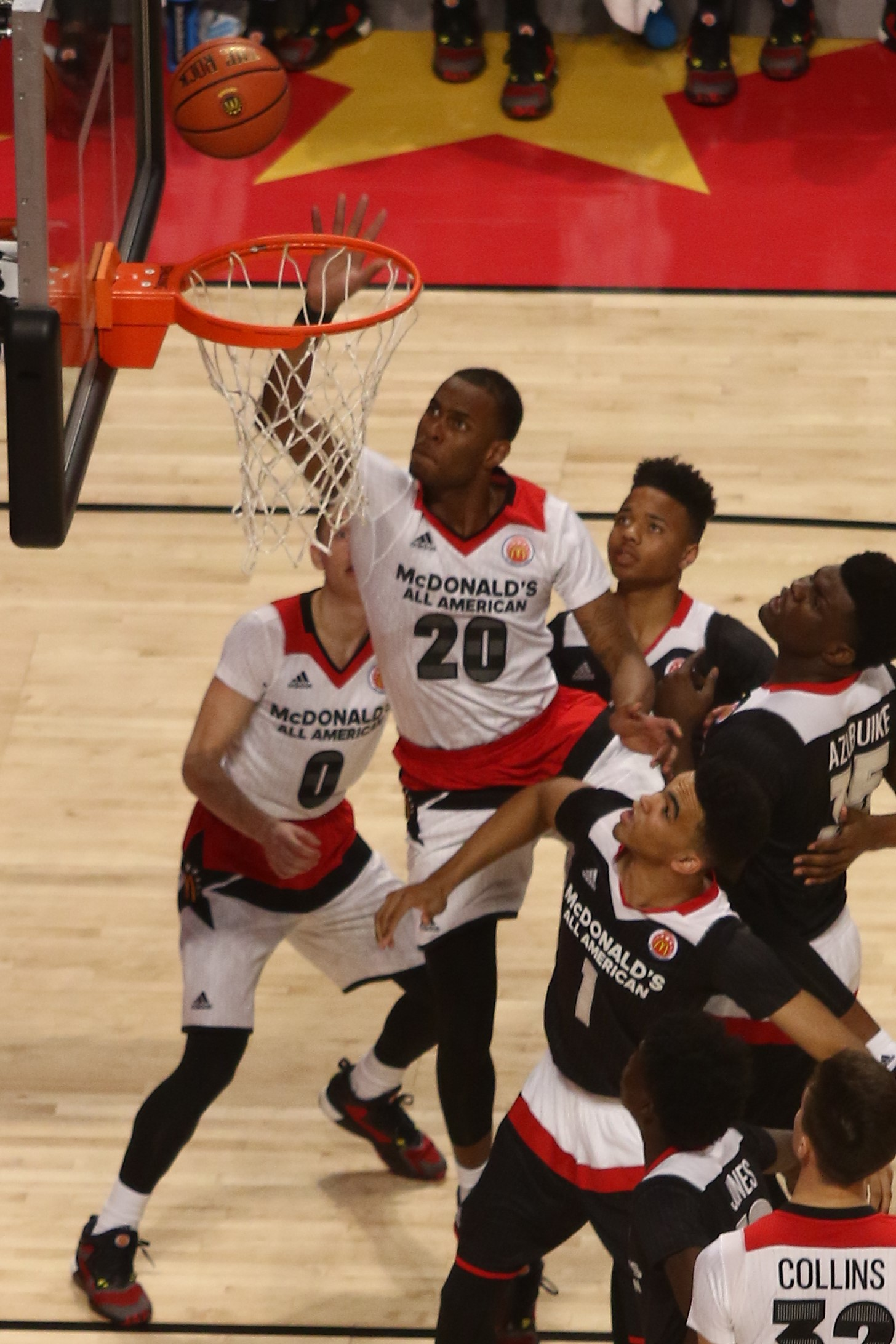
Dewan Huell

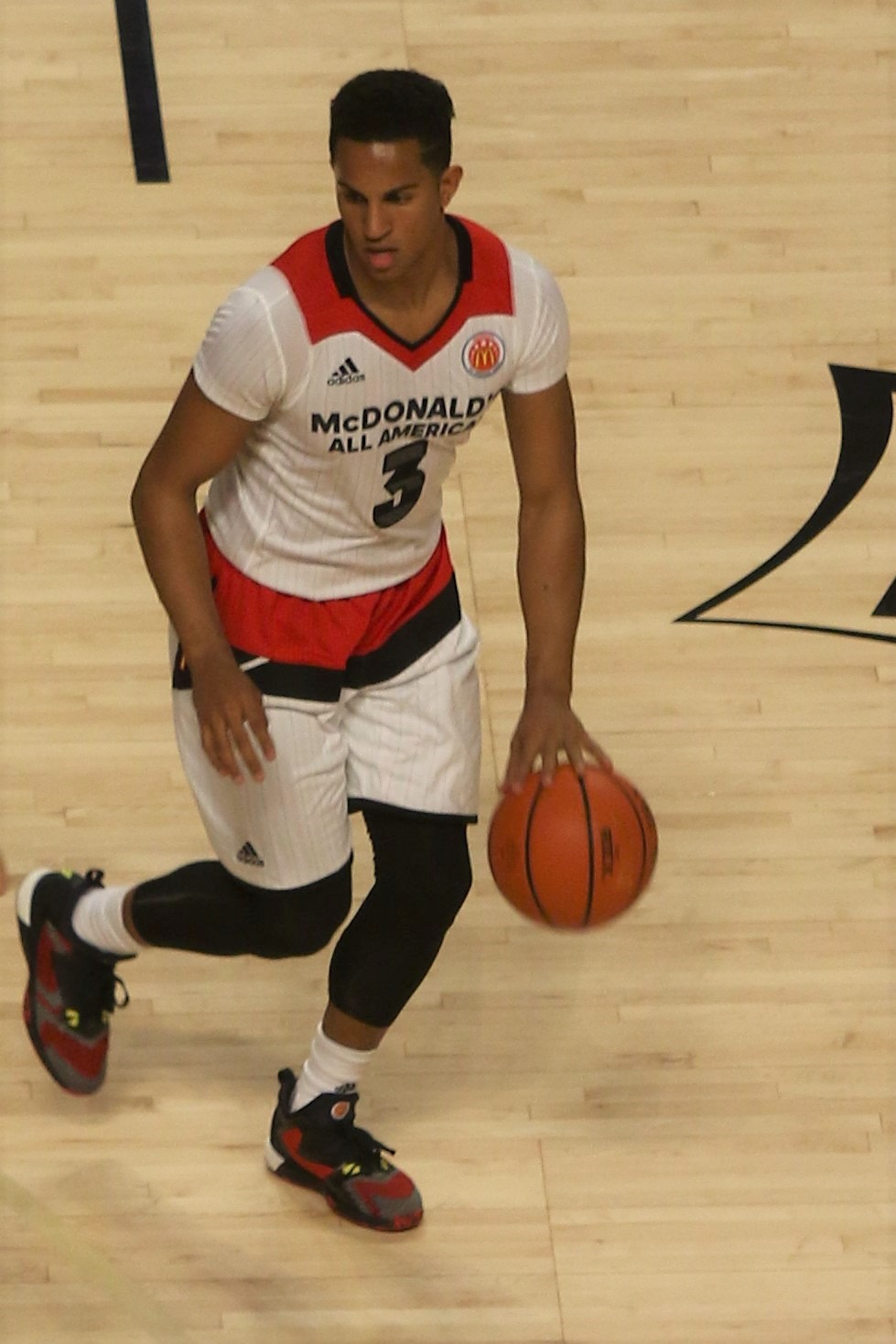
Frank Jackson

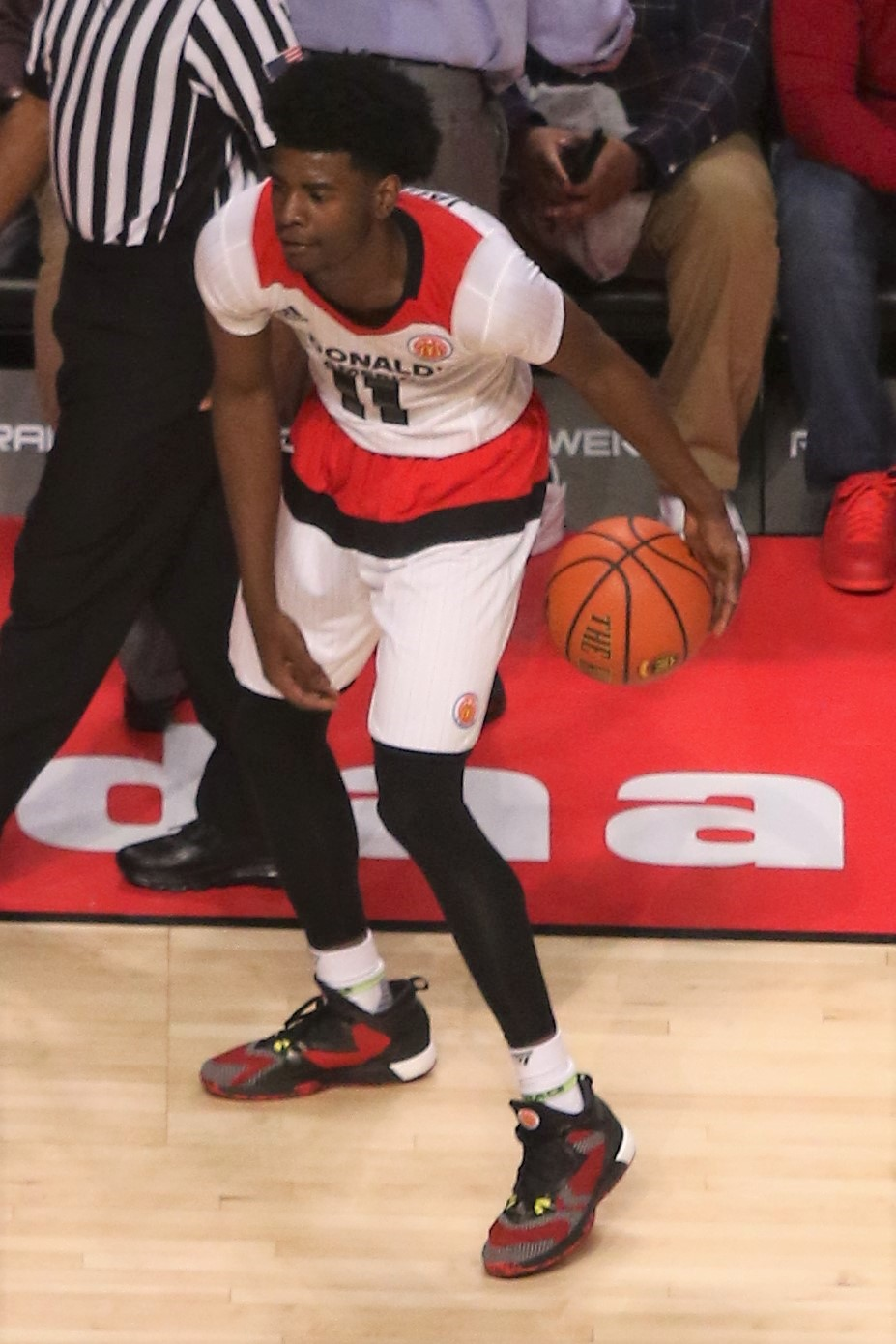
Josh Jackson

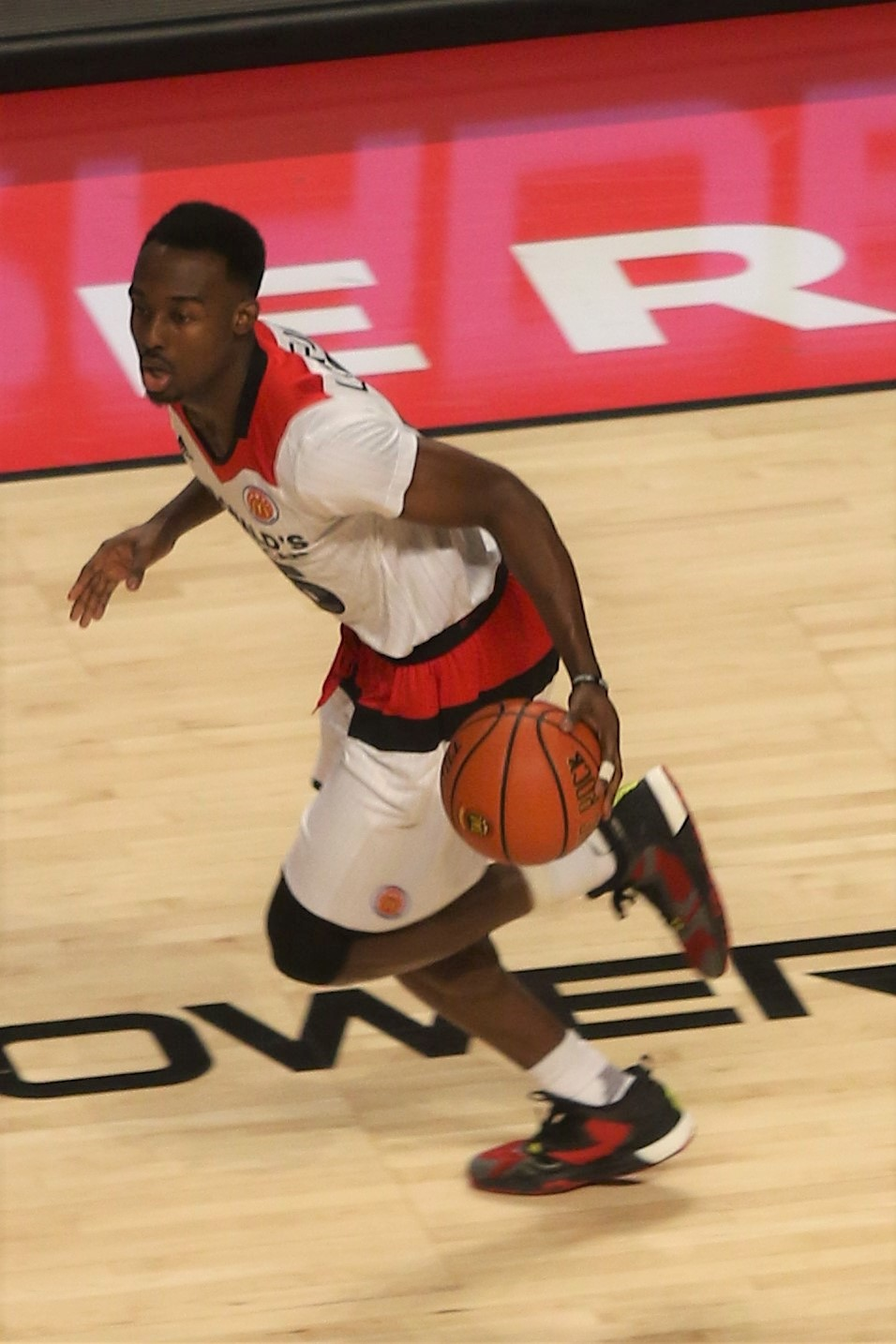
Joshua Langford

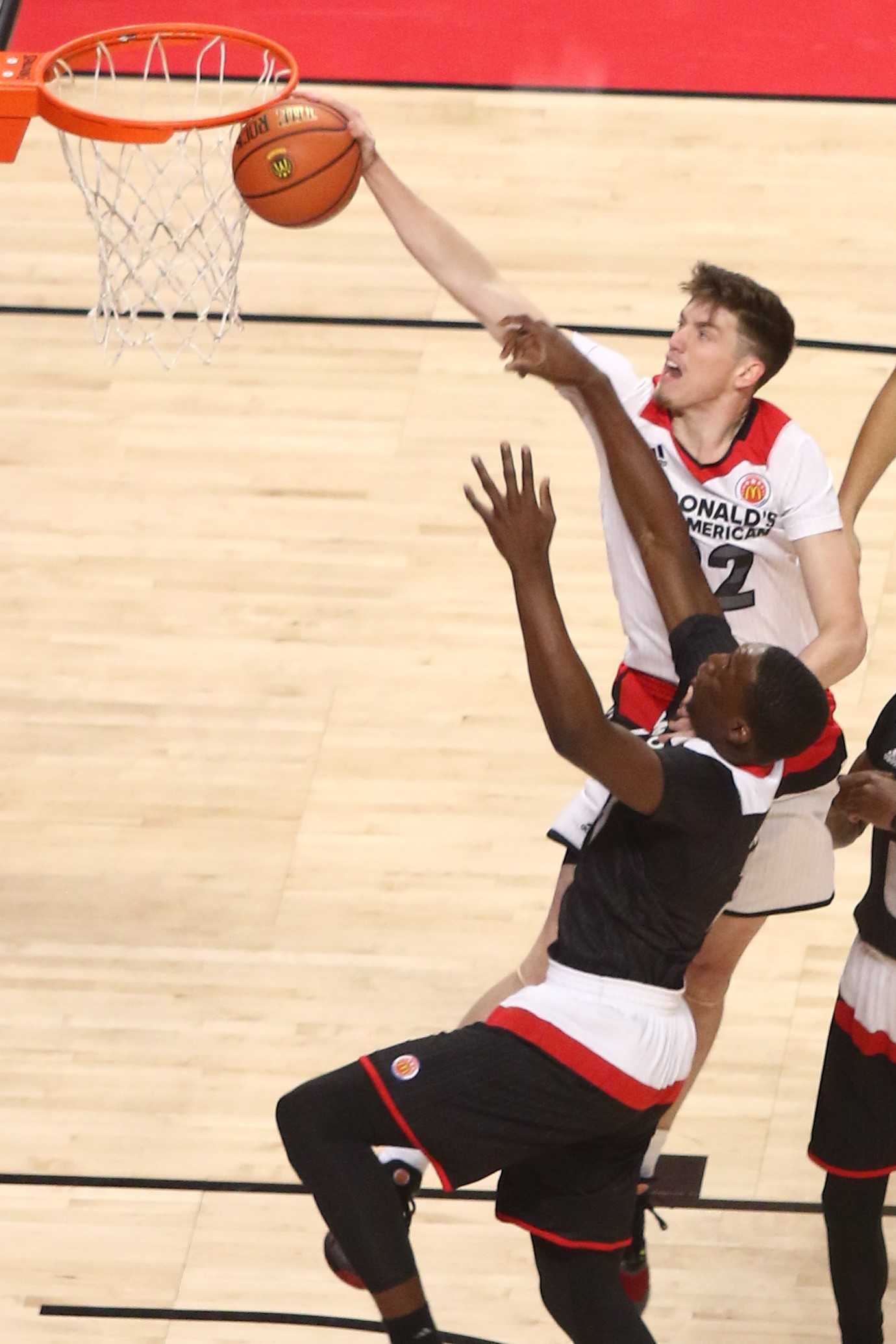
T. J. Leaf

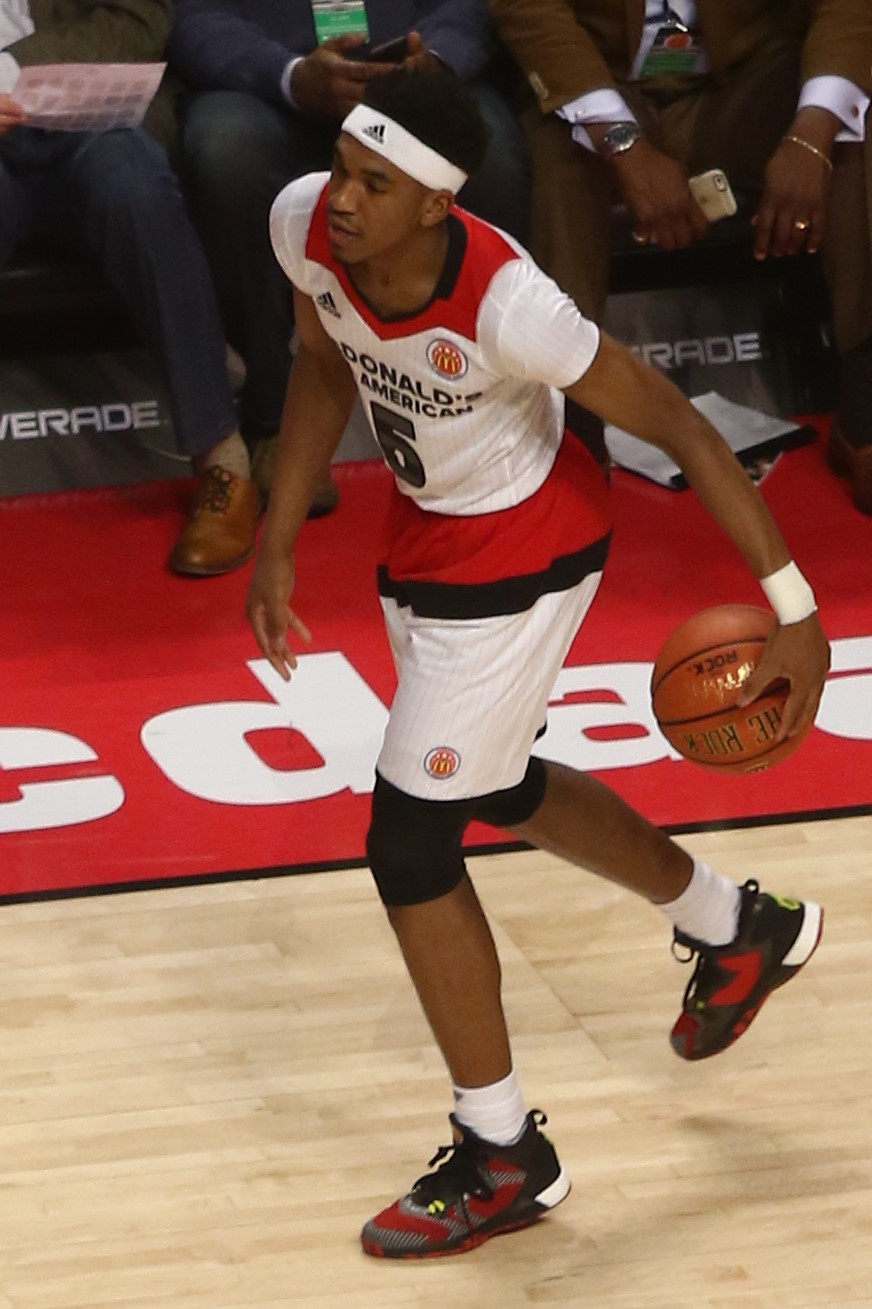
Malik Monk

The West team is coached by:

- Dale Mabrey (Head coach) (Pleasure Ridge Park High School, Louisville, KY)

=== Team East ===
ESPN Rank	Name	Height	Weight	Position	Hometown	High school	College choice
2	Jayson Tatum	6-8	205	SF	St Louis, MO	Chaminade	Duke
5	Bam Adebayo	6-10	260	PF	Pinetown, NC	High Point Christian Academy	Kentucky
6	Miles Bridges	6-7	225	SF	Flint, MI	Huntington Prep School	Michigan State
7	De'Aaron Fox	6-4	170	PG	Cypress, TX	Cypress Lakes HS	Kentucky
10	Markelle Fultz	6-4	185	G	Upper Marlboro, MD	DeMatha Catholic HS	Washington
13	Terrance Ferguson	6-7	185	G	Tulsa, OK	Advanced Preparatory International Academy	Arizona^
18	Kobi Simmons	6-6	165	PG	Atlanta, GA	St. Francis HS	Arizona
22	Udoka Azubuike	6-11	270	C	Jacksonville, FL	Potters House Christian	Kansas
21	Tony Bradley	6-11	230	PF	Bartow, FL	Bartow HS	North Carolina
27	V. J. King	6-7	179	SF	Fairfax, VA	Paul VI High School	Louisville
27	Sacha Killeya-Jones	6-11	215	PF	Chapel Hill, N.C.	Virginia Episcopal School	Kentucky
35	Andrew Jones	6-4	195	SG	Irving, TX	MacArthur HS	Texas^

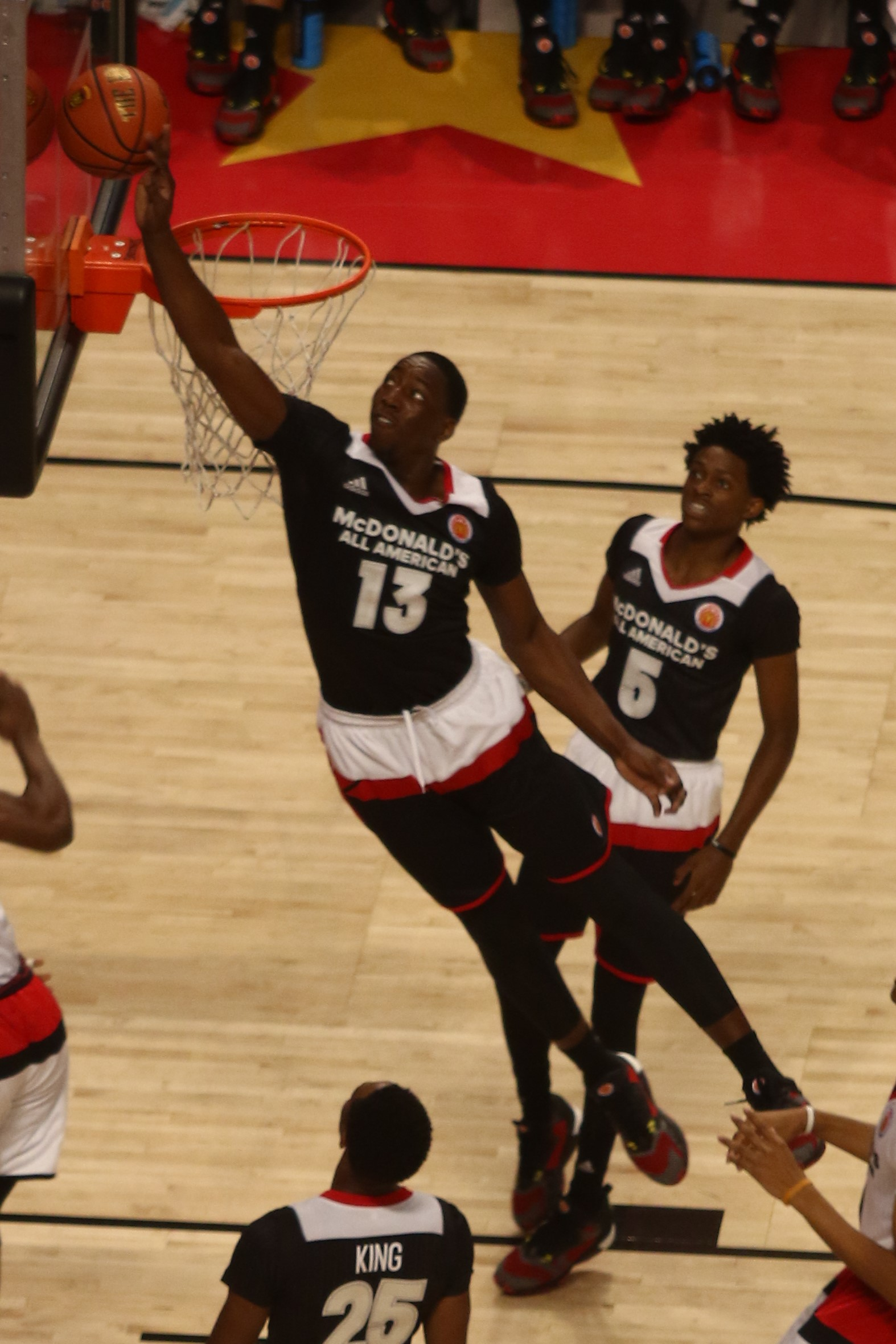
Bam Adebayo

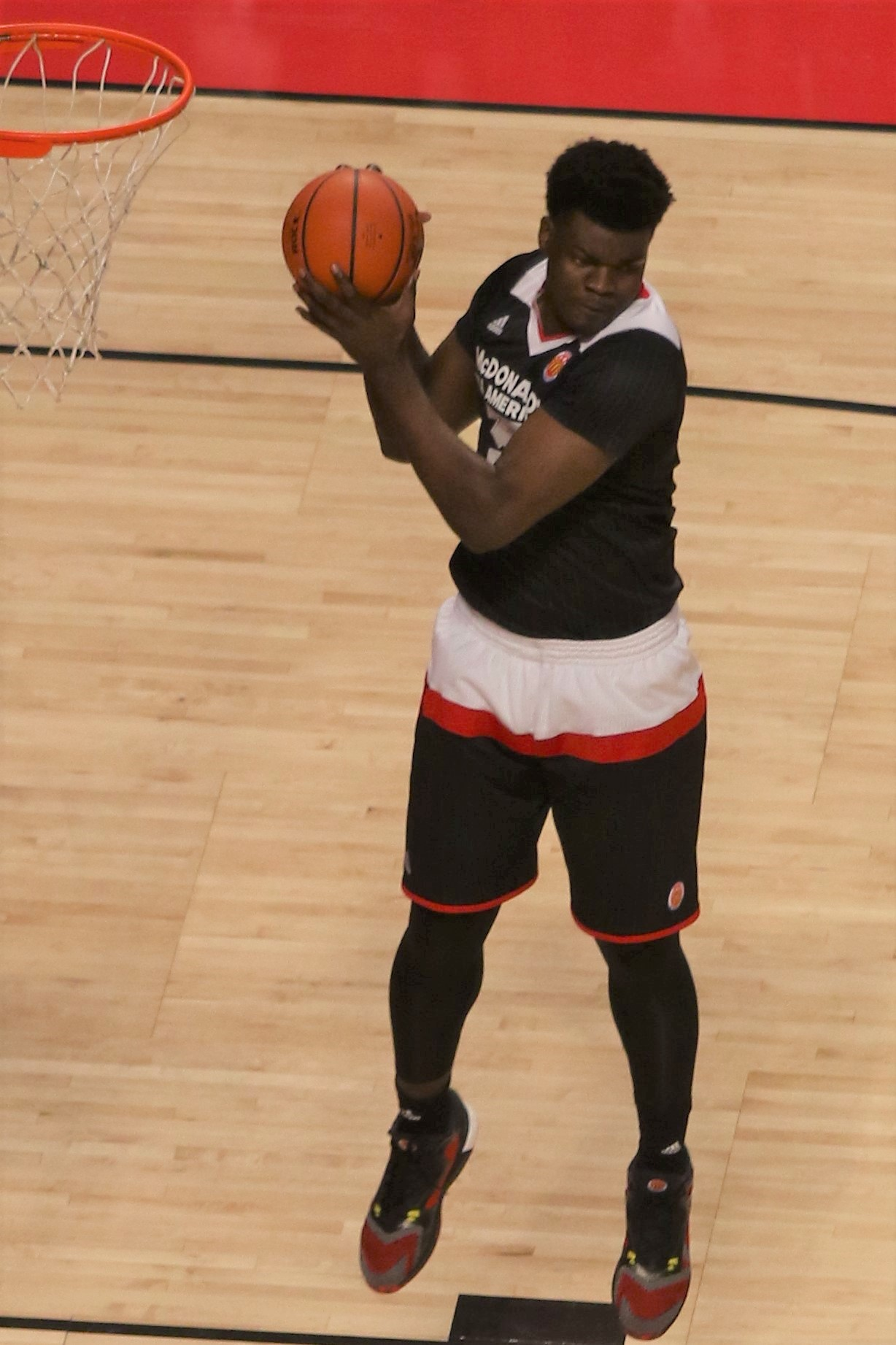
Udoka Azubuike

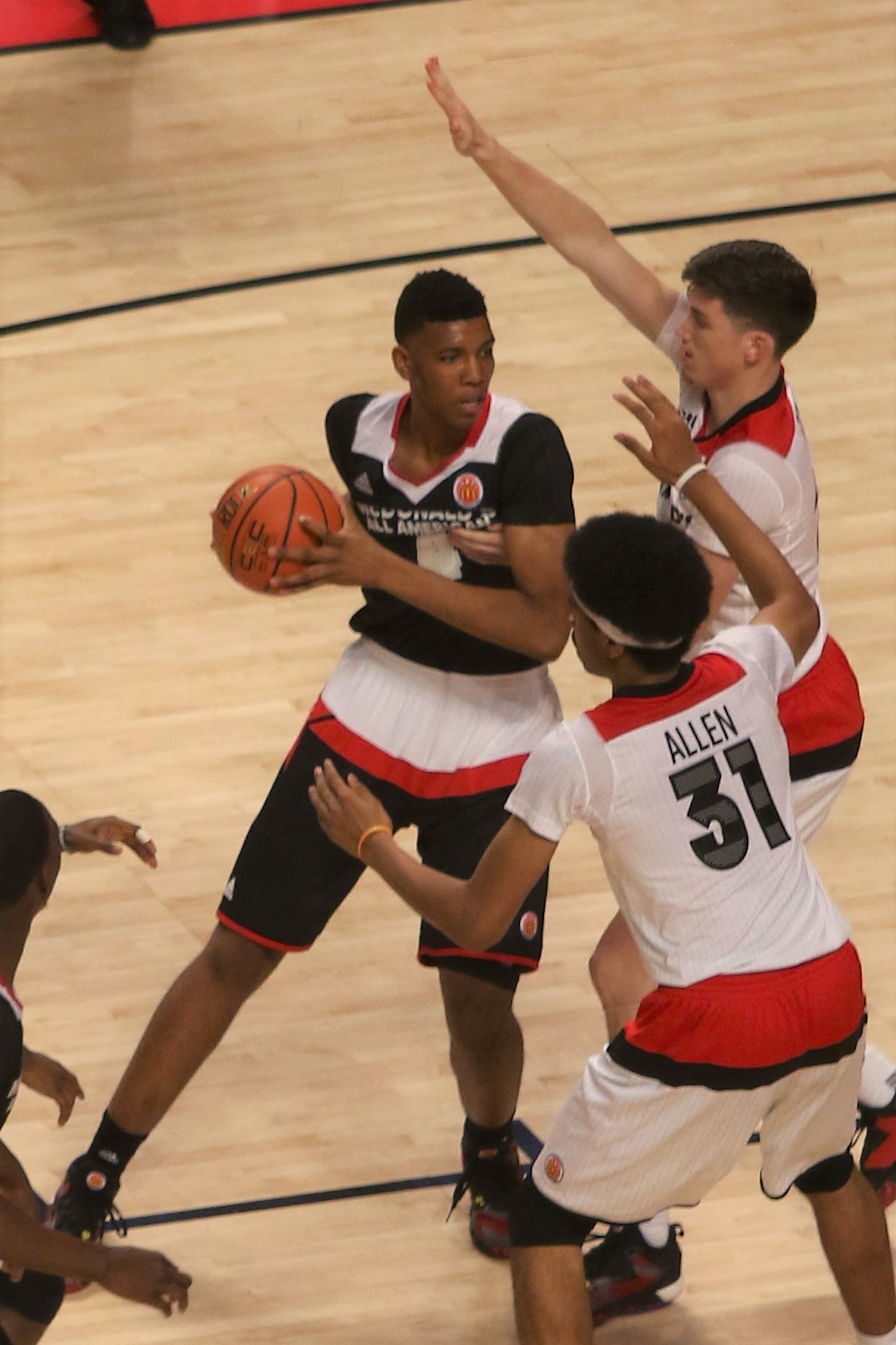
Tony Bradley

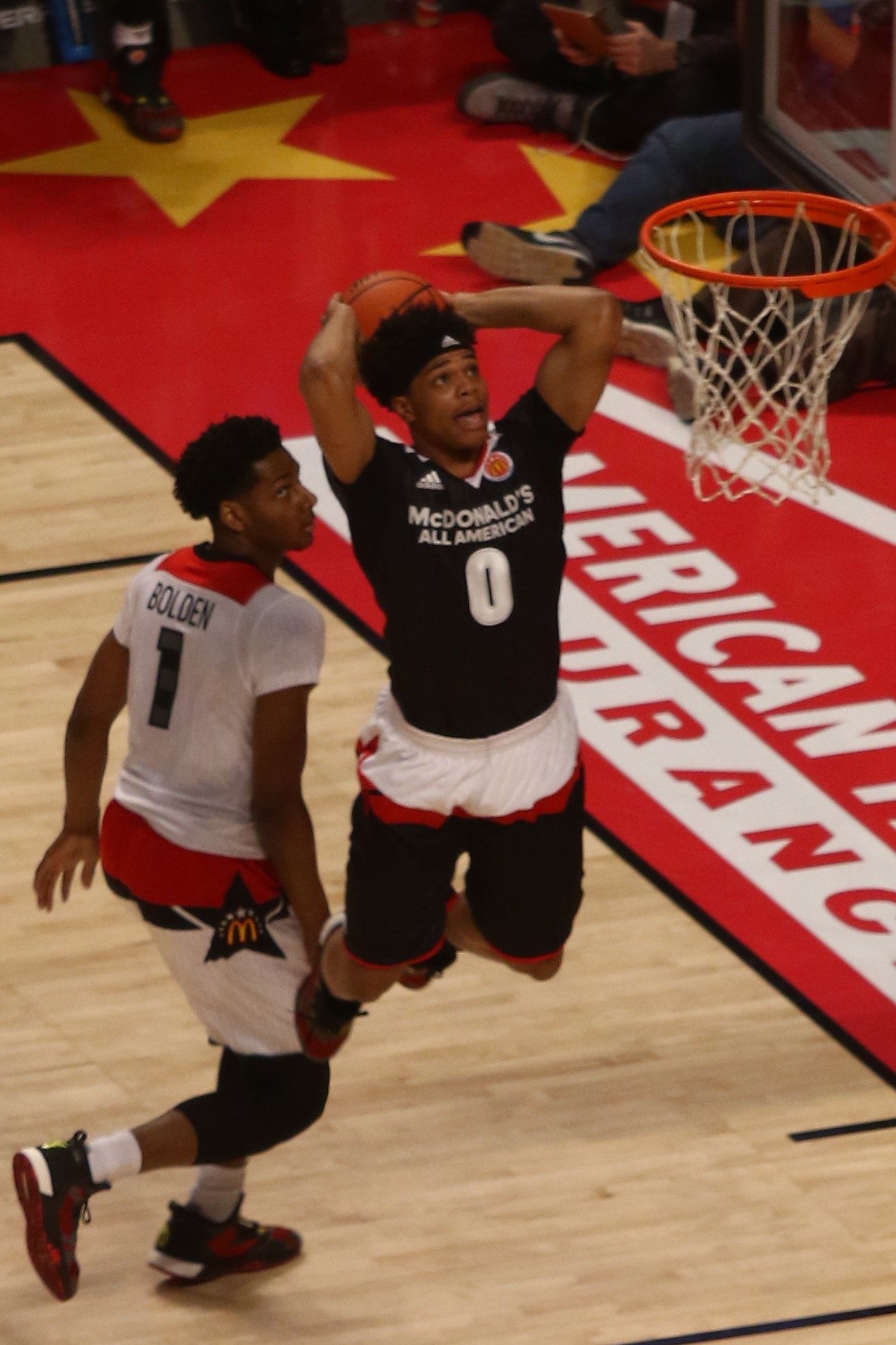
Miles Bridges

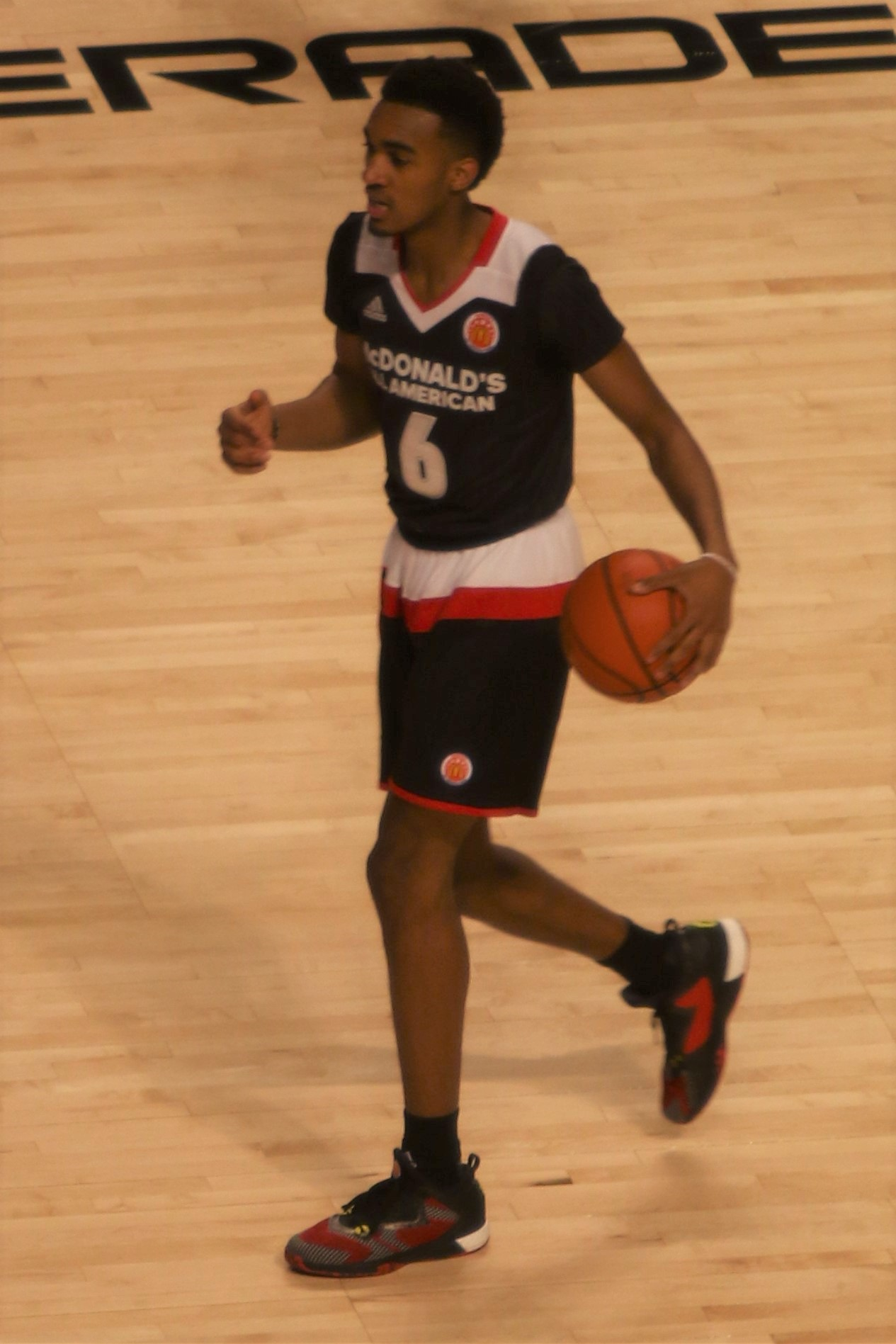
Terrance Ferguson

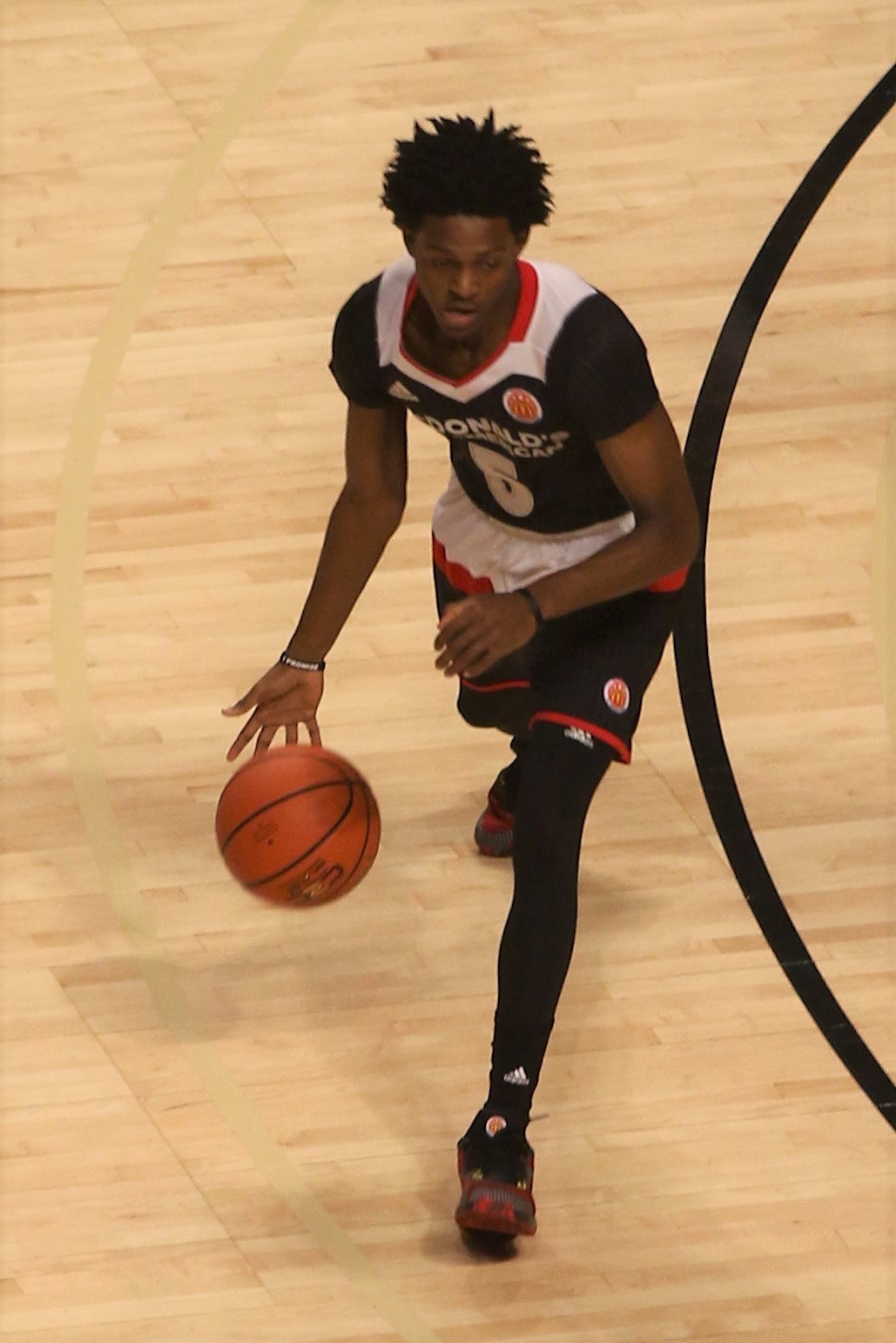
De'Aaron Fox

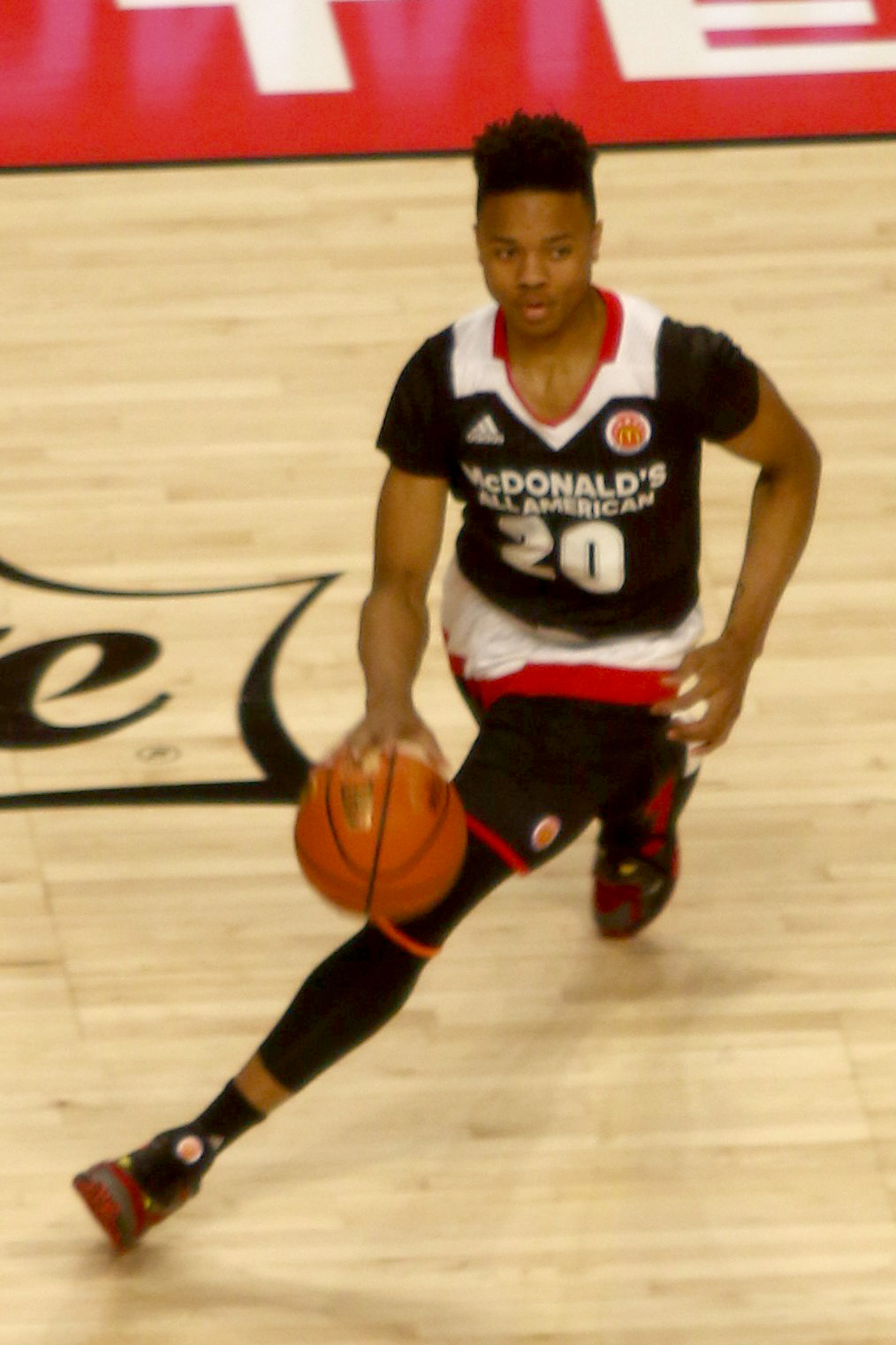
Markelle Fultz

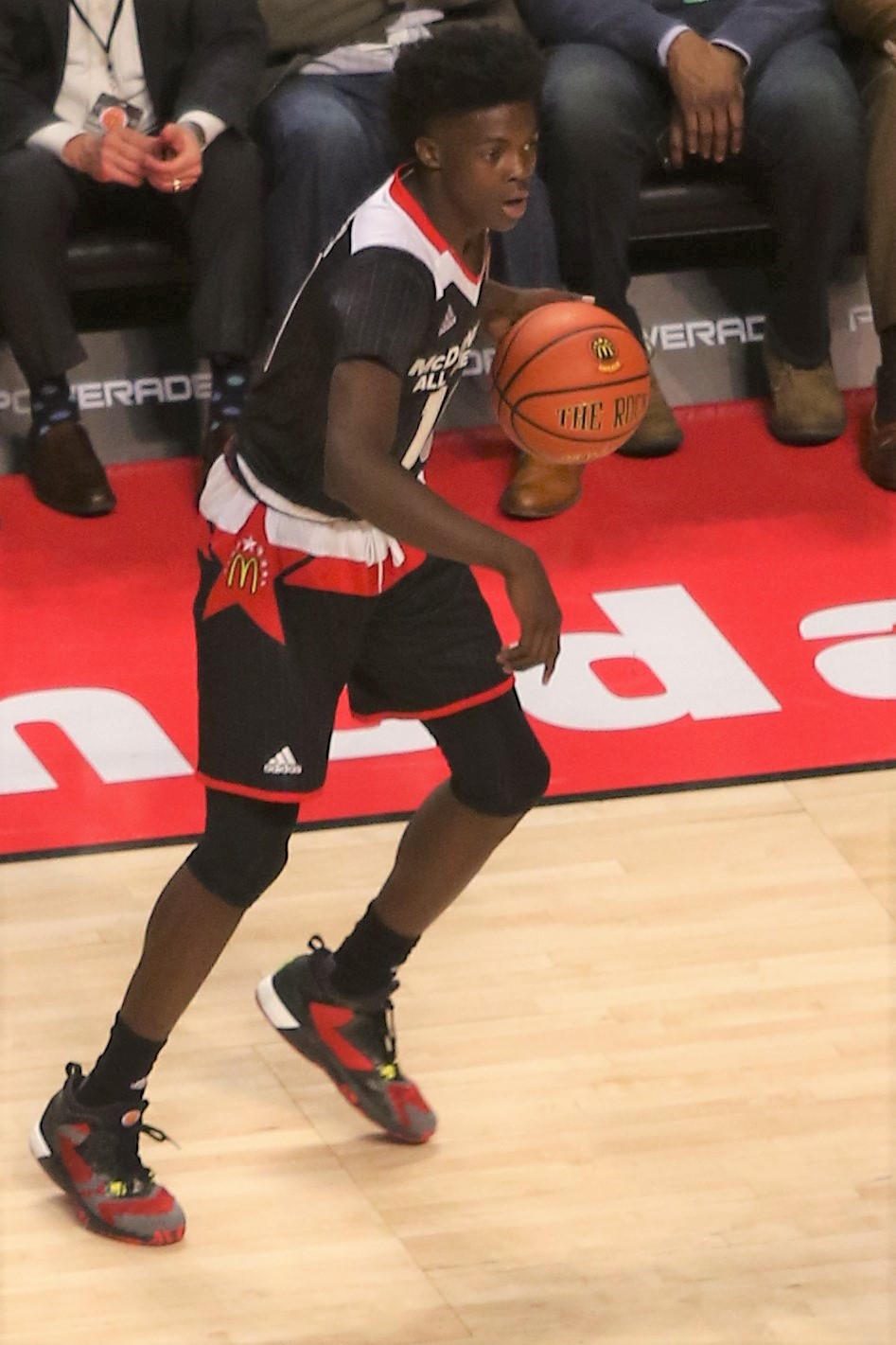
Andrew Jones

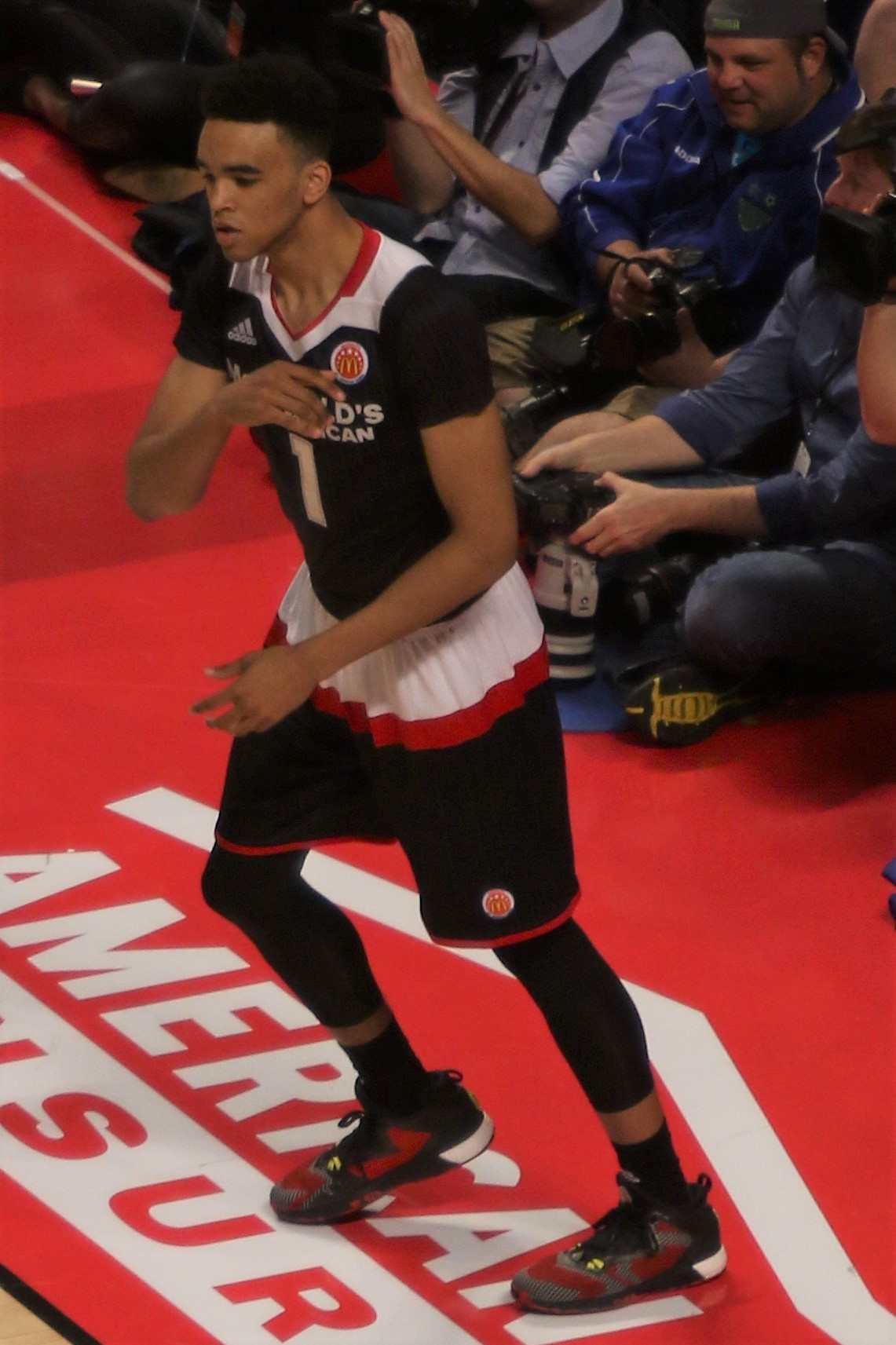
Sacha Killeya-Jones

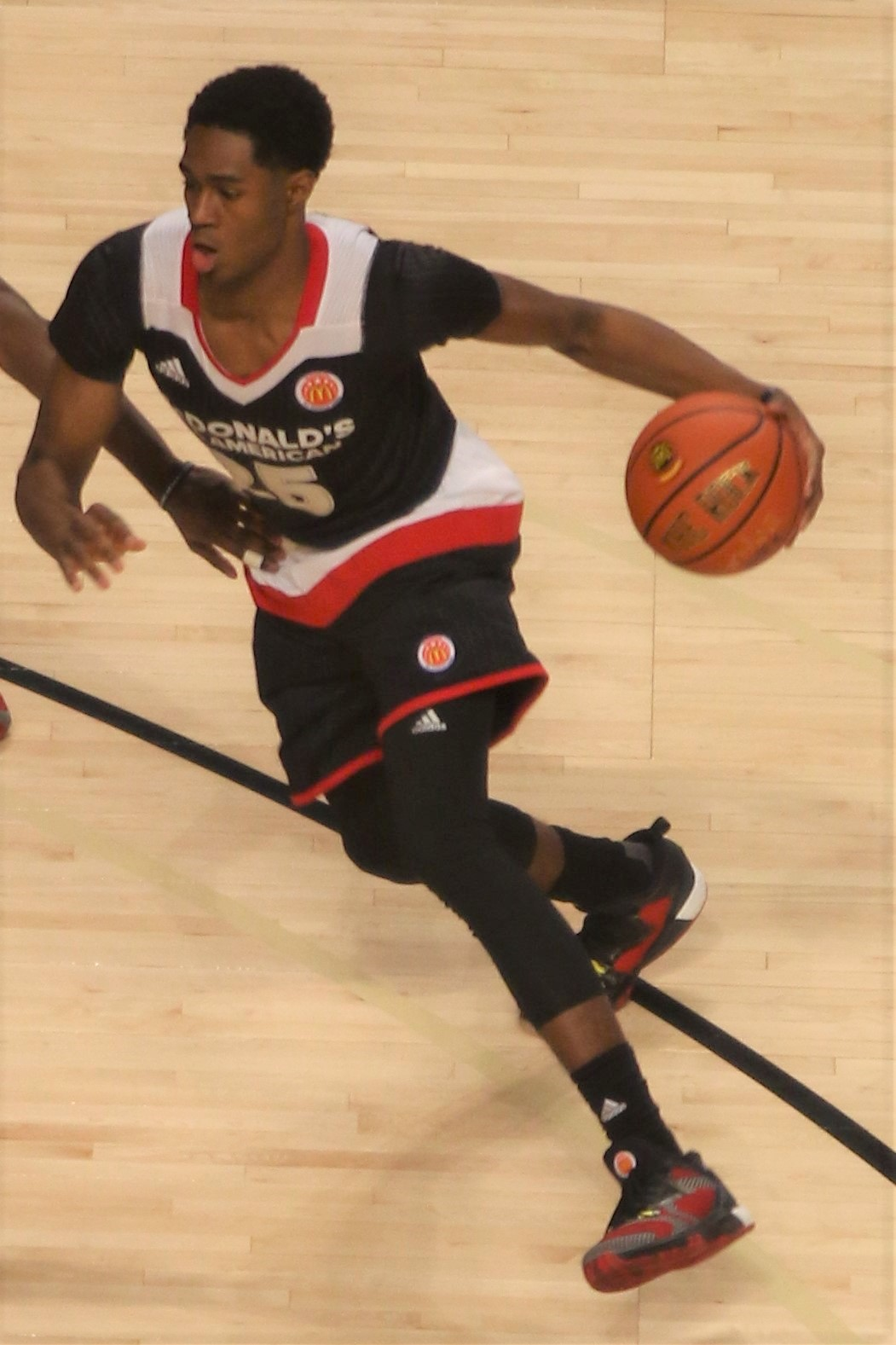
V. J. King

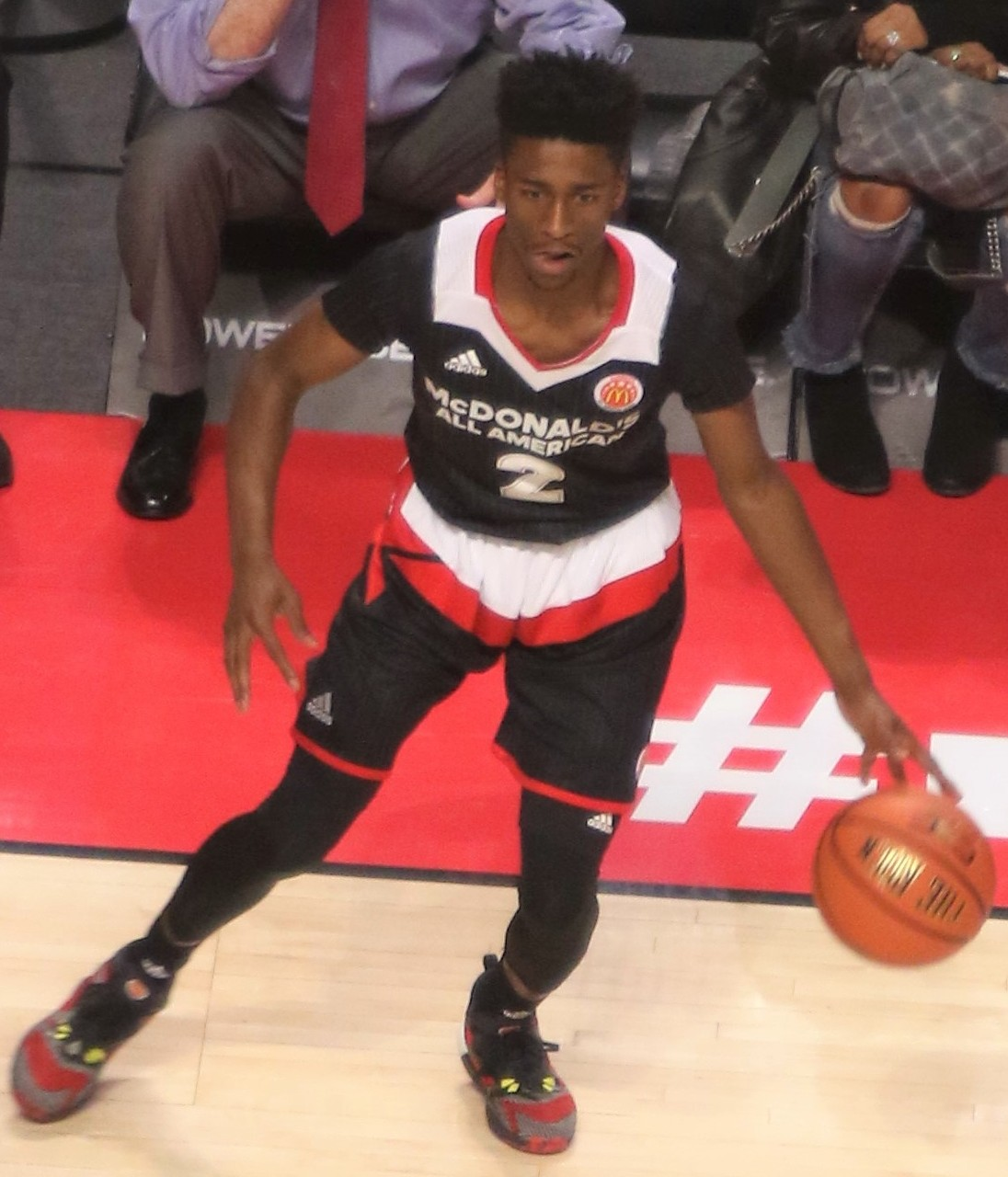
Kobi Simmons

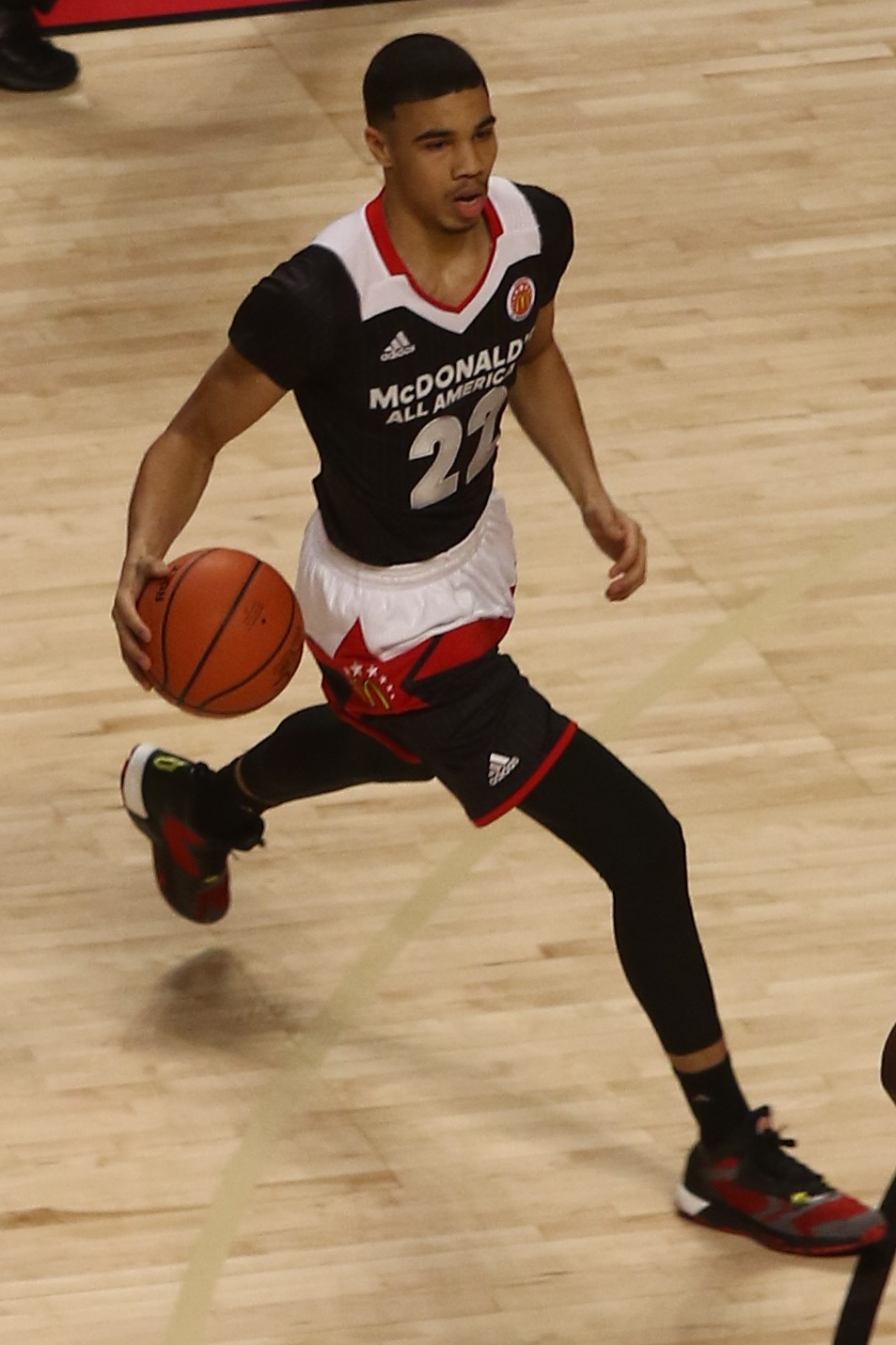
Jayson Tatum

The East team was coached by:

- Jack Doss (head coach) (J.O. Johnson High School, Huntsville, AL)

^Player was uncommitted when the team was announced.

== Box score ==
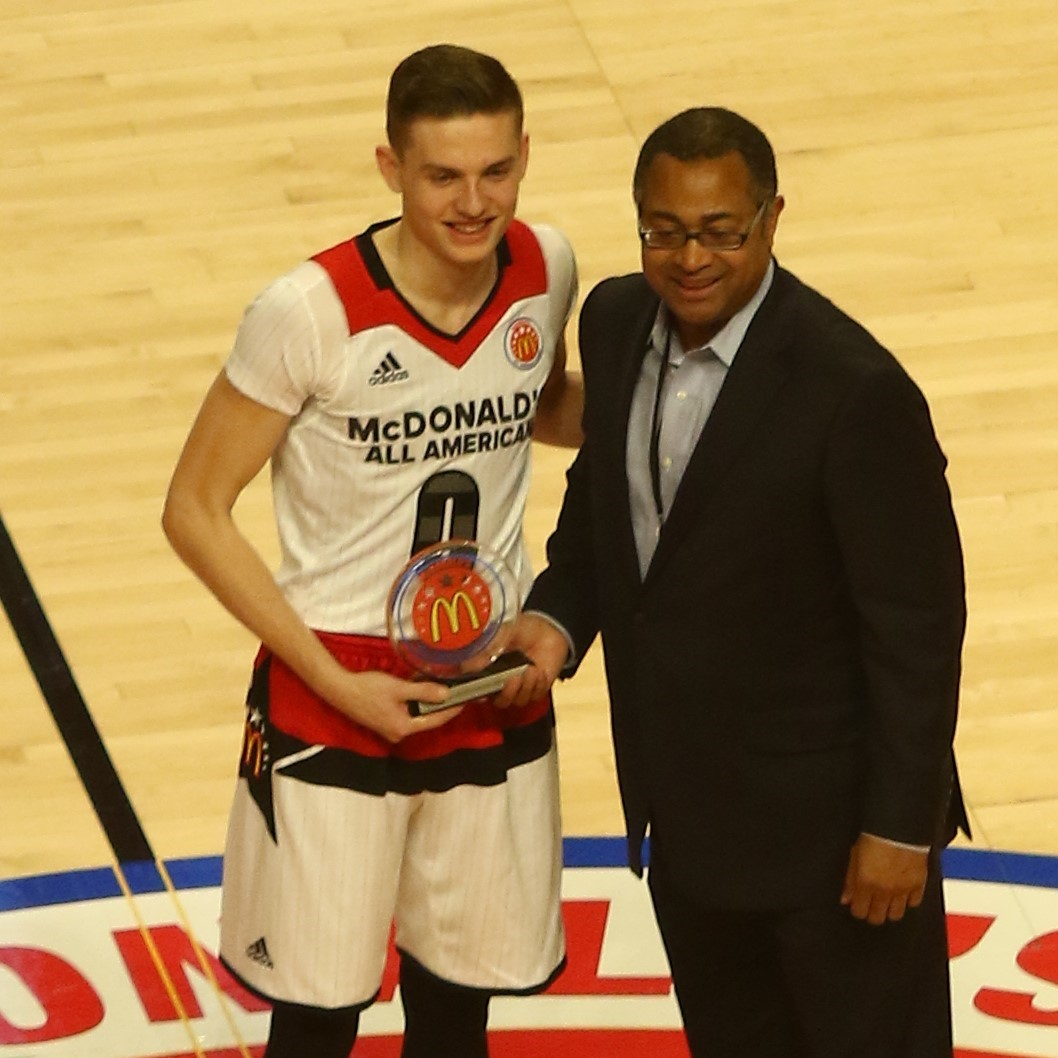
Kyle Guy won the Jack Daly sportsmanship award.

Josh Jackson and Frank Jackson led the West to a 114–107 victory with 19 points apiece.

ESPN

March 30, 2016
09:00 pm ET

East	107–114	West
Scoring by half: 47-52, 60-62
Pts: Tatum 18; Rebs: Adebayo 12; Asts: Fox 7		Pts: J. Jackson/F. Jackson 19; Rebs: Leaf 9 Asts: Ball 13

United Center, Chicago, IL
Referees: Troy Boardman, Jason Shook, Vernal Taylor

== Awards ==
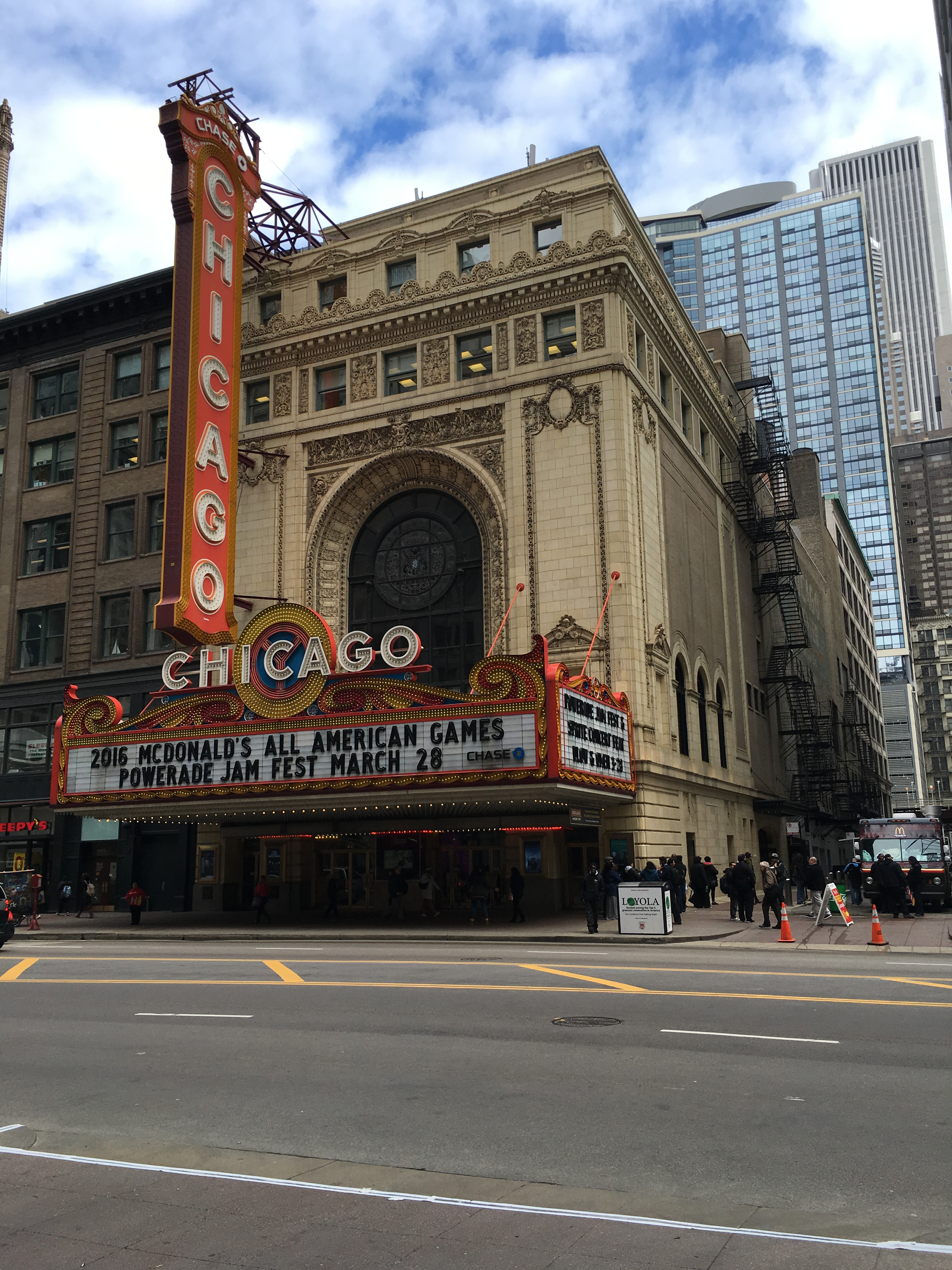
The Powerade Jam Fest was held at the Chicago Theatre on March 28.

During the Powerade Jam Fest held at the Chicago Theatre on March 28, Frank Jackson won the dunk contest, Malik Monk won the three-point contest and Jayson Tatum won the skills competition.

== See also ==
2016 McDonald's All-American Girls Game
