= Dewan Hernandez =

American basketball player (born 1996)

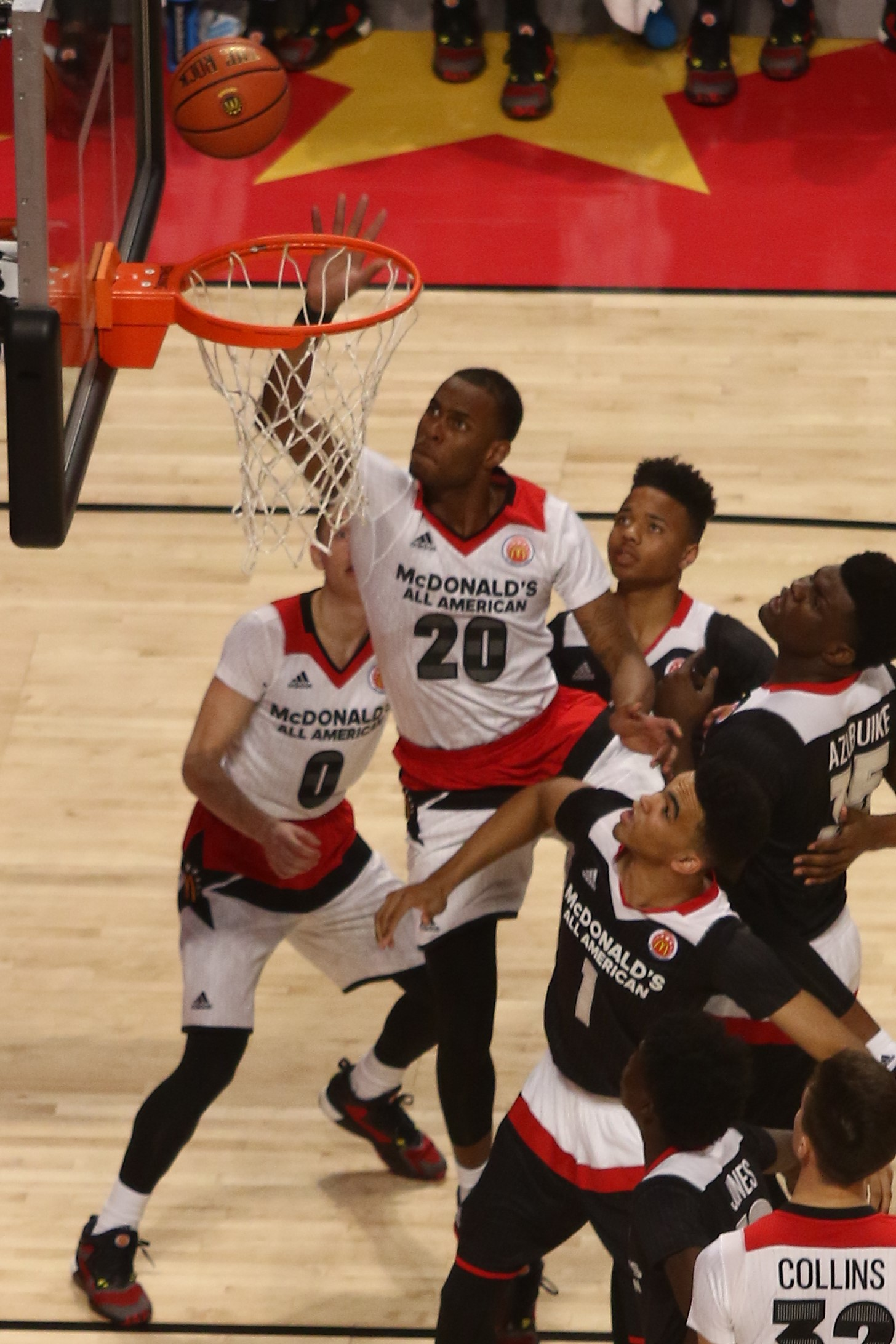
- Hernandez in the 2016 McDonald's All-American Game

No. 9 – Taoyuan Pauian Pilots
- Position: Center / power forward
- League: P. LEAGUE+

Personal information
- Born: December 9, 1996 (age 29) Miami, Florida, U.S.
- Listed height: 6 ft 10 in (2.08 m)
- Listed weight: 235 lb (107 kg)

Career information
- High school: Miami Norland (Miami Gardens, Florida)
- College: Miami (Florida) (2016–2018)
- NBA draft: 2019: 2nd round, 59th overall pick
- Drafted by: Toronto Raptors
- Playing career: 2019–present

Career history
- 2019–2020: Toronto Raptors
- 2019: →Raptors 905
- 2021: Raptors 905
- 2021: Rio Grande Valley Vipers
- 2021: Hapoel Tel Aviv
- 2022: Westchester Knicks
- 2022: Vaqueros de Bayamón
- 2022–2023: Wonju DB Promy
- 2023: Ningbo Rockets
- 2023: Cangrejeros de Santurce
- 2024–2025: Promitheas Patras
- 2025: Capitanes de Arecibo
- 2025–present: Busan KCC Egis

Career highlights
- McDonald's All-American (2016)
- Stats at NBA.com
- Stats at Basketball Reference

Dewan Antonio Hernandez (born Dewan Antonio Huell; December 9, 1996) is an American professional basketball player for Busan KCC Egis of the Korean Basketball League (KBL). He played college basketball for the Miami Hurricanes, and briefly played for the Toronto Raptors in the National Basketball Association (NBA).

== High school career ==
Hernandez attended Miami Norland High School in Miami, Florida, playing on three state championship teams. As a senior, he averaged 19.2 points and 9.1 rebounds per game and was the Miami Herald 8A-6A Player of the Year. In January 2016, Hernandez was named a McDonald's All American, and competed in the 2016 McDonald's All-American Game. In the Under Armour Association circuit, he participated with Team Breakdown and averaged 16.1 points and 8.6 rebounds per game. He committed to Miami after considering offers from Florida State and South Carolina. He was rated as a five-star recruit and was ranked 28th in the 2016 high school class by ESPN.

== College career ==
As a freshman, he averaged 5.8 points and 3.1 rebounds per game. He showed marked improvement as a sophomore and scored a career-high 23 points in a victory over Minnesota on November 29, 2017. Hernandez averaged 11.4 points and 6.6 rebounds per game as a sophomore while shooting 57 percent from the field. Following the season, he declared for the 2018 NBA draft but did not hire an agent and ultimately withdrew and returned to Miami.

In October 2018, he announced he had legally changed his name to Dewan Hernandez in honor of his mother, Christina Hernandez. Hernandez ultimately would not play for Miami in his junior season due to eligibility concerns relating to the 2017–18 NCAA Division I men's basketball corruption scandal revolving around Christian Dawkins. After failing to qualify for eligibility twice, Hernandez declared his entry for the 2019 NBA draft on January 28, 2019.

== Professional career ==
=== Toronto Raptors (2019–2020) ===
On June 20, 2019, Hernandez was drafted in the second round, 59th overall, in the 2019 NBA draft by the Toronto Raptors. On July 13, 2019, Hernandez was officially signed by the Toronto Raptors to an entry-level contract. On November 4, 2019, Hernandez received his first NBA G League assignment to the Raptors 905.

In his first NBA G league game, Hernandez recorded 24 points, 10 rebounds, 3 assists and 2 blocks in a 94–109 loss to the Grand Rapids Drive. On August 12, 2020, Hernandez scored an NBA-career high 6 points and 2 assists, including clutch shots to help the Raptors win their sixth game in the NBA Restart Season against the Philadelphia 76ers 125–121.

On November 26, 2020, Hernandez was waived by the Raptors. On December 19, he was signed and immediately waived by the Raptors for the purpose of joining their G-League team, Raptors 905, as an affiliate player.

=== Raptors 905 (2021) ===
On January 27, 2021, Hernandez was listed one of many players listed on the Raptors 905 announced roster.

=== Rio Grande Valley Vipers (2021) ===
On February 26, 2021, Hernandez was traded to the Rio Grande Valley Vipers in exchange for guard Jarron Cumberland.

=== Hapoel Tel Aviv (2021) ===
On September 19, 2021, Hernandez signed with Hapoel Tel Aviv B.C. of the Israeli Basketball Premier League. In seven games, he averaged 7.3 points and 4.3 rebounds per game. Hernandez left the team on December 8, 2021.

=== Westchester Knicks (2022) ===
On January 1, 2022, Hernandez was acquired by the Westchester Knicks via returning player rights.

=== Vaqueros de Bayamón (2022) ===
On April 11, 2022, Hernandez signed with the Vaqueros de Bayamón of the BSN.

=== Promitheas Patras (2024–2025) ===
On October 7, 2024, Hernandez returned to active status by signing with Greek club Promitheas.

=== Mets de Guaynabo (2025) ===
On April 23, 2025, Hernandez signed with the Mets de Guaynabo of the Baloncesto Superior Nacional.

== Personal life ==
Dewan is of Trinidadian and Honduran descent. He is the cousin of NFL running back Duke Johnson.

== Career statistics ==
Year	Team	League	GP	MPG	FG%	3P%	FT%	RPG	APG	SPG	BPG	PPG
2019–20	Toronto Raptors	NBA	6	4.7	.357	.500	.600	2.3	.5	.2	.0	2.3
2019–20	Raptors 905	NBA G League	9	29.3	.408	.160	.571	9.1	1.7	1.0	1.8	13.7
Career		All Leagues	13	21.2	.400	.154	.625	6.9	1.2	.8	1.2	9.8

=== College ===
Year	Team	GP	GS	MPG	FG%	3P%	FT%	RPG	APG	SPG	BPG	PPG
2016–17	Miami	32	15	17.4	.531	.000	.647	3.1	.2	.4	.8	5.8
2017–18	Miami	32	32	25.8	.576	.000	.689	6.7	.4	.5	1.0	11.4
Career		64	47	21.6	.560	.000	.675	4.9	.3	.5	.9	8.6
