= V. J. King =

American basketball player

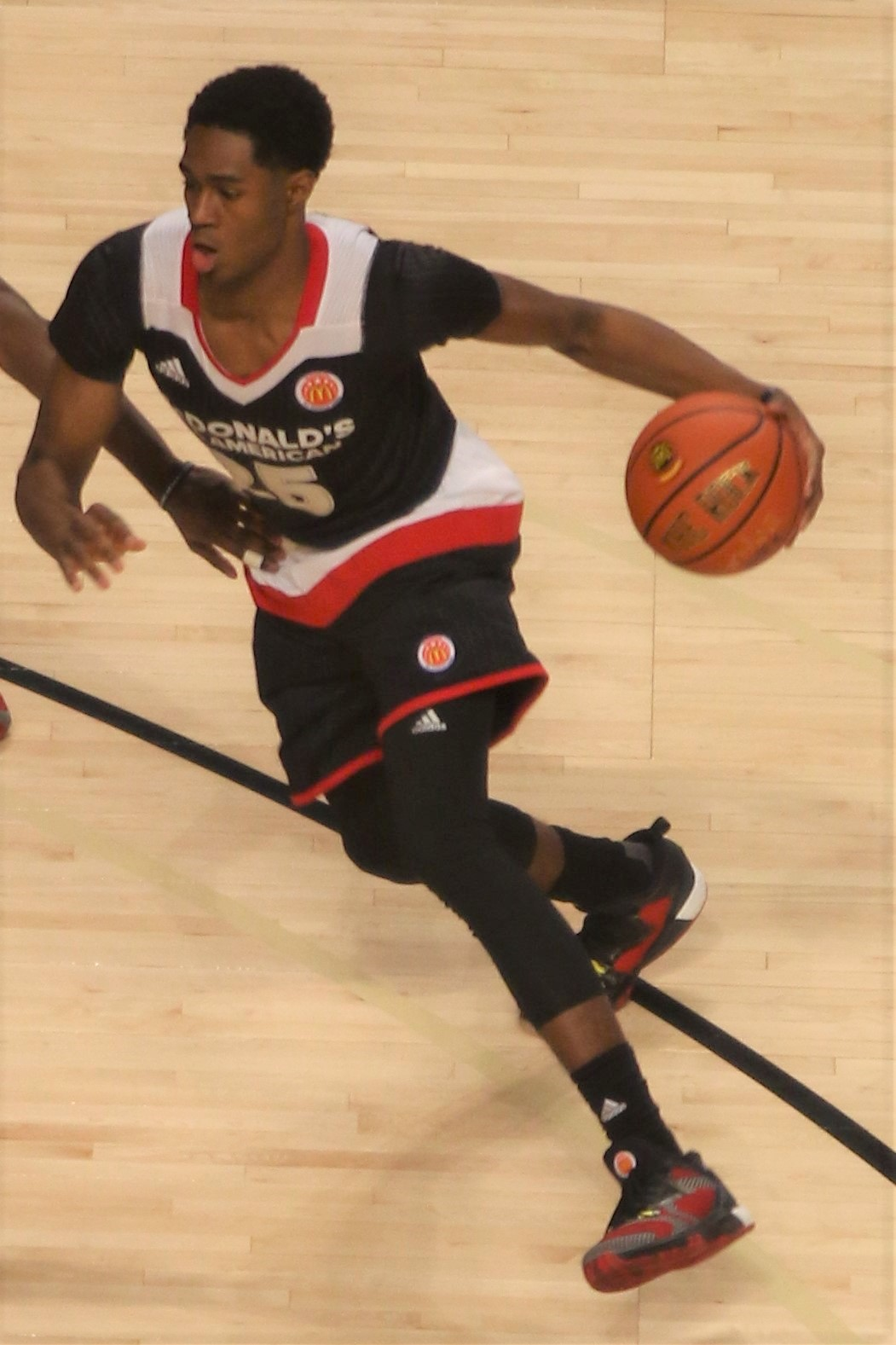
- King in the 2016 McDonald's All-American Boys Game

No. 13 – Maccabi Rishon LeZion
- Position: Shooting guard / small forward
- League: Israeli Basketball Premier League

Personal information
- Born: January 22, 1997 (age 29) Cleveland, Ohio, U.S.
- Listed height: 6 ft 6 in (1.98 m)
- Listed weight: 210 lb (95 kg)

Career information
- High school: St. Vincent–St. Mary (Akron, Ohio); Paul VI Catholic (Fairfax, Virginia)
- College: Louisville (2016–2019)
- NBA draft: 2019: undrafted
- Playing career: 2019–present

Career history
- 2019–2022: Westchester Knicks
- 2022–2023: Bristol Flyers
- 2023–2024: Hamburg Towers
- 2024–2025: Victoria Libertas Pesaro
- 2025–2026: Bursaspor
- 2026–present: Maccabi Rishon LeZion

Career highlights
- McDonald's All-American (2016)
- Stats at Basketball Reference
Medals
Men's basketball
Representing the United States
FIBA U17 World Cup
Gold medal – first place	2014 Dubai	National team
FIBA Americas U16 Championship
Gold medal – first place	2013 Uruguay	National team

Vincent Earl King Jr. (born January 22, 1997) is an American professional basketball player for Maccabi Rishon LeZion of the Israeli Basketball Premier League. He played college basketball for the Louisville Cardinals.

== Early life and high school career ==
King is the son of Lo and Vincent King Sr. When he was in sixth grade at the United Faith Christian Academy, he received his first Division I scholarship offer from Charlotte. Prior to his freshman year of high school, King moved to Akron, Ohio and he attended St. Vincent–St. Mary High School. He became the first freshman to start on the team since LeBron James and he led the Fighting Irish to the state final. As a sophomore, he averaged 17 points per game and was named to the 2013–14 Associated Press Division II All-Ohio First Team alongside teammate Jalen Hudson. King transferred to Paul VI Catholic High School in Fairfax, Virginia prior to his junior year where he was coached by Glenn Farello. He averaged 18.7 points per game as a junior and earned All-Met honors. On the AAU Circuit, King competed for Team Takeover where he averaged 14.2 points and 5.2 rebounds per game in 2015. King scored 35 points in a high school game in December 2015. As a senior, King averaged 22.9 points, 9.6 rebounds, 2.5 assists and 2.1 steals per game. He led the Panthers to a 20–11 record and to the Virginia Independent Schools Athletic Association Division I state championship game. He was a First Team All-Washington Catholic Athletic Conference honoree and was selected as the USA Today Gatorade Virginia Basketball Player of the Year. King was named a McDonald's All American in 2016 and was selected to the Jordan Brand Classic.

King was a five-star recruit ranked No. 27 in his class according to ESPN, while Rivals ranked him No. 11 in the class of 2016. On June 12, 2015, King committed to Louisville, spurning offers from Arizona, UConn and Virginia among others. He cited his relationship with Louisville assistant coach Kenny Johnson, previously an assistant at Paul VI, as crucial in his decision.

== College career ==
On February 6, 2017, King scored a career-high 24 points on 8-of-14 shooting in a loss against Virginia. As a freshman at Louisville, King averaged 5.5 points per game off the bench. He started every game as a sophomore and averaged 8.6 points and 3.3 rebounds per game, shooting 32 percent from three-point range. As a junior, he started five games and averaged 3.9 points and 3.0 rebounds per game. After the season, he announced he was leaving Louisville and entered the 2019 NBA draft.

== Professional career ==
After going undrafted in the 2019 NBA draft, King signed with the New York Knicks. He was waived by the Knicks on October 19, 2019. King joined their G League affiliate, the Westchester Knicks. King played in 13 of the team's first 15 games then missed roughly a month due to a strained hamstring and knee soreness. He returned to Westchester on January 18, 2020, and on January 31 posted his season high 17 points against the Maine Red Claws. King averaged 4.7 points and 2.3 rebounds in his rookie season.

He was waived on February 1, 2022.

On August 10, 2022, he signed with the Bristol Flyers of the British Basketball League. King averaged 18.2 points, 6.6 rebounds and 2 assists per game, earning BBL Team of the Year honors.

On June 30, 2023, he signed with Hamburg Towers of the Basketball Bundesliga.

On July 18, 2024, he signed with Victoria Libertas Pesaro of the Italian Lega Basket Serie A (LBA).

On July 30, 2025, he signed with Bursaspor Basketbol of the Basketbol Süper Ligi (BSL).

== National team career ==
King competed in the 2013 FIBA Under-16 World Championship representing the United States. He helped the team go 5–0, winning the title while averaging 8.2 points and 5.2 rebounds per game.

King competed in the 2014 FIBA Under-17 World Championship representing the United States. He helped the team go 7–0, winning the title while averaging 6.7 points and 2.9 rebounds per game.

== Career statistics ==
Legend
GP	Games played	GS	Games started	MPG	Minutes per game
FG%	Field goal percentage	3P%	3-point field goal percentage	FT%	Free throw percentage
RPG	Rebounds per game	APG	Assists per game	SPG	Steals per game
BPG	Blocks per game	PPG	Points per game	**Bold**	Career high

=== NBA G League ===
==== Regular season ====
Year	Team	GP	GS	MPG	FG%	3P%	FT%	RPG	APG	SPG	BPG	PPG
2019–20	Westchester	26	2	11.8	.398	.282	.769	2.4	.6	.2	.1	4.7
Career		26	2	11.8	.398	.282	.769	2.4	.6	.2	.1	4.7

=== College ===
Year	Team	GP	GS	MPG	FG%	3P%	FT%	RPG	APG	SPG	BPG	PPG
2016–17	Louisville	33	7	13.5	**.432**	**.421**	**.821**	2.1	.5	.2	**.1**	5.5
2017–18	Louisville	**36**	**36**	**25.4**	.398	.320	.735	**3.3**	**.9**	**.6**	**.1**	**8.6**
2018–19	Louisville	32	5	13.7	.367	.114	.791	3.0	.6	.2	**.1**	3.9
Career		101	48	17.8	.400	.297	.772	2.8	.7	.3	.1	6.1
