= Sacha Killeya-Jones =

American-British basketball player (born 1998)

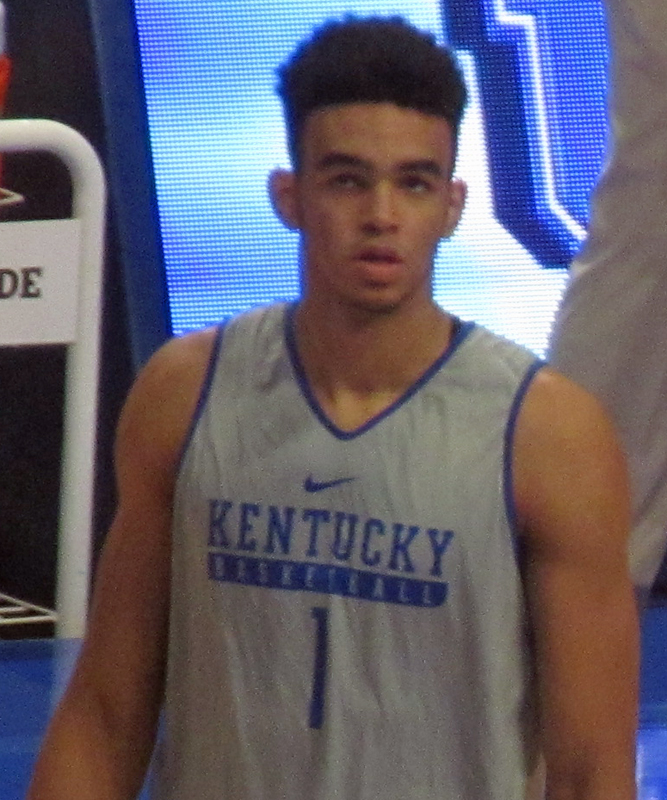
- Killeya-Jones with Kentucky in 2016

No. 8 – Shandong Hi-Speed Kirin
- Position: Power forward / center
- League: CBA

Personal information
- Born: August 10, 1998 (age 28) Highland Park, New Jersey, U.S.
- Listed height: 6 ft 11 in (2.11 m)
- Listed weight: 220 lb (100 kg)

Career information
- High school: Woodberry Forest (Woodberry Forest, Virginia); Virginia Episcopal (Lynchburg, Virginia)
- College: Kentucky (2016–2018)
- NBA draft: 2019: undrafted
- Playing career: 2019–present

Career history
- 2019: Sparta Praha
- 2019–2020: BC Kalev
- 2020–2021: MKS Dąbrowa Górnicza
- 2021–2022: Hapoel Gilboa Galil
- 2022–2023: Oklahoma City Blue
- 2023–2024: Surne Bilbao Basket
- 2024–2025: Kawasaki Brave Thunders
- 2026–present: Shandong Hi-Speed Kirin

Career highlights
- Israeli League Top Scorer (2022); B.League Blocks Leader (2025); McDonald's All-American (2016)
- Stats at NBA.com
- Stats at Basketball Reference

Sacha Liam Killeya-Jones (born August 10, 1998) is an American-British professional basketball player for Shandong Hi-Speed Kirin of the Chinese Basketball Association (CBA). He played college basketball for Kentucky.

== High school career ==
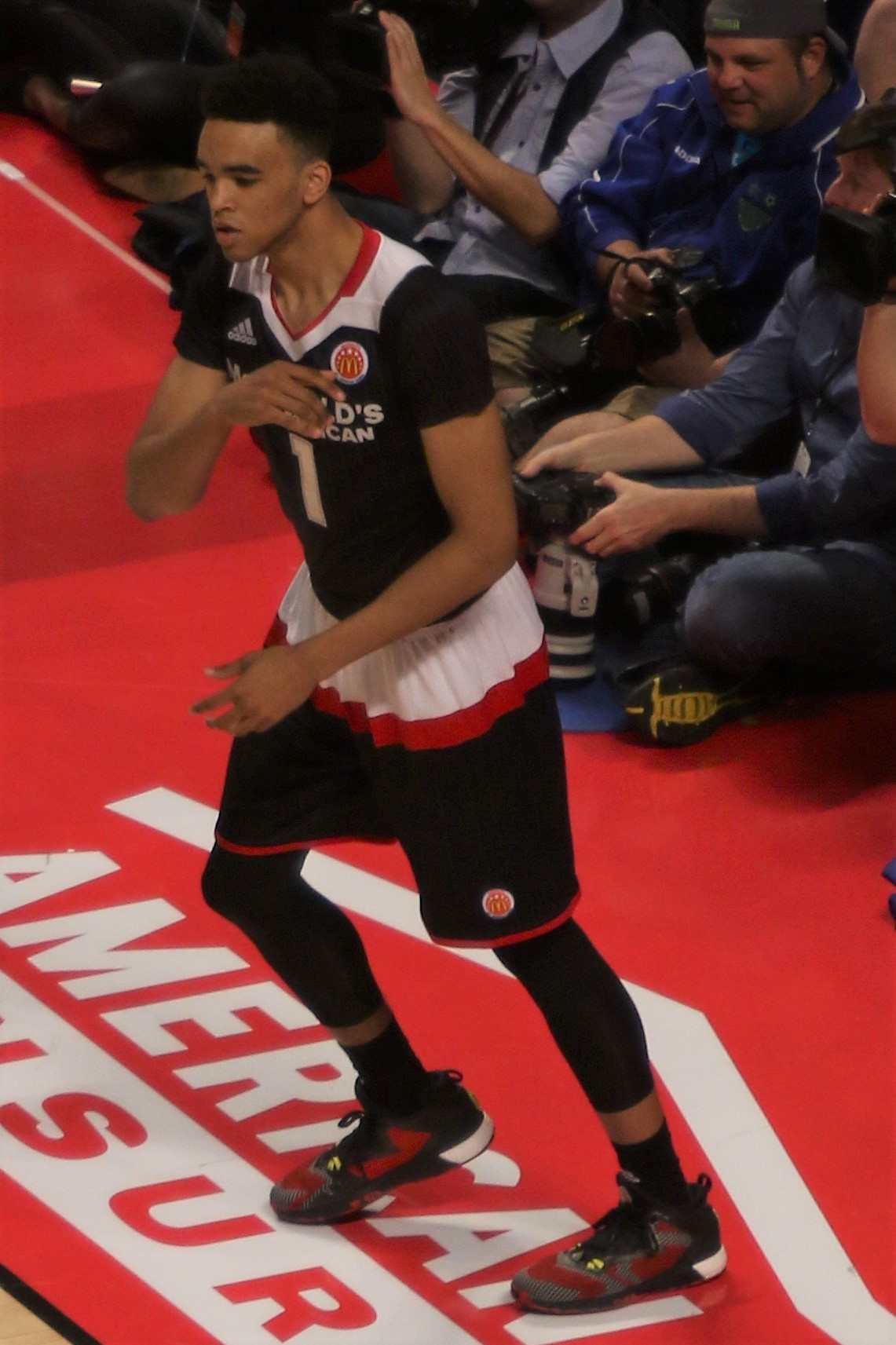
Killeya-Jones at the 2016 McDonald's All-American Game

Killeya-Jones grew up playing football at the quarterback position. As a freshman at Woodberry Forest School in Woodberry Forest, Virginia, he played football, a year before giving up the sport in exchange for basketball, which better suited his height and build. For his final two years, Killeya-Jones transferred to Virginia Episcopal School in Lynchburg, Virginia. In his senior season, he averaged 23.6 points, 10 rebounds and three blocks per game and led his team to a VISAA Division II state title. He was also selected to play in the 2016 McDonald's All-American Game. Killeya-Jones left high school as a consensus five-star recruit. He originally committed to Virginia before switching to Kentucky.

== College career ==
As a freshman at Kentucky, Killeya-Jones played 14 games, averaging 2.9 points and 2.2 rebounds in 6.9 minutes per game. He did not play for much of the second half of the season, logging minutes in 14 total games. In his sophomore season, he became a more frequent contributor off the bench, averaging 3.3 points and 2.9 rebounds in 13.7 minutes per game through 34 appearances. After the season, Killeya-Jones announced that he was transferring from Kentucky. On May 15, 2018, he committed to continue his career at NC State and sit out his next season due to National Collegiate Athletic Association (NCAA) transfer rules. On February 28, 2019, before becoming eligible to play, Killeya-Jones left NC State to pursue a professional career.

== Professional career ==
=== 2019–22 ===
In April 2019, Killeya-Jones joined Get Better Academy, a private basketball academy based in Prague. He played 12 games for the academy team Sparta Praha of the 1.Liga, the second-tier Czech basketball league, and averaged 18.7 points and 8.3 rebounds per game. On July 11, Killeya-Jones signed with Braunschweig of the Basketball Bundesliga, the top-tier German league, but never played an official game with the team due to injury. For the 2019–20 season, he signed with Kalev/Cramo, an Estonian team competing in the Latvian-Estonian Basketball League and VTB United League. He averaged 10.3 points and 4.0 rebounds per game for the club.

On July 13, 2020, Killeya-Jones signed with MKS Dąbrowa Górnicza of the Polish Basketball League. He averaged 19 points, 8.9 rebounds, 2 assists and 2 blocks per game, but left the team in January 2021 after suffering a torn Patellar Tendon.

On August 23, 2021, Killeya-Jones signed with Hapoel Gilboa Galil of the Israeli Basketball Premier League. In 2021–22, he led the league in scoring, averaging 18.4 points per game.

=== Oklahoma City Blue (2022–2023) ===
On October 2, 2022, Killeya-Jones signed with the Oklahoma City Thunder as Sterling Brown was waived. In his first preseason game with the Thunder, he recorded one block against Vlatko Čančar. After just one preseason game, he was waived on October 4. On November 3, he was named to the opening night roster for the Oklahoma City Blue.

=== Surne Bilbao Basket (2023–present) ===
On June 30, 2023, Killeya-Jones signed with Surne Bilbao Basket of the Liga ACB.

== National team career ==
Killeya-Jones, who has a British-born mother, is a dual citizen of the United States and the United Kingdom. He represents Great Britain at the international level. Killeya-Jones attended the team's training camp for FIBA EuroBasket 2017. He earned his first international cap against Ukraine in the Patras Tournament on 7 August 2017, but did not play, he was only 18-years-old. A few days later, Killeya-Jones saw action for the first time and scored 9 points vs Israel in a closed international test match. He played for Great Britain at FIBA EuroBasket 2022 qualifiers.
