= Shot Callin =

2025 promotional single by YoungBoy Never Broke Again

Promotional single by YoungBoy Never Broke Again

from the album MASA
- Released: May 2, 2025
- Length: 3:45
- Label: Never Broke Again; Motown
- Songwriters: Kentrell Gaulden; Jason Goldberg; Kyle Green; Antonio Ramos
- Producers: Cheese; Tayo; TrillGotJuice

Music video
- "Shot Callin" on YouTube

"Shot Callin" is a song by American rapper YoungBoy Never Broke Again, released on May 2, 2025, as a promotional single from his album MASA (2025). It was produced by Cheese, Tayo, and TrillGotJuice. The song was released alongside "Where I Been" as Gaulden's first release since his 2025 prison release.

== Composition ==
A 3:45-long song, the track features a sample of "Tweaker", written by LiAngelo Ball, Stanislav Kunash, and Andrei Rodionov, as performed by Gelo.

== Music video ==
An accompanying Nick Belotti-directed music video was released on May 2, 2025. It features Gaulden showing off his cars and jewelry while in Utah. Several scenes are shot in gas stations and garages.

== Critical reception ==
HotNewHipHop ranked the song as the 9th best rap song of 2025.

== Personnel ==
Credits adapted from Tidal.

- YoungBoy Never Broke Again – vocals, engineering
- Jason "Cheese" Goldberg – mastering, mixing

== Charts ==
=== Weekly charts ===
Weekly chart performance for "Shot Callin"
| Chart (2025–2026) | Peak position |
|---|---|
| US Billboard Hot 100 | 43 |
| US Hot R&B/Hip-Hop Songs (Billboard) | 7 |
| US Rhythmic Airplay (Billboard) | 34 |

=== Year-end charts ===
Year-end chart performance for "Shot Callin"
| Chart (2025) | Position |
|---|---|
| US Hot R&B/Hip-Hop Songs (Billboard) | 93 |

== Certifications ==
| Region | Certification | Certified units/sales |
|---|---|---|
| United States (RIAA) | Platinum | 1,000,000^{‡} |
^{‡} Sales+streaming figures based on certification alone.
