= DeShawn (mixtape) =

Mixtape by YoungBoy Never Broke Again
- Released: August 12, 2025
- Length: 36:33
- Label: Never Broke Again; Motown
- Compiler: DJ Khaled

YoungBoy Never Broke Again chronology
MASA (2025)	DeShawn (2025)

DeShawn is the twenty-second solo mixtape by American rapper YoungBoy Never Broke Again. It was released by Never Broke Again and Motown on August 12, 2025. Hosted by DJ Khaled, it features a sole guest appearance from fellow American rapper Kevin Gates on the song "Trap Out".

== Background ==
DJ Khaled announced DeShawn on Instagram on August 10, 2025, writing: "NEW MIXTAPE ALERT 🚨 #DESHAWN THIS TUESDAY! @nba_youngboy hosted by DJ KHALED! This a mixtape...but to me it sound like an album! Bless up!"

== Reception ==
Mackenzie Cummings-Grady of Billboard thought "Trap Out" is DeShawn's best track, writing: "It's easily the mixtape's most digestible track, standing out for its refreshing variety amidst the high-energy intensity that defines DESHAWN's other songs". In the same review, she ranked "Raq Shit" the lowest, stating it "feels more like a warm-up freestyle than an actual song". Commercially, the mixtape debuted at number 135 on the US Billboard 200, with 11,000 copies sold in its first week. It later peaked at number 96, and peaked at number 27 on Top R&B/Hip-Hop Albums.

== Track listing ==
Track listing
No.	Title	Length
1.	"AI Marley"	3:46
2.	"Free Vea"	2:36
3.	"By the Gate"	2:28
4.	"Trap Out" (featuring Kevin Gates)	3:08
5.	"Ms. Gaulden"	2:36
6.	"My'ya"	2:35
7.	"Pants Down"	2:32
8.	"Blazers"	2:32
9.	"Lord Forgive Me"	2:02
10.	"La Vida Loca"	2:48
11.	"Hustler"	2:57
12.	"Raq Shit"	3:24
13.	"This Month Confessions"	3:09
Total length:		36:33

== Charts ==
Chart performance
Chart (2025)	Peak position
US Billboard 200	96
US Top R&B/Hip-Hop Albums (Billboard)	27
