= MASA (album) =

Studio album by YoungBoy Never Broke Again
- Released: July 25, 2025
- Recorded: March – July 2025
- Genre: Hip-hop
- Length: 93:46
- Labels: Never Broke Again; Motown
- Producers: 17OnDaTrack; 5ree; Afterhxrs; Alex Cheyz; AyeReek; Aye Shark!; Ayo E Go Krazy; Bans; BboyBeatz; BGF_Wave; Bino Beats; B. March; BMPS Beatz; Cheese; Colorado; CuBeatz; CubSkout; Decastro; Don Mills; D-Roc; Dylan Hyde; EasterPink; Fasbeats; Garibeats; Gateway; G. Ry; Gucceo; Haisofn; Henry8; Horridrunitup; Ike Made; India Got Them Beats; ISM; Jahniya C; JB Sauced Up; Jordjii; Juppybeats; K10Beatz; Kaigoinkrazy; Kayn; KayoTheWizard; KC Da Beatmonster; Kenoe; Klimperboy; Ktoe; LondnBlue; MalikOTB; Mally Mall; MarsGawd; Mason Sacks; Menace; Moneyxo; Nessuno; O Soma; Red Jon; Sam Barsh; Sean Da Firzt; SeasonGoCrazy; Simo Fre; Skeeo!; SlickMadeThat; Sword; Tayo; Tip Beats; TnTXD; TrillGotJuice; VenoTheBuilder; Yooka beats

YoungBoy Never Broke Again chronology
More Leaks (2025)	MASA (2025)	Deshawn (2025)

Singles from MASA
- 1. "Top Tingz" Released: May 23, 2025

MASA (backronym as Make America Slime Again) is the eighth studio album by American rapper YoungBoy Never Broke Again. It was released through Never Broke Again and Motown on July 25, 2025. It features guest appearances from Playboi Carti and Mellow Rackz, while its production was handled by Gaulden's go-to engineer and producer Cheese, alongside MarsGawd, LondnBlue, Mally Mall, Simo Fre, and TnTXD, with several other producers. The album serves as a follow-up to Gaulden's seventh studio album, I Just Got a Lot on My Shoulders (2024), and his third compilation album, More Leaks (2025). The album was supported by its single, "Top Tingz". The album debuted on number six on the US Billboard 200, selling 49,000 equivalent album units in its first week, including 1,000 pure sales. The album's name has a similar name to the prominent American political slogan, "Make America Great Again".

== Release and promotion ==
After years of being under house arrest, Gaulden was officially released on probation in April 2025. Upon his release on May 3, Gaulden's associate, Kyle "Montana" Claiborne revealed that he was working on an album and a tour. On May 15, Gaulden and his label, Never Broke Again, announced the tour of the same name and its dates in a promotional trailer, revealing that tickets would be up for sale on May 20. Following high demand, additional dates were added to the tour multiple times.

On May 29, 2025, Gaulden was granted a presidential pardon by Donald Trump, permitting him to not have to submit to his previous probation restrictions. Days later, on June 2, Gaulden and his team took to Instagram to announce an additional 13 dates due to high demand. On June 16, Gaulden took to his Instagram to announce that the album would be released on July 4, 2025. In late June, Gaulden was seen with his crew in New York City filming a music video, which would be revealed as "Diesel", the album's twenty-sixth cut. On June 24, Gaulden's wife, Jazyln Mychelle shared a vlog of the two and their kids on vacation in Jamaica; this led to many Jamaican producers claiming involvement in Gaulden's, at-the-time, upcoming album. On July 2, Gaulden shared the album's official artwork with its release planned for July 4. Upon its announcement, Playboi Carti shared a picture of the two from an unreleased music video on his alternative Instagram. This was soon followed by Young Thug taking to his Instagram story to ask Gaulden to call him, hinting at a potential collaboration between the two rappers. Upon the album's original release of July 4, several tracks from the album were leaked, resulting in the record being released as a 10-track sampler with the album being pushed back to July 25. Days prior to the release of the album, billboards begun to appear across New York City to promote the record.

=== Singles ===
On May 3, upon Gaulden's release from prison, he released the album's first two promotional singles, "Where I Been" and "Shot Callin". On May 21, Gaulden appeared as a guest appearance on both Kanye West and Playboi Carti's version of "Alive". On May 22, Gaulden released the album's second promotional single, "Finest", accompanied by its music video. This was soon followed by the release of the album's lead single, "Top Tingz" on May 23. On July 1, Gaulden released the music videos for "Diesel" and "Over", the former appearing on the album's tracklist. On July 12, Gaulden released the official, Rich Porter-directed music video for "Kickboxer". On July 19, Gaulden released a music video for "So Not Sorry / Out the Window" exclusively on his YouTube channel before taking to his Instagram to confirm that the rest of the songs on the album would all be unheard. Hours after the song's release, Gaulden appeared alongside rapper Mellow Rackz on the track, "Guys Just Wanna Have Fun", a remix of "Girls Just Want to Have Fun" by Cyndi Lauper, released exclusively to Rackz's YouTube channel.

== Artwork ==
The official artwork for MASA sees Gaulden "showing his love of the USA". The cover is described as "bright and colorful" by HotNewHipHop's Zachary Horvath and features the rapper standing in front of the Flag of the United States with a green balaclava, representing the "Slime" in the album's name. HotNewHipHop's Bryson "Boom" Paul also described the cover as "bold" and wrote that it "[symbolizes] defiance and patriotism". The United States flag in the background can also be linked to Gaulden's presidential pardon, and the name of the album being in reference to Donald Trump's Make America Great Again slogan, with the album also aiming for an original July 4 release—the United States' day of independence.

== Controversy ==
On July 7, 2025, following the release of the MASA sampler, Florida rapper Kodak Black took to his Instagram to share his thoughts on the project, stating that he does not like it: "I just heard little bruh album it's straight trash, I don't even like that [...] and I like YoungBoy music but that shit ass tho". Kodak suggested that Gaulden was releasing MASA to get his attention and further indicated that there is behind-the-scenes issues between the two rappers, stemming from Gaulden's relationships with two of Kodak's ex-girlfriends. Following Kodak's post, Doodie Lo, an artist signed to Lil Durk—who Gaulden has an on-and-off feud with—commented in support of Kodak before an affiliate of Gaulden, ChaseDatBag B responded to the comment suggesting that Doodie Lo was unnecessarily attention seeking.

== Critical reception ==
Professional ratings
Review scores
Source	Rating
AllMusic	2.5/5 stars
Pitchfork	6.4/10

Upon the release of the album's sampler, HotNewHipHop's Bryson "Boom" Paul wrote that the album is "a celebration of freedom" and that it "represents resilience, growth, and the rapper's determination to reclaim his narrative". He continued that Gaulden "transforms personal trials into anthems of survival" and that he "[solidifies] his place in hip-hop's evolving landscape". He concluded that on the project, Gaulden "ruthless aggression that fans have come to adore" and that he is in "full throttle from beginning to end as he reclaims his star power".

TiVo Staff for AllMusic wrote that the record "is celebratory and at times overwhelmingly excited, yet also exposes his vulnerable side, touching on usual topics like anxiety and heartbreak". Pitchfork magazine's Matthew Ritchie described MASA as "a hyper-emotive data dump that churns through hunger, bitterness, boasts, and torment at breakneck speeds".

=== Year-end rankings ===
Year-end rankings for MASA
Publication	Accolade	Rank	Ref.
Complex	The 50 Best Albums of 2025	6	

== Commercial performance ==
MASA debuted at number six on the US Billboard 200 chart, earning 49,000 album-equivalent units in its first week, including 1,000 pure album sales. The album also accumulated a total of 69.15 million on-demand streams of the album's songs. MASA marks Gaulden's 16th top ten album on the Billboard 200, tying him with Jay-Z and Nas for the third most top ten albums, behind Drake at 17, and Future at 18. The album also marks Gaulden's 34th entry on the chart, surpassing E-40 for the most career entries on the chart among rappers.

== Track listing ==
MASA track listing
No.	Title	Writer(s)	Producer(s)	Length
1.	"My Shit"	Kentrell Gaulden; Henry Bingham	Henry 8; Redjon; Yookabeats	2:28
2.	"Games of War"	Gaulden; Jason Goldberg; Milos Angelov; Maurice Jordan; Seth Love	Cheese; Don Mills; Kenoe; Skeeo!	4:23
3.	"XXX"	Gaulden; Goldberg	Cheese; Mason Sacks; Tayo	3:05
4.	"Get Up with Us"	Gaulden; Goldberg; Simone Di Franco	Cheese; Simo Fre; Nessuno; MarsGawd	2:34
5.	"Fire Your Manager" (with Playboi Carti)	Gaulden; Jordan Carter	Ayeshark; Gateway; KC Da Beatmonster	3:53
6.	"Big"	Gaulden; Goldberg	Cheese; Cubskout; Easter Pink; VenoTheBuilder	2:32
7.	"I'm Ready"	Gaulden; Goldberg	Cheese; G. Ry; Ike; Bmarch	2:47
8.	"Morocco"	Gaulden; Goldberg; Jordan; Josh Joseph	Cheese; Kenoe; MarsGawd	2:47
9.	"Cold World" (with Mellow Rackz)	Gaulden; Bingham; Thomas Horton	Henry 8; Kaigoinkrazy; Fasbeats; TnTXD	3:36
10.	"No Fuck"	Gaulden; Goldberg	Cheese; Bans; Malik	3:20
11.	"Burn"	Gaulden; Goldberg; Jeremy Bradley Jr.	Cheese; JB Sauced Up	3:05
12.	"Alter"	Gaulden; Jordan; BGFwave; YzSword; Prod5ree	BGFwave; Colorado; YzSword; Prod5ree	2:50
13.	"Slimretta"	Gaulden; Goldberg; Jamal Rashid; Ishmael Montague	Cheese; Mally Mall; ISM; Tip Beats; Ayo E Go Crazy	2:17
14.	"Myself Pt. 2"	Gaulden; Bingham	Henry 8; Seasongocrazy	2:39
15.	"Cash Shit"	Gaulden; Rashid	Mally Mall; Ktoe	2:20
16.	"Combat Boots"	Gaulden; Goldberg; Daniel Leburn; Gabriel Decastro	Cheese; Drock; Menance; Nessuno; After Hours; Decastro	2:33
17.	"Wine & Dine"	Gaulden; Goldberg	Cheese; India Got Them Beats; Jahneyac; Alexcheyz; Guppy	2:01
18.	"Fuck the Drugs"	Gaulden; Bingham; Caesar Lindquist	Henry 8; Haisofn; MoneyXO; Prodbykiz	3:56
19.	"Lo"	Gaulden; Goldberg; Rashid; Montague	Cheese; Mally Mall; ISM; Tip Beats; Ayo E Go Crazy	2:59
20.	"If You Need Me"	Gaulden; Goldberg; Antonio Ramos	Cheese; Kaigokrazy; TrillGotJuice; Dylan Hyde	3:13
21.	"MASA"	Gaulden; Bingham; Lindquist	Henry 8; Haisofn	2:55
22.	"Kickboxer"	Gaulden; Rashid; Montague; Adam Gamble; Anthony Mosley	Mally Mall; ISM; Kayo the Wizard; Sean Da Firzt; Tip Beats	3:50
23.	"When Time Pass"	Gaulden; Bingham; Decastro; Leonardo Sternieri; Di Franco	Henry 8; Decastro; Gucceo; Simo Fre	2:49
24.	"Priorities"	Gaulden; Goldberg; Sven Steenbergen; Vladislav Mirzoyan	Cheese; 17OnDaTrack; BMPS	3:07
25.	"Peepin"	Gaulden; Goldberg; Brian Stewart Jr.; Daniel Steen	Cheese; BboyBeatz; Garibeats	3:47
26.	"Diesel"	Gaulden; Goldberg; Kyle Green; Sam Barsh	Cheese; Tayo; Barsh	3:46
27.	"Shot Callin"	Gaulden; Goldberg; Green; Ramos	Cheese; Tayo; TrillGotJuice	3:45
28.	"Finest"	Gaulden; Goldberg; Bradley	Cheese; JB Sauced Up	3:21
29.	"Where I Been"	Gaulden; Goldberg; Sterling Reynolds; Sacks; Horton	Cheese; LondnBlue; Sacks; TnTXD	3:34
30.	"Top Tingz"	Gaulden; Bingham; Shubhjit Balam; Kyler Mathis; Tyrek Matthews	Henry 8; Aye Reek; K10Beatz; HorridRunItUp	3:34
Total length:				93:46

Sample and interpolation credits

- "XXX" contains samples of "Sex & Violence", written by Stevie Ross and Terry Buchan, as performed by The Exploited; and an interpolation of "The Star-Spangled Banner", written and performed by Francis Scott Key.
- "I'm Ready" contains samples of "Power Trip", written by Jermaine Cole and Hubert Laws, as performed by J. Cole and Miguel.
- "Alter" contains samples of "WINDCHASER-!", written and performed by Paul Seiji.
- "Shot Callin" contains samples of "Tweaker", written by LiAngelo Ball, Stanislav Kunash, and Andrei Rodionov, as performed by Gelo.
- "Top Tingz" contains an interpolation of "Put It on Me", written by Kentrell Gaulden, Jason Goldberg, Leor Shevah, and Arjun Hasnain, as performed by YoungBoy Never Broke Again.

== Personnel ==
Credits adapted from Apple Music.

- YoungBoy Never Broke Again – vocals (all tracks), recording (tracks 27–30)
- Playboi Carti – vocals (5)
- Mellow Rackz – vocals (9)
- Henry8 – mastering (21–23), mixing (9, 12, 14, 15, 18, 21–23, 28, 30), recording (1, 9, 12, 14, 15, 18, 21–23)
- Jason "Cheese" Goldberg – mastering (1–20, 24–29), mixing (1–8, 10, 11, 13, 16, 17, 19, 20, 24–27, 29), recording (2–8, 10, 11, 13, 16, 17, 19, 20, 24–27), recording assistance (21–23)
- DJ Ryno – mastering (30)

== Charts ==
=== Weekly charts ===
Weekly performance for MASA
Chart (2025)	Peak position
Nigerian Albums (TurnTable)	86
US Billboard 200	6
US Top R&B/Hip-Hop Albums (Billboard)	3

=== Year-end charts ===
Year-end chart performance for MASA
Chart (2025)	Position
US Top R&B/Hip-Hop Albums (Billboard)	60

== Release history ==
Release dates and formats for MASA
Region	Date	Label(s)	Format(s)	Edition(s)	Ref.
Various	July 4, 2025	Never Broke Again; Motown	Digital download; streaming	MASA Sampler	
Various	July 25, 2025	Never Broke Again; Motown	Digital download; streaming	Standard	

== See also ==
- 2025 in hip-hop
- Make America Slime Again Tour
