= Fab Factory Studios =

American television and music production company

- Industry: Film; Television; Recording Studio
- Founders: Steven Fabos, Shaun Fabos
- Key people: Steven Fabos (Chairman); Shaun Fabos (CEO)
- Products: Feature films; Television shows; Music Tracks; Movie Soundtracks
- Subsidiaries: In The Black Network; Lux Angeles Studios
- Website: www.fabfactorystudios.com

Fab Factory Studios (formerly known as Fab Factory Entertainment ) is a Hollywood-based entertainment production company.

The company operates several labels around the globe and specializes in unscripted television, film, and content production.

== Aquisitions ==
In April of 2024 Fab Factory Studio acquired a stake in James DuBose’ In The Black Network.

In March of 2024, Fab Factory Studios signed a master lease of a 3-story building located at 1377 North Serrano Ave. This building formerly served as the post-production headquarters of Netflix. This building located in East Hollywood is in addition to their North Hollywood facility.

In November of 2024, Fab Factory Studios lost a bid to acquire the historic Jim Henson Studio Lot to John Mayer and McG who purchased it for $60 Million.

In June 2026, Fab Factory acquired a strategic stake in the merchandising company, Prjct Blanks Dba Milkyway Brands Milkyway Brands.

Aiming to become a production creator hub and step into the creator economy.

== Notable Events ==
On October 13-14, Fab Factory hosted THE CAMP, a huge 2-day live-streamed carnival and music event, hosted by Hit-Boy and live streamer N3on. The event drew in major creators and artists including, Big Sean, Bootleg Kev, Iggy Azalea, Ty Dolla $ign and Sexyy Red.
