= Verizon Wireless Amphitheatre =

Verizon Wireless Amphitheater(re), Verizon Wireless Music Center(re), Verizon Wireless Theatre(er), and other variants may refer to:

- The following venues were formerly known by the Verizon-sponsored names:
  - Verizon Wireless Music Center (Alabama), now Oak Mountain Amphitheatre, in Pelham, Alabama
  - Verizon Wireless Amphitheatre Irvine, now Irvine Meadows Amphitheatre in Irvine, California
  - Verizon Amphitheatre, in Alpharetta, Georgia now Ameris Bank Amphitheatre.
  - Verizon Wireless Theater, now Bayou Music Center, in Houston
  - Verizon Wireless Music Center, now Ruoff Music Center, in Noblesville, Indiana
  - Verizon Wireless Amphitheatre Kansas City, commonly known as Sandstone Amphitheater, in Bonner Springs, Kansas
  - Verizon Wireless Amphitheater St. Louis, now Hollywood Casino Amphitheatre in Maryland Heights, Missouri
  - Verizon Wireless Amphitheatre Charlotte, now Truliant Amphitheater, in Charlotte, North Carolina
  - Verizon Theatre at Grand Prairie in Grand Prairie, Texas, commonly known as the Theatre at Grand Prairie
  - Verizon Wireless Amphitheater in Selma, Texas, now Real Life Amphitheater
  - Verizon Wireless Amphitheater at Virginia Beach, now Veterans United Home Loans Amphitheater, in Virginia Beach, Virginia
