= Can You Please =

2025 single by LiAngelo Ball featuring GloRilla

Single by LiAngelo "Gelo" Ball featuring GloRilla

from the album League of My Own
- Released: March 7, 2025
- Genre: Hip-hop; dirty rap
- Length: 2:34
- Label: Def Jam
- Songwriters: LiAngelo Ball; Gloria Woods
- Producers: Issac Towner Beats; 1saused

Gelo singles chronology
| "Tweaker" (2025) | "Can You Please" (2025) | "Law n Order" (2025) |

GloRilla singles chronology
| "Hell Woods 2" (2025) | "Can You Please" (2025) | "Never Need" (2025) |

Music video
- "Can You Please" on YouTube

"Can You Please" is a song by American rapper and former basketball player LiAngelo "Gelo" Ball, released on March 7, 2025 as the second single from his debut studio album, League of My Own (2025). It features American rapper GloRilla and was produced by Issac Towner Beats and 1saused.

== Background ==
The song caught viral attention from a snippet of Gelo's brother Lonzo Ball playing the song in the Chicago Bulls locker room. It was also teased at the end of the video of his previous song, "Tweaker". "Can You Please" is Gelo's second single and first since he signed to Def Jam Recordings in January 2025.

== Composition and lyrics ==
The song contains a rattling, thumping bass, hi-hats and keys throughout the production. Much like "Tweaker", it is an uptempo track that borrows the style of early 2000s Southern hip-hop from Louisiana. The lyrics are about jewelry, designer clothes and sex, the latter of which is the main theme of GloRilla's verse. The song opens with the chorus, in which Gelo sings "I said, 'Baby, can you please shake that ass for me?' (Shake that ass, bitch) / I've been geeked up in this bitch since eleven, it's past three / Can you get up off my dick? That's a seat for the fees / I just took one hit of doja, cocked it back, now let it breathe". In the first verse, he boasts his fashion style with references to characters Homer and Maggie Simpson from The Simpsons. GloRilla explicitly describes having oral sex and warns she would be angry if it is not done as she prefers. Later on, she references the hawk tuah meme.

== Critical reception ==
The song received generally positive reviews. Elias Andrews of HotNewHipHop wrote "GELO has genuine charisma on the microphone. He's truly a case of how one says something being far more important than what's actually said. The lyrics are fine, but they are going to be fun to sing loudly. GloRilla was the perfect selection for a guest verse. She gets the energy of the song, and she brings a polished yet aggressive feel that elevates would could have been a lackluster back end. The song may not light up the world the way "Tweaker" did, but it's proof GELO is here to stay." Malcolm Trapp of Rap-Up stated "it fortunately hasn't lost its charm" and "GELO and GloRilla's voices mesh even better" than on the remix of "Tweaker" featuring Lil Wayne. Tom Breihan of Stereogum praised the collaboration, commenting "They sound great together. Gelo has hit on a style, a deep-voiced singsong slide over lo-fi, bleepy, straightforward beats. It's hard to make too many projections based on two tracks, but he’s got something. This song is good!"

== Music video ==
The music video was released on March 18, 2025 and was directed by Kid Studio and shot on 35mm film, with the directorial style taking influence from the works of Robert Altman and the Safdie brothers. It opens with Gelo leaving an orange-yellow Lamborghini parked outside a strip club at night, with butterfly doors and his song "Tweaker" playing on the radio. He visits the club, where strippers take turns pole dancing and twerking to impress him, and checks the women in the locker room as they get ready for their sets. Gelo debates how he should distribute money as he throws them at the dancers. The clip also features several scenes of Gelo and GloRilla hanging out in a room of mirrors. Gelo leaves the club and goes back into his car in the morning.

== Charts ==
Chart performance for "Can You Please"
| Chart (2025) | Peak position |
|---|---|
| New Zealand Hot Singles (RMNZ) | 10 |
| US Bubbling Under Hot 100 (Billboard) | 12 |
| US Hot R&B/Hip-Hop Songs (Billboard) | 37 |
