= Fire Your Manager =

2025 song by YoungBoy Never Broke Again and Playboi Carti

Song by YoungBoy Never Broke Again and Playboi Carti

from the album MASA
- Released: July 25, 2025
- Length: 3:53
- Label: Never Broke Again; Motown
- Songwriters: Kentrell Gaulden; Jordan Carter
- Producers: KC Da Beatmonster; Aye Shark

Audio video
- "Fire Your Manager" on YouTube

"Fire Your Manager" is a song by American rappers YoungBoy Never Broke Again and Playboi Carti, appearing as the fifth track of the former's eighth studio album, MASA (2025). The song contains a melodic chorus and verse from Carti while the refrain and second verse are handled by YoungBoy's aggressive rapping.

== Critical reception ==
Billboard's Mackenzie Cummings-Grady rated the track as the eighth best on MASA. She described the song as a "woozy intergalactic world" with playful production from KC Da Beatmonster. However, she continued that YoungBoy "does some of his best work when he’s forced outside of his adrenaline-fueled comfort zone", comparing Gaulden on the track to his feature on Tyler, the Creator's "WusYaName".

== Personnel ==
Credits and personnel adapted from Apple Music.

Musicians

- Kentrell Gaulden – lead artist, songwriter, composer
- Jordan Carter – lead artist, songwriter, composer
- KC Da Beatmonster – production, composer

Technical

- Cheese – mastering, mixing, recording

== Charts ==
Chart performance for "Fire Your Manager"
Chart (2025)	Peak position
New Zealand Hot Singles (RMNZ)	35
US Bubbling Under Hot 100 (Billboard)	11
US Hot R&B/Hip-Hop Songs (Billboard)	34
