= Finest (song) =

2025 promotional single by YoungBoy Never Broke Again

Promotional single by YoungBoy Never Broke Again

from the album MASA
- Released: May 23, 2025
- Length: 3:21
- Label: Never Broke Again; Motown
- Songwriters: Kentrell Gaulden; Jason Goldberg; Jeremy Bradley Jr.
- Producers: Cheese; JB Sauced Up

Music video
- "Finest" on YouTube

"Finest" is a song by American rapper YoungBoy Never Broke Again, released on May 23, 2025, as a promotional single from his album MASA (2025). It was produced by Cheese and JB Sauced Up. The song was surprise-released exclusively to Gaulden's YouTube channel on May 22 before being added to digital streaming platforms the following day.

== Composition ==
HotNewHipHop's Alexander Cole described the track as "melodic with YoungBoy spitting bars about all of the hardships he has faced as of late". The production from Cheese and JB Sauced Up features "a nice blend of pianos and guitars which complements his voice perfectly".

== Critical reception ==
Writing for Billboard, Mackenzie Cummings-Grady wrote that "Finest" is the best song on Gaulden's MASA. She wrote that it's "refreshing to hear YoungBoy traverse a slower and more soulful beat", and that the track is "littered with heartbreaking bars that will make anyone stop in their tracks". Cummings-Grady concluded that "'Finest' is a gut-wrenching song, and one of YB’s best in years". Pitchfork's Matthew Ritchie wrote that on the song, Gaulden feels as if "the walls [are] closing in on [Gaulden]" and that he's "pushed to the point of tears due to anxiety and desperation, haunted by the surroundings that have shaped him".

== Music video ==
The Rozay Evans-directed music video was released on May 22, 2025. It sees Gaulden in a church, repenting for his sins while back-up dancers are doing a fire performance. The video also shows clips from Gaulden's court appearances, pictures with his late family member, and a tribute to Never Broke Again-signee, Quando Rondo, at the end of the video.

== Personnel ==
Credits adapted from Tidal.

- YoungBoy Never Broke Again – vocals, engineering
- Jason "Cheese" Goldberg – mastering
- Henry8 – mixing

== Charts ==
Chart performance for "Finest"
Chart (2025)	Peak position
US Bubbling Under Hot 100 (Billboard)	16
US Hot R&B/Hip-Hop Songs (Billboard)	22
