= Melo Ball 1 =

Single by Lonzo Ball featuring Kenneth Paige
- Released: September 8, 2017
- Recorded: 2017
- Genre: Hip hop
- Length: 3:29
- Label: Big Baller Music Group
- Songwriter: Lonzo Ball
- Producer: 80's Baby Entertainment

Lonzo Ball singles chronology
"Melo Ball 1" (2017)	"ZO2" (2017)

"Melo Ball 1" is a rap single by American professional basketball player Lonzo Ball, featuring singer Kenneth Paige. Released on September 8, 2017, it is Ball's first official song and is about his younger brother LaMelo Ball and his signature Big Baller Brand shoe, the Melo Ball 1 (MB1). A segment of the song first appeared in a video published by SLAM magazine that debuted the MB1 shoes. The song was produced by 80's Baby Entertainment, Inc. under his family-owned record label Big Baller Music Group.

== Background ==
In the weeks before releasing "Melo Ball 1", Ball increased his presence in the hip hop community. On Twitter, he claimed that Issa Album by 21 Savage is better than the Jay-Z album 4:44. On his Facebook reality show Ball In The Family, Ball also said, "Don't nobody listen to Nas no more. Real hip-hop is Migos, Future." The comments caused backlash from many hip hop figures, including rapper T.I. and Nas' manager Anthony Saleh. Rapper Lil B tweeted: "Lonzo ball is a few seconds away from being cursed his rookie year on the lakers. [sic]"

On August 31, 2017, a portion of the song was featured in a video by SLAM magazine announcing the release of LaMelo Ball's signature shoe the Melo Ball 1 (MB1) by Big Baller Brand. On September 7, Ball tweeted that he would officially release the debut single in the following day.

== Reception ==
A month after the song was released, a YouTube video featuring it received more than 5.04 million views.
