= Real Life Amphitheater =

Amphitheater in Selma, Texas

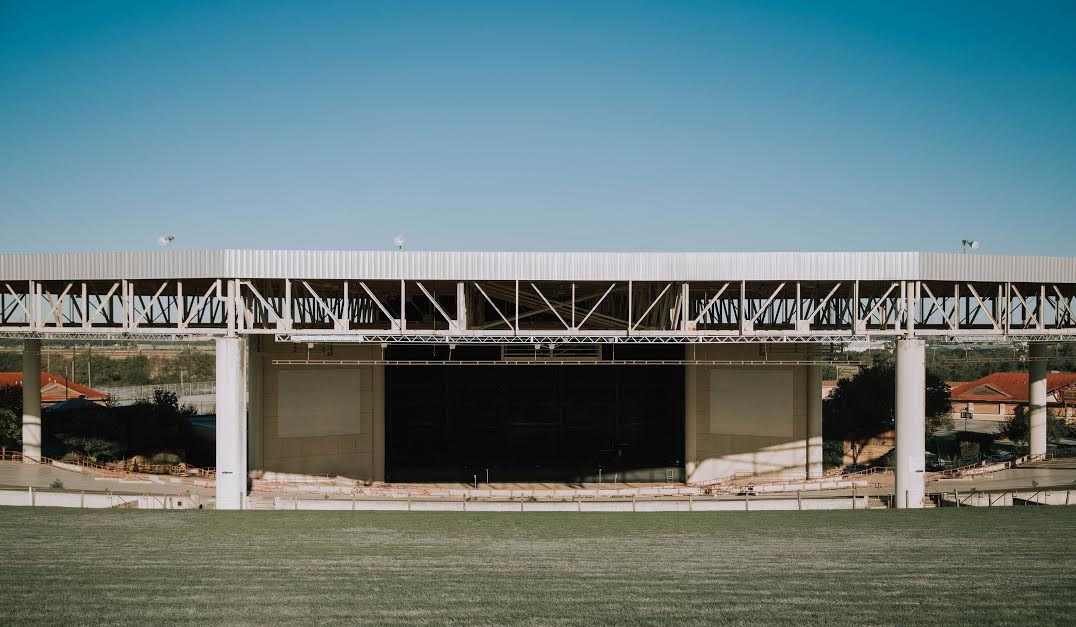
- Interactive map of Real Life Amphitheater
- Full name: Real Life Amphitheater
- Former names: Verizon Wireless Amphitheater
- Address: 16765 Lookout Rd, Selma, TX 78154
- Coordinates: 29°35′50″N 98°19′15″W
- Owner: River City Community Church
- Operator: River City Community Church
- Seating type: Reserved and lawn seating
- Capacity: 20,000
- Type: Amphitheater
- Events: Concert and event venue

Construction
- Opened: 2001, reopened 2019
- Renovated: 2018
- Expanded: 2018
- Closed: 2009, reopened in 2019

Website
- Reallifeamp.com

The Real Life Amphitheater is an open-air amphitheater, located in Selma, Texas.

In 2001 it was opened as the Verizon Wireless Amphitheater. It closed in 2009 due to a lack of performances.

Its overall capacity is 20,000, with 6,000 seated and approximately 14,000 on the lawn, and has more than 4,200 parking spaces.

The facility was purchased by River City Community Church in 2011 and hosts a wide variety of entertainment and community outreach events.

== History ==
The facility was opened in 2001 by Clear Channel Entertainment. That company's successor, Live Nation, put the facility on the market in 2007 and sold it to a Dallas-based real estate company, Stream Realty, in 2009. The sale included a 7-year restriction against its continuing use as a concert venue.

After initially considering redevelopment, Stream Realty decided to market the property for resale. Later that year, a large local church, River City Community Church, entered into a contract to buy the facility, but had to cancel the transaction (and forfeit a deposit) after failing to find financing. However, the property remained on the market, and in 2011 River City Community Church was successful in its renewed effort to buy the facility. The church commenced renovation of the facility and reopened for shows in November 2019 under the new name.

== Concerts ==
List of Concerts
- Third Eye Blind – May 6, 2001, with The Go-Go's
- Tom Petty and the Heartbreakers – May 19, 2001, with The Wallflowers, August 10, 2002, August 24, 2003 and August 26, 2008, with Steve Winwood
- Styx – May 20, 2001, with Bad Company, Survivor, Blue Öyster Cult, Billy Squier and Joe Stark and May 16, 2004, with Peter Frampton and Nelson
- Poison – May 26, 2001, with Warrant, Quiet Riot, Enuff Z'nuff, The Vince Neil Band, Great White and The BulletBoys and July 8, 2006, with Cinderella and Endeverafter
- KC's Boogie Blast – June 3, 2001, August 12, 2006 and July 29, 2007
- Journey – June 9, 2001, with Peter Frampton and John Waite, September 21, 2005 and July 25, 2008, with Cheap Trick and Heart
- Rod Stewart – June 22, 2001 and July 31, 2004
- Staind – June 29, 2001, with Rammstein, Cold and Crossbreed
- Brooks & Dunn – July 1, 2001, with Toby Keith, Montgomery Gentry, Keith Urban and Cledus T. Judd and October 22, 2005, with Deana Carter and The Warren Brothers
- Ozzfest – July 3, 2001, September 7, 2002, June 28, 2003, August 7, 2004, August 28, 2005, July 11, 2006 and August 4, 2007
- Deep Purple – July 7, 2001, with Lynyrd Skynyrd and Cheap Trick and August 27, 2004, with Thin Lizzy and The Joe Satriani Band
- Depeche Mode – July 15, 2001, with Poe
- The Dave Matthews Band – July 17, 2001, with Junior Brown, May 2, 2002, with Taj Mahal & The Hula Blues Band, July 19, 2003, with Doyle Bramhall II & Smokestack, August 18, 2004, with The Graham Colton Band and September 2, 2005, with The Victor Wooten Band
- The Warped Tour – July 21, 2001, June 30, 2002, July 18, 2003, June 27, 2004, June 26, 2005, July 2, 2006, July 13, 2007 and July 5, 2008
- The Deftones – July 28, 2001, with Godsmack and Puddle of Mudd
- Sade – July 29, 2001, with India.Arie
- The MTV Total Request Live Tour – August 3, 2001
- Blink-182 – August 9, 2001, with New Found Glory and Midtown and May 4, 2004, with Taking Back Sunday and Cypress Hill
- Willie Nelson & Family – August 11, 2001, with Dwight Yoakam, Gary Allan and Robert Earl Keen, August 3, 2002, with Lee Ann Womack and Bob Schneider and July 4, 2008, with Merle Haggard & The Strangers, Ray Price and Asleep at the Wheel
- The Barenaked Ladies – August 14, 2001
- Kenny Chesney – August 18, 2001, with Tim McGraw and Mark Collie, May 17, 2002, with Montgomery Gentry, Phil Vassar and Jamie O'Neal, April 3 and July 2, 2003, May 15, 2005, with Gretchen Wilson and Uncle Kracker and June 17, 2007, with Sugarland and Pat Green
- John Mellencamp – August 22, 2001, with The Wallflowers
- The Gipsy Kings – August 24, 2001
- James Taylor – August 25, 2001 and May 16, 2003
- Aerosmith – August 28, 2001, with Fuel, October 28, 2002, with The Stone Temple Pilots, Run–D.M.C., Kid Rock & Twisted Brown Trucker and Must and November 17, 2006, with Mötley Crüe
- Crosby, Stills & Nash – September 4, 2001
- Matchbox 20 – September 7, 2001, with Train and Davíd Garza
- Clay Walker – September 8, 2001, with Blake Shelton and Lila McCann
- The Guess Who – October 13, 2001, with Joe Cocker
- Ángeles del Infierno – October 14, 2001
- Phil Vassar – October 21, 2001
- Tool – October 25, 2001, with Tricky
- KZEP 93.3's Classic Rock Concert – November 3, 2001
- John Mayer – April 27, with Ryan Adams, September 12, 2002 and October 9, 2006
- Green Day – May 10, 2002, with Blink-182 and Jimmy Eat World
- Ricky Skaggs & Kentucky Thunder – May 24, 2002, with Robert Earl Keen, Cory Morrow, Charlie Robison and Cowboy Mouth
- Scorpions – June 7, 2002, with Deep Purple and Dio
- Kid Rock & Twisted Brown Trucker – June 8, 2002
- Chris Isaak – June 21, 2002, with Natalie Merchant
- Foreigner – June 28, 2002, with Bad Company and Cheap Trick and July 24, 2008, with Bryan Adams
- Usher – July 4, 2002, with Faith Evans
- Barry Manilow – July 6, 2002, with Curtis Stigers
- Train – July 27, 2002, with O.A.R.
- David Lee Roth – July 28, 2002, with Sammy Hagar & The Waboritas
- Weezer – August 4, 2002, with Dashboard Confessional and Sparta
- Chicago – August 9, 2002, June 12, 2004, with Earth, Wind & Fire, August 19, 2005, with Earth, Wind & Fire, June 24, 2006, with Huey Lewis and the News and April 28, 2007, with Kool & the Gang
- Marc Anthony – August 16, 2002, with Tony Lucca and Joey Vega, August 24, 2005, with Chayanne and Alejandro Fernández and July 22, 2006, with Marco Antonio Solís and Laura Pausini
- Rush – August 17, 2002, June 25, 2004 and August 12, 2007
- Lenny Kravitz – August 18, 2002, with P!nk and October 8, 2004
- Creed – September 20, 2002, with Sevendust, 12 Stones and Cinder
- Angie Stone – September 21, 2002
- Vicente Fernández – September 22, 2002
- Enrique Iglesias – October 5, 2002, with Paulina Rubio
- Montgomery Gentry – October 12, 2002
- Lil Wayne – October 19, 2002
- Maná – October 20, 2002
- Toby Keith – October 26, 2002, with The Rascal Flatts, August 16, 2003, with Blake Shelton and Junior Brown, August 14, 2004, with Terri Clark and Scotty Emerick and September 7, 2008, with Montgomery Gentry
- Incubus – October 31, 2002, with Har Mar Superstar
- KoЯn – November 2, 2002, with Disturbed, Trust Company, Earshot and Marz
- Pearl Jam – April 5, 2003, with Sleater-Kinney
- ZZ Top – April 29, 2003, with Ted Nugent and The Kenny Wayne Shepherd Band and August 5, 2007, with The Pretenders, The Stray Cats and Whitestarr
- Our Lady Peace – May 11, 2003, with Finger Eleven, Stone Sour and Seether
- Def Leppard – May 30, 2003, October 30, 2005, with Cheap Trick and Ricky Warwick, July 28, 2006, with Journey and Stoll Vaughan and August 30, 2007, with Styx and Foreigner
- The Red Hot Chili Peppers – June 13, 2003, with The Mars Volta and Snoop Dogg
- Evanescence – June 14, 2003
- Beck – June 27, 2003, with The Black Keys
- Counting Crows – July 24, 2003, with John Mayer and September 8, 2006, with Goo Goo Dolls and Eliot Morris
- tobyMac & The Diverse City Band – July 27, 2003, with Third Day and April 16, 2005
- JAY Z – August 1, 2003, with 50 Cent, Busta Rhymes and Fabolous
- Boston – August 8, 2003 and June 21, 2008, with Styx and Smash Mouth
- Lollapalooza – August 9, 2003
- Iron Maiden – August 15, 2003, with Dio and Motörhead and May 21, 2008, with Lauren Harris
- N.E.R.D – August 22, 2003, with Talib Kweli
- Joan Osborne – September 18, 2003
- The Gourds – September 20, 2003, with Los Lonely Boys
- Cher – September 27, 2003, with Tommy Drake
- KISS – October 4, 2003, with Aerosmith and Saliva and June 10, 2004, with Poison and ZO2
- LeAnn Rimes – October 11, 2003
- Good Charlotte – November 8, 2003
- The Blue Man Group – November 14, 2003, with Tracy Bonham and Venus Hum
- Drowning Pool – April 16, 2004, with Hatebreed, Unearth and Damageplan
- The Steve Miller Band – July 3, 2004 and September 29, 2006
- The John Mayer Trio – July 25, 2004, with Maroon 5 and DJ Logic
- Tim McGraw – July 30, 2004, with Big & Rich and The Warren Brothers
- Projekt Revolution – August 21, 2004 and August 3, 2007
- Sting – September 17, 2004, with Annie Lennox and Dominic Miller
- Hall & Oates – October 9, 2004, with Michael McDonald and The Average White Band
- Lynyrd Skynyrd – October 10, 2004, with The Allman Brothers Band and July 7, 2006, with 3 Doors Down and Shooter Jennings
- Norah Jones & The Handsome Band – October 16, 2004, with Amos Lee
- Gary Allan – October 17, 2004, with Dierks Bentley and Pat Green
- Velvet Revolver – October 28, 2004, with Shinedown
- Snoop Dogg – May 14, 2005, with The Game
- The Moody Blues – June 18, 2005
- Judas Priest – June 25, 2005, with Queensrÿche and August 24, 2008, with Motörhead, Testament and Heaven & Hell
- The Anger Management Tour – July 29, 2005
- 3 Doors Down – October 1, 2005, with Shinedown and Alter Bridge
- Pat Green – October 29, 2005, with Shooter Jennings and Wade Bowen
- Bryan Adams – November 12, 2005
- The Honda Civic Tour – April 9, 2006 and June 20, 2007
- Kanye West – May 6, 2006, with Daddy Yankee and Baby Bash
- Nine Inch Nails – June 2, 2006, with TV on the Radio and Bauhaus
- Sammy Hagar & The Waboritas – June 9, 2006
- The Rascal Flatts – June 17, 2006, with The Wreckers and June 22, 2008, with Taylor Swift
- Steely Dan – July 15, 2006
- The Sounds of the Underground Music Festival – July 23, 2006
- The Family Values Tour – August 4, 2006 and August 19, 2007
- Lee Rocker – August 5, 2006
- Mary J. Blige – August 9, 2006, with LeToya Luckett and Jaheim
- Earth, Wind & Fire – August 18, 2006, with Chris Botti
- Godsmack – August 26, 2006, with Rob Zombie and Shinedown
- Toots and the Maytals – September 2, 2006, with Maxi Priest
- Chris Brown – September 21, 2006, with Lil Wayne, Juelz Santana and Dem Franchize Boyz
- KISS FM 99.5's Fall Festival – October 7, 2006
- Heaven & Hell – May 1, 2007, with Megadeth and Machine Head
- Boys Like Girls – July 12, 2007
- The Automatic – July 18, 2007
- 78violet – July 24, 2007, with Drake Bell, Corbin Bleu and Bianca Ryan
- Marilyn Manson – September 1, 2007, with Slayer and Bleeding Through
- Brad Paisley & The Drama Kings – November 2–3, 2007, with Rodney Atkins and Taylor Swift and October 18, 2008, with Jewel, Chuck Wicks and Julianne Hough
- The Pre–Summer Country Music Festival – April 12, 2008
- Breaking Benjamin – April 25, 2008, with Three Days Grace and Seether
- Avril Lavigne – April 27, 2008, with Boys Like Girls
- Martina McBride – July 17, 2008, with Jack Ingram and Chris Young
- Tony Hawk's Boom Boom HuckJam – July 18, 2008
- The Crüe Fest – July 23, 2008
- The Mayhem Festival – July 26, 2008
- Santana – September 19, 2008, with The Salvador Santana Band
- The Jars of Clay – October 4, 2008, with Third Day, Switchfoot and Robert Randolph and the Family Band
- Ryan Adams and the Cardinals – October 14, 2008
- Kings of Leon – October 28, 2008

== See also ==
- List of contemporary amphitheatres
