= Tweaker (song) =

2025 single by LiAngelo Ball

Single by GELO

from the album League of My Own
- Released: January 3, 2025
- Genre: Hip hop; trap
- Length: 3:09
- Label: Def Jam
- Songwriters: LiAngelo Ball; Stanislav Kunash; Andrei Rodionov
- Producers: Kunica; Glockie Cheez

GELO singles chronology
"Tweaker" (2025)	"Can You Please" (2025)

Music video
- "Tweaker" on YouTube

"Tweaker" is the debut single by American rapper and former basketball player LiAngelo "GELO" Ball. Produced by Kunica and Glockie Cheez, the song was released on January 3, 2025, as the lead single for his debut studio album, League of My Own (2025). It immediately gained traction online and became his breakout hit. A remix of the song featuring American rapper Lil Wayne was released on February 7, 2025.

== Background ==
The beat of the song was purchased on BeatStars. In late December 2024, LiAngelo Ball previewed the song on Internet personality N3on's livestream with a snippet of the chorus. The song became a viral sensation overnight; fans and music publications compared the style to popular rap music of the 2000s, particularly Southern hip hop of New Orleans, and created Internet memes for the song. Some have compared it to soundtracks of PlayStation 2-era sports video games or entrance music for wrestlers.

"Tweaker" was released to streaming services on January 3, 2025. It became popularly played in locker rooms of NBA and NFL teams and received praise from many celebrities, including rappers Cam'ron, Cardi B, Drake, Eminem, Joe Budden, Lil Yachty, Mase, Meek Mill and T-Pain. Rappers Moneybagg Yo and Boosie expressed interest in appearing on a remix of the song. Gelo's brother Lonzo Ball was initially credited as a songwriter but confirmed that it was an error, writing on X "Only credit I deserve is the cover art lol G really that". "Tweaker" became Gelo's first charting song, debuting and peaking at number 29 on the Billboard Hot 100 dated January 18. The song became certified Platinum by the Recording Industry Association of America (RIAA) on November 17, 2025, after reaching one million copies in digital units sold.

== Composition ==
The style of the song has been compared to New Orleans rap in the bling era, especially the music of the Big Tymers, Hot Boys and Southern hip hop artists from No Limit Records, as well as that of Nelly and St. Lunatics and the "bouncier and less antic side" of 1990s Memphis rap. The instrumental contains piano and organ keys and short synthesizer pads. It has a "bouncy", "Mouse on tha Track-style" beat, with percussion and bass pattern similar to that of NOLA rap production. Performing in a singsong flow, Gelo brags about spending money luxuriously and time with women and rising to fame, as well as how he "might swerve, bend that corner (whoa)" in a new car during the chorus. The "whoa" is lengthened in sound, which has been described as reminiscent of the hook of "Big Ballin" by the Big Tymers.

== Critical reception ==
The song received generally mixed reviews from music critics. Zachary Horvath of HotNewHipHop pointed out that "Some were messing with it and others couldn't take it any less seriously. It's probably because it's got potential meme status written all over it due to the base-level mixing and sort of goofy vocals on the chorus." Jordan Darville of The Fader commented "'Tweaker' is NBA Live, pristine Air Force 1s, and AND1 Mixtapes. It's the soundtrack for a touchdown in Madden, but also the sweaty, anxious, slightly smelly gymnasium that hosted your first school dance. For rap fans of a certain age, it brings back an era with near-tactile precision; for younger ones who don't remember the specifics, it turns those memories into an enviable aesthetic." He went on to write that "The rest of 'Tweaker' doesn't sustain the momentum of its viral excerpt. Ball's verses shift from the hook's fun FUBU-colored vibes to more grim and violent platitudes that feel more like Ball is checking boxes than creating something true." Pitchfork's Alphonse Pierre stated "In reality, 'Tweaker' is probably funnier than it is good. His 'woahs' and 'ahhs' are catchy and it's hilarious to imagine the Ball brothers sitting around their mansion studying Big Tymers tapes and 70th Street Carlos loosies. The inspiration for the retro sound is probably more conventional, though: The Ball bros just like YoungBoy and maybe a little Kevin Gates, both of whom pull heavily from Louisiana's past. The most interesting parts of 'Tweaker' were likely absorbed through osmosis, so I'm unwilling to call it anything other than the first hilarious viral rap song of 2025. But, with that said, I'd be trippin' if I didn't mention the next snippet sounds like a step up." Complex's Nigel Washington regarded the "elongated 'Wooaahhhoooaahh' and 'Shoooowoooaahh' in the hook" as the "best part of the song". Jon Caramanica of The New York Times described the song as "deceptively lo-fi and unwieldy, but directly effective — art passing as a joke." He remarked the chorus "is perfectly shaped, if a little slang-by-numbers", but "On the verses, Ball's vocals are less surly, a little more shrieked and less convincing. Sometimes it sounds like he's herding more syllables than space allows. The beat is built around a piano figure that sounds accidental, or drunk, like it was played with chubby fingers, adding to the song's air of legitimate-illegitimate uncertainty." Andre Gee of Rolling Stone wrote "The verses are animated but pretty ordinary; the main moment here is the chorus, which feels plucked straight from the tall tee era." He added that "'Tweaker,' with its NOLA bounce-inspired percussion and kitschy hook, sounds like a 2004 approach to modern rap."

HotNewHipHop ranked the song as the 14th best rap song of 2025.

== Music video ==
An official music video premiered on January 30, 2025. It was directed by HPLA and filmed in Los Angeles and Chicago. The clip starts with Gelo and his brothers Lonzo and LaMelo Ball riding around in a yellow Hummer, before entering a nightclub where he parties with women. Gelo is seen rapping in the club, beside various luxury cars, and into the microphones of a crowd of reporters. At the end of the video, Gelo is asked, "So, what's next?", followed by a 10-second snippet teasing his song "Can You Please".

== Charts ==
=== Weekly charts ===
Weekly chart performance for "Tweaker"
Chart (2025)	Peak position
Australia (ARIA)	41
Canada (Canadian Hot 100)	27
Global 200 (Billboard)	56
Ireland (IRMA)	79
New Zealand (Recorded Music NZ)	14
UK Singles (Official Charts)	84
US Billboard Hot 100	29
US Hot R&B/Hip-Hop Songs (Billboard)	7
US Rhythmic (Billboard)	1

=== Year-end charts ===
Year-end chart performance for "Tweaker"
Chart (2025)	Position
US Hot R&B/Hip-Hop Songs (Billboard)	25
US Rhythmic Airplay (Billboard)	31

== Certifications ==
Region	Certification	Certified units/sales
United States (RIAA)	Platinum	1,000,000^{‡}
^{‡} Sales+streaming figures based on certification alone.
