= N3on =

American streamer and YouTuber (born 2004)

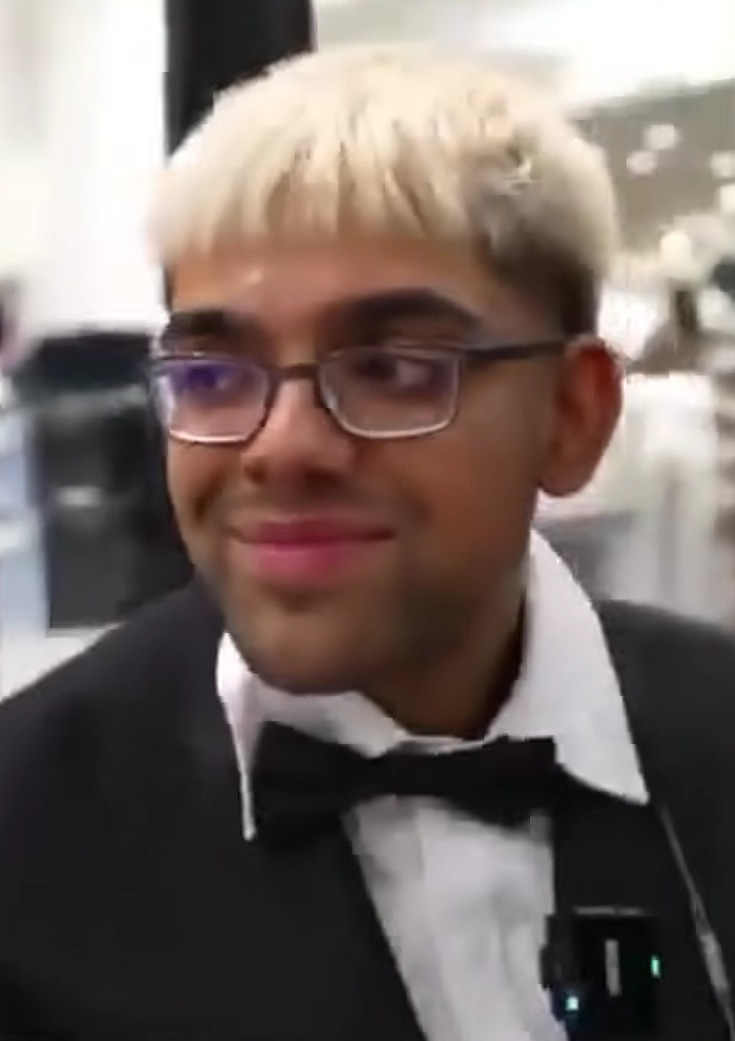
- N3on in 2026
- Born: Mikyle Rafiq (Note: N3on's real name has been cited by XXL as Rangesh Mutama. Business Insider originally reiterated this claim, but published a correction affirming that his name is Mikyle Rafiq.); August 13, 2004 (age 22); Houston, Texas, U.S.
- Education: Elkins High School
- Years active: 2016–present

Instagram information
- Page: n3onsingh
- Followers: 1.5 million

Kick information
- Channel: n3on
- Years active: 2023–2025, 2026–present
- Followers: 730 thousand

Twitch information
- Channel: N3on
- Years active: 2019–2023, 2025–2026
- Followers: 618 thousand

YouTube information
- Channel: N3ON
- Subscribers: 1.14 million
- Views: 374 million
- Last updated: August 25, 2026

Mikyle Rafiq (born August 13, 2004), known online as N3on, is an American streamer and YouTuber. He originally uploaded YouTube videos playing games such as NBA 2K and Fortnite. In 2023, N3on began to stream on Kick and became recognized through his streams with rappers.

N3on is known for his controversial persona involving staged acts and a network of paid "clippers" that promote a negative public perception of him to gain momentum, although he has stated that he would like to be more true to himself and pursue a more positive identity.

== Early life ==
Mikyle Rafiq was born on August 13, 2004, in Houston, Texas, to Pakistani and Indian parents. His father helps him manage the money he makes from streaming. N3on is a Muslim. For most of his childhood, he was afflicted by Crohn's disease, which led to him frequenting hospitals and completing much of his schoolwork online. Due to his inability to attend school in-person for periods at a time, he began to play video games, sharing a PlayStation 4 with his younger brother. He attended Elkins High School in Missouri City, Texas, graduating in 2022.

== Career and controversy ==
N3on first created his YouTube channel in 2016, at the age of 11, and recorded himself playing video games and making tutorials. By the time he turned 16 in 2020, he had gained popularity through his gameplay of NBA 2K and Fortnite, here he would have often have brazen and explicit outbursts. In 2019, he faked his own death.

Streamer Adin Ross encouraged N3on to stream in public, leading to N3on building an audience on Twitch. In 2023, N3on moved to Kick due to higher monetization.

In March 2024, N3on was banned from Kick after threatening to dox and sexually assault an underage fan after getting in a heated argument with them. He later released an apology video about the incident and was subsequently unbanned. In April, he was arrested in Dubai after filming a police officer, spending nearly two days in jail. In February 2025, police broke up a crowd of 200 people in Kensington, Philadelphia, where N3on and rapper Skrilla were livestreaming. Skrilla was there to shoot a music video, but did not have a permit for it.

In May 2025, N3on signed a record deal with Empire. It followed the virality of LiAngelo Ball's song "Tweaker" after he first previewed it on N3on's livestream earlier that year. In September, he joined Iggy Azalea as the co-owner of Motherland, an online casino. In March 2026, Motherland was acquired by Gamdom, leading to Azalea and N3on signing ambassador contracts with the company. In August of that year, N3on also signed a contract with the crypto casino Jack.com. In October 2025, N3on announced a collaborative series of EPs with Hit-Boy titled N3on x Hit-Boy Presents The Camp. In November 2025, the Joe Budden Podcast discussed N3on, with co-host Emanny questioning past problematic comments.

N3on was arrested by police in March 2026 after attempting to enter the O Block apartment complex in Chicago, claiming that he was trying to host a giveaway for children. Later in 2026, a character heavily resembling N3on appeared in the Grand Theft Auto VI: An Extended Look video, prompting him to recreate it in real life. That year, in a deal with Higgsfield, the company licensed an AI N3on avatar. N3on described the partnership as getting him a "pretty good check," noting the little effort needed. On August 24, N3on provided financial support to former homeless NBA guard Delonte West. On September 7, 2026, N3on announced his last livestream as he was making a change to AI streaming powered by GPT-6 Astra and Higgsfield AI.

== Content and style ==
N3on's content was characterized by provocative, often controversial stunts, having been accused of transphobia in the past. N3on was known for 'clip farming' and high-energy streams. However, in early 2025, he reflected on his persona and shifted away from the style in favor of less extreme content. Since then, N3on has collaborated with celebrities Kanye West, Arman Tsarukyan, Iggy Azalea, Alabama Barker, and Delonte West. N3on also does gambling and martial arts-related streams. By September 2026, N3on began airing 24/7 AI-Generated streams of himself alongside actual streams.

== Feuds ==
=== Jack Doherty ===
In March 2024, N3on criticized fellow streamer Jack Doherty, claiming that he coerced young girls into signing OnlyFans contracts. In his unsubstantiated accusation, he alleged that Doherty got 17-year-old girls drunk the night before their birthdays and then got them to sign contracts that give 50% of their lifetime earnings to Doherty.

=== DD Osama ===
In March 2025, N3on was confronted by rapper DD Osama and his entourage for disrespecting Osama's deceased brother and insulting the former; N3on apologized.

=== Adin Ross ===
Despite early encouragement, streamer Adin Ross had distanced himself from N3on following his controversial incidents. Ross spoke out after N3on's arrest in Dubai in April 2024, and their relationship remained strained until January 2025. Due to N3on's personal growth and content shift, Ross publicly commended him during a January 24 stream. N3on responded to the comment on his own stream, saying "It means a lot, bro," reflecting on his friendship with Ross.

=== Charlamagne Tha God ===
In July 2025, Charlamagne Tha God and Jess Hilarious confronted N3on about racism during The Breakfast Club. Charlamagne brought up N3on's past controversial statements when he compared Kai Cenat's mother to Harriet Tubman while criticizing his allegedly racist viewers. During the interview, streamer Adin Ross allegedly commented that the hosts were trying to belittle him, prompting further pushback from the hosts. Later in the conversation, the hosts gave N3on credit for holding his ground while N3on addressed his viewers writing racist comments. N3on later criticized the way Charlamagne handled the interview, calling it an interrogation room.
