= ZO2 =

Single by Lonzo Ball
- Released: September 28, 2017
- Recorded: 2017
- Genre: Hip hop
- Length: 2:27
- Label: Big Baller Music Group
- Songwriter: Lonzo Ball
- Producer: 80's Baby Entertainment

Lonzo Ball singles chronology
"Melo Ball 1" (2017)	"ZO2" (2017)	"Super Saiyan" (2017)

"ZO2" is a rap single by American professional basketball player Lonzo Ball. Released on September 28, 2017, it is Ball's second single and revolves around his signature "ZO2" shoes by Big Baller Brand. The song was produced by 80's Baby Entertainment, Inc. under his family-owned record label Big Baller Music Group.

== Background ==
A week before the release of Ball's second track, Big Baller Brand announced a redesign to its ZO2 Prime sneakers, the signature shoe of Lonzo Ball. The announcement came as Ball's shoe choice for his National Basketball Association (NBA) preseason games were drawing national attention from outlets like ESPN. A portion of the "ZO2" song was featured at the time. The release of "ZO2" followed Ball's first rap single "Melo Ball 1," which also featured a Big Baller Brand shoe but for his younger brother LaMelo.

== Reception ==
After it was made public, "ZO2" made headlines on several websites including CBSSports.com, SB Nation, and 247Sports.com. Ball's criticism of the National Collegiate Athletic Association (NCAA), with the line "Only one year I was done with the Bruins / Slavin' for free, I was offered to move it / Millions of dollars, I took it, I'm human / I'm taking that case, I don't care if I lose it," was seen as a particularly surprising line. As of March 2019, the most popular YouTube video of the song has received over 12.58 million views.
