= Lonzo Ball =

American basketball player (born 1997)

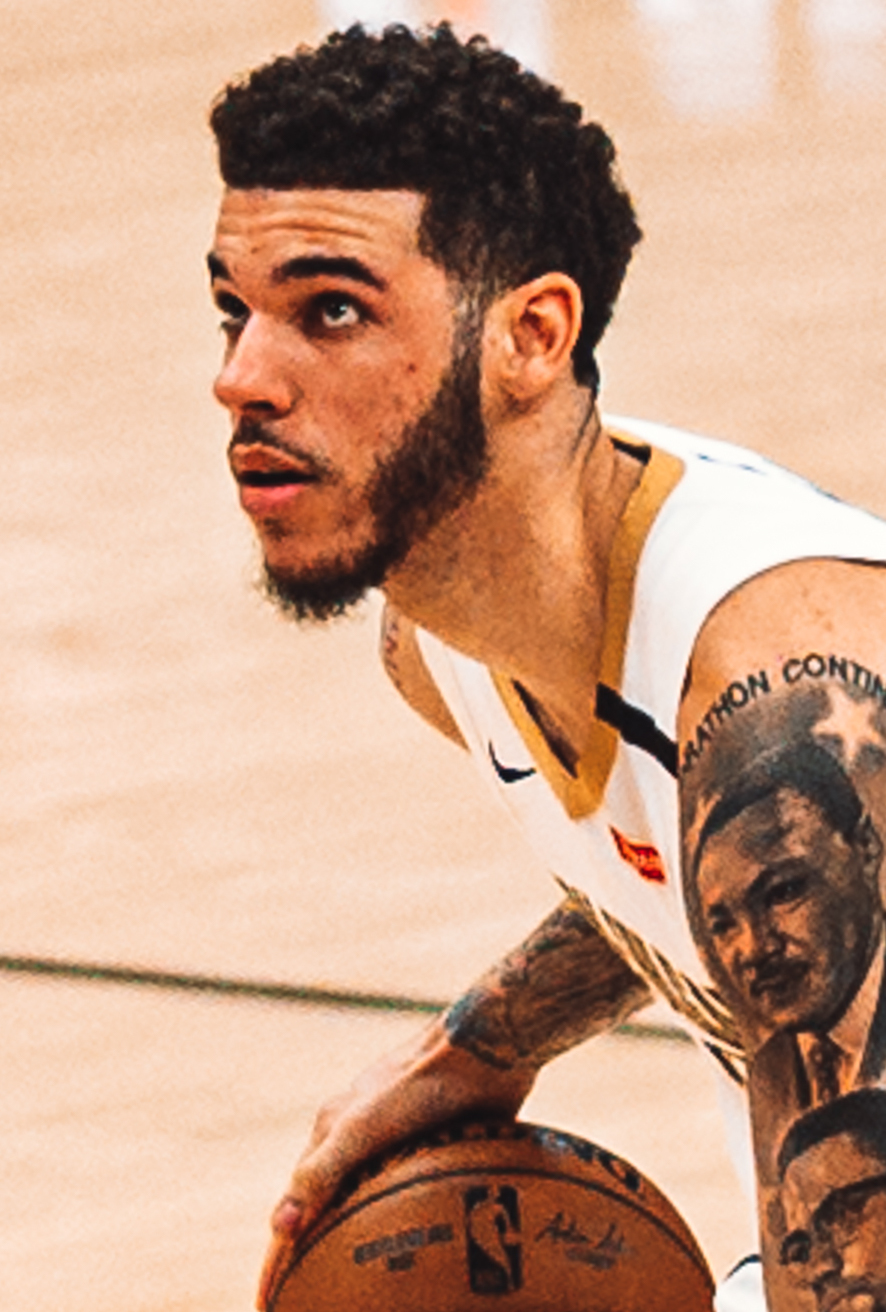
- Ball with the New Orleans Pelicans in 2020

Free agent
- Position: Point guard

Personal information
- Born: October 27, 1997 (age 29) Anaheim, California, U.S.
- Listed height: 6 ft 5 in (1.96 m)
- Listed weight: 190 lb (86 kg)

Career information
- High school: Chino Hills (Chino Hills, California)
- College: UCLA (2016–2017)
- NBA draft: 2017: 1st round, 2nd overall pick
- Drafted by: Los Angeles Lakers
- Playing career: 2017–present

Career history
- 2017–2019: Los Angeles Lakers
- 2019–2021: New Orleans Pelicans
- 2021–2025: Chicago Bulls
- 2025–2026: Cleveland Cavaliers

Career highlights
- NBA All-Rookie Second Team (2018); Consensus first-team All-American (2017); Wayman Tisdale Award (2017); NABC Freshman of the Year (2017); NCAA assists leader (2017); First-team All-Pac-12 (2017); Pac-12 Freshman of the Year (2017); National high school player of the year (2016); McDonald's All-American (2016); California Mr. Basketball (2016)
- Stats at NBA.com
- Stats at Basketball Reference

Lonzo Anderson Ball (born October 27, 1997) is an American professional basketball player who last played for the Cleveland Cavaliers of the National Basketball Association (NBA). A point guard, he played college basketball for one season with the UCLA Bruins, earning consensus first-team All-American honors before the Los Angeles Lakers selected him with the second overall pick of the 2017 NBA draft. He was named to the NBA All-Rookie Second Team in 2018.

As a senior at Chino Hills High School in 2016, Ball was awarded multiple national high school player of the year honors, and led his team, alongside his brothers LiAngelo and LaMelo, to an undefeated 35–0 record and the consensus national top ranking. As a college freshman in 2016–17, he led the nation in assists and broke the UCLA record for the most assists in a season. Ball also won the Wayman Tisdale Award as the top freshman in the nation.

As an NBA rookie with the Lakers, his playing time was limited by shoulder and knee injuries, and he was sidelined for much of his second season after an ankle injury. He was traded at the end of the season to the New Orleans Pelicans in a trade package for Anthony Davis. He played two seasons with the Pelicans before joining the Chicago Bulls in a sign-and-trade deal, but a persistent knee injury sidelined him for the majority of his tenure with the team, with him missing the entirety of the 2022–23 and 2023–24 seasons. After the 2024–25 season, Ball was traded to the Cleveland Cavaliers.

== Early life ==
Ball was born in Anaheim, California, to LaVar and Tina Ball, who were both former college basketball players. The 6-foot-6-inch (1.98 m) Ball started playing basketball at the age of two. He idolized LeBron James, who he began following around age six while James was a first-year NBA player with Cleveland. Ball grew up with his younger brothers, LiAngelo and LaMelo. Until they reached high school, the trio played together on teams coached by their father. Ball played basketball at Chino Hills High School in Chino Hills, California. As a junior in 2014–15, he averaged 25 points, 11 rebounds, 9.1 assists, 5 blocks, and 5 steals. In his senior year, he led the school to a 35–0 record and a state title, and the Huskies were ranked the consensus No. 1 team in the nation. His younger brothers, junior LiAngelo and freshman LaMelo, were also on the team, as well as his cousin Andre. Ball averaged a triple-double with averages of 23.9 points, 11.3 rebounds, and 11.7 assists per game. He received national honors, including the Naismith Prep Player of the Year, Morgan Wootten National Player of the Year, USA Today Boys Basketball Player of the Year, and Mr. Basketball USA.

By the end of his senior year, Ball was rated as a consensus five-star recruit in the 2016 high school class. He was ranked No. 4 overall recruit in the 2016 class behind Harry Giles, Josh Jackson and Jayson Tatum by both Rivals.com and ESPN, while Scout.com ranked him at No. 7 despite his previous ranking of several months as the No. 1 player in the country. In November 2015, he signed a National Letter of Intent to attend the University of California, Los Angeles (UCLA), and play for the Bruins.

== College career ==
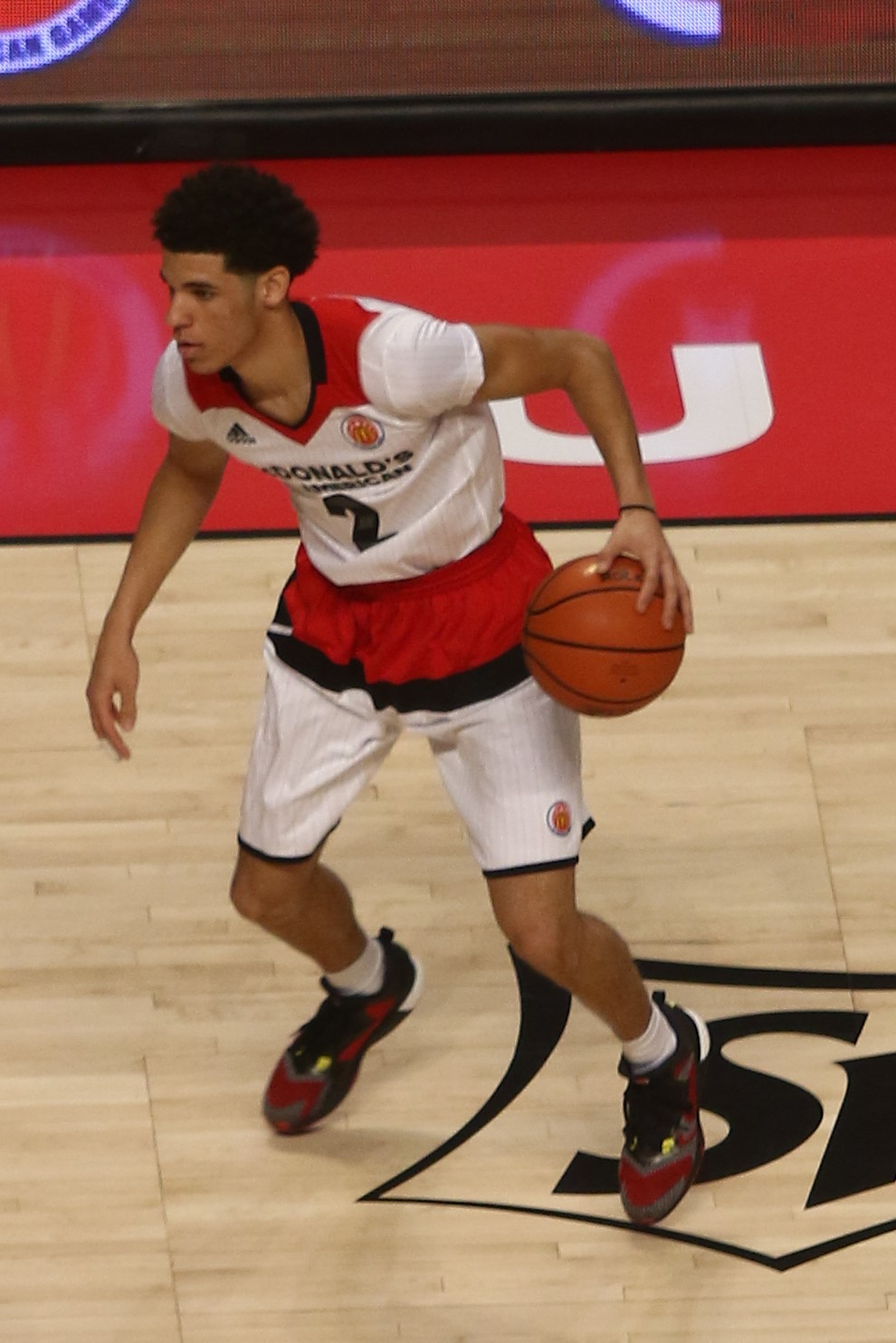
Ball playing in the 2016 McDonald's All-American Game.

As a freshman at UCLA in 2016–17, he was one of 50 players named to the preseason watch list for the John R. Wooden Award, given annually to the top college player in the nation. Ball's vision and passing skills led UCLA's rise up the national rankings, as he and fellow freshman T. J. Leaf helped the Bruins bounce back from a 15–17 record from the year before to a 31–5 record. Ball led the nation in assists and transformed the Bruins into the top scoring offense in the country. In his first collegiate game against Pacific, he had 19 points, 11 assists, and eight rebounds.

Later in the year, Ball was named the most valuable player (MVP) of the Wooden Legacy tournament, after he led UCLA to a win over Texas A&M in the championship game. He remained on the Wooden Award list in midseason, when he was also joined by Leaf, as UCLA was one of just five schools with two candidates on the list.

On February 4, 2017, in a 107–66 blowout win against the Washington Huskies, Ball had 22 points, six rebounds, and five assists. With close to two dozen NBA executives in attendance, the game matched Ball against the Huskies' Markelle Fultz, who were among the nation's top point guards and projected to be among the top picks in the 2017 NBA draft. Fultz scored 25 points in an even matchup between the two freshmen. In the Bruins' regular season finale, Ball had a career-high 14 assists in a 77–68 win over Washington State, when he also broke Gary Payton's 30-year-old Pac-12 season record for assists by a freshman. UCLA was seeded No. 3 in the NCAA tournament, and won their opening game 97–80 over Kent State. Ball had 15 points and three assists to surpass Larry Drew II's school record for most assists in a season. In the second round, he came close to a triple-double with 18 points, seven rebounds, and nine assists in a 79–67 win over Cincinnati. All of his assists came in the second half, when UCLA overcame a three-point halftime deficit after scoring a season-low 30 points in the first half. The Bruins were eliminated in the Sweet 16, losing 86–75 to Kentucky. Ball had 10 points, eight assists, and four turnovers in the loss, while Wildcats point guard De'Aaron Fox scored 39 points for an NCAA tournament freshman record. Ball strained his hamstring in the game but played through it and was limping in the second half. Ball did not offer it as an excuse for being outplayed. After the game, he announced that he would declare for the 2017 NBA draft, where he was generally projected to be a top-3 pick.

For the season, Ball averaged 14.6 points, 7.6 assists, and 6.0 rebounds. He was the only player in the nation to average at least 14 points, six assists, and six rebounds, and was the first player in the conference since California's Jason Kidd in 1993–94 to average at least 14 points, seven assists, and six rebounds. His 274 assists also passed Kidd (272) for the second-most in a season by a Pac-12 player, behind only Ahlon Lewis (294) of Arizona State in 1997–98. Ball made 55.1 percent of his field goal attempts and 41.2 of his three-point attempts to become the first NCAA Division I player since 1992–93 to make at least 70 percent from the 2-point range and 40 percent from the 3-point range. He was a unanimous first-team All-American, earning honors from the Associated Press, United States Basketball Writers Association (USBWA), National Association of Basketball Coaches (NABC), and Sporting News. Additionally, he was awarded the Wayman Tisdale Award by the USBWA as the top freshman in the nation. Ball was the only freshman that year to be a finalist for the Wooden Award, Naismith College Player of the Year, and Oscar Robertson Trophy. He was also voted Pac-12 Freshman of the Year, named first-team All-Pac-12 along with teammates Leaf and Bryce Alford, and received honorable mention for the Pac-12 All-Defensive Team.

== Professional career ==
=== Los Angeles Lakers (2017–2019) ===
==== 2017–18 season: Rookie season ====
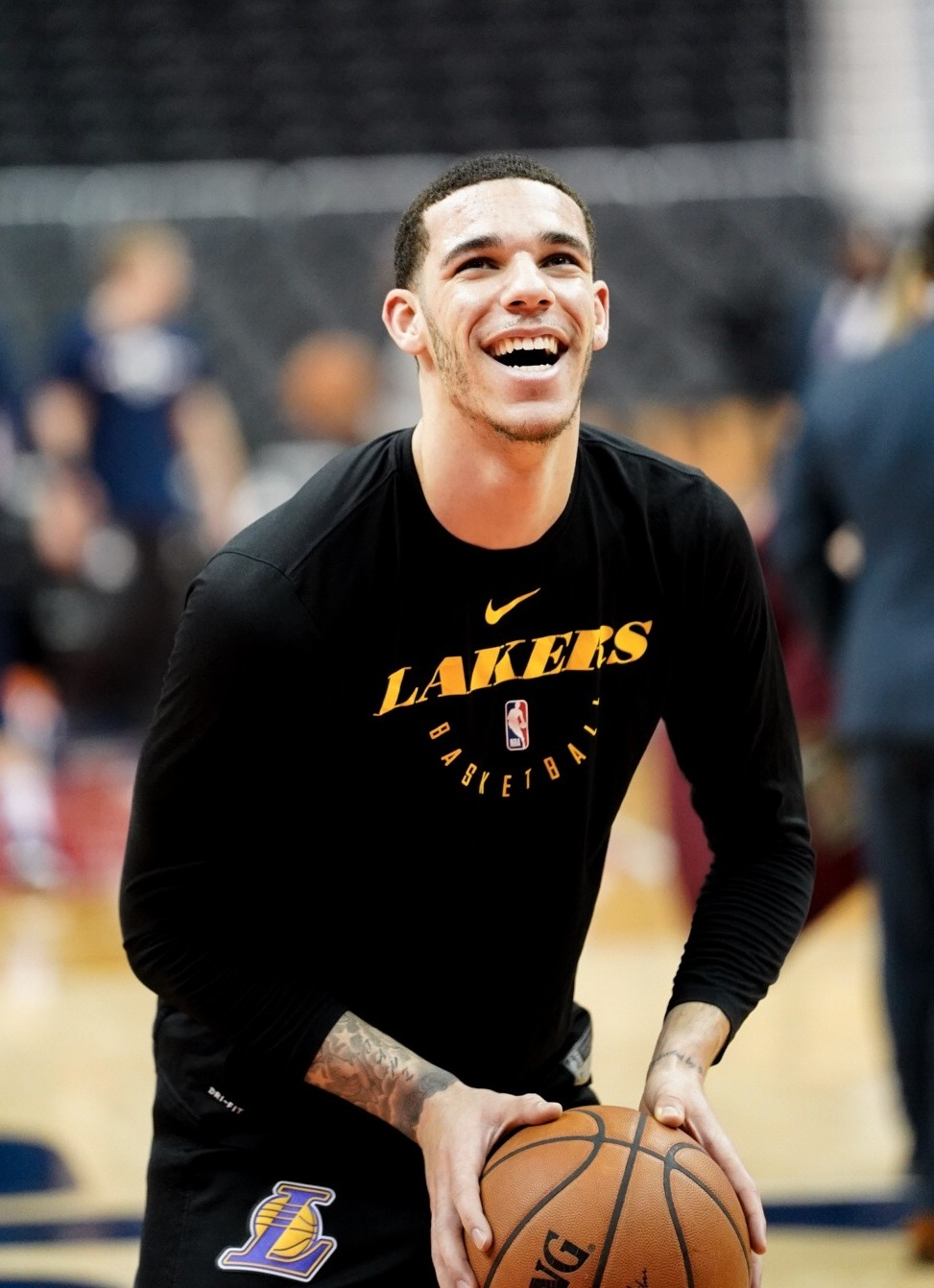
Ball in 2018

Ball was selected with the second overall pick of the 2017 NBA draft by his hometown team the Los Angeles Lakers. It was the third straight year they had the No. 2 pick. He and Brandon Ingram, their second overall pick from the previous year, headlined a young core for the Lakers. D'Angelo Russell, their No. 2 pick in 2015, was traded days earlier, partly to clear the way for their newly drafted point guard. Lakers president of basketball operations Magic Johnson billed Ball as "the new face of the Lakers." During the 2017 NBA Summer League in Las Vegas, Ball was named the league MVP after averaging 16.3 points, 9.3 assists, 7.7 rebounds, 2.5 steals, and 1.0 blocks per game. He had two triple-doubles, the first in Vegas since 2008 and the first ever in Vegas by a rookie. He had four games with 10 or more assists, becoming the first in league history to have more than 10 assists in more than one game; his 9.3 assist average was also a league record.

As a rookie in 2017–18, Ball played in 52 games, missing 30 games due to shoulder and knee injuries. In the second game of the season on October 20, 2017, he scored a then career-high 29 points, to go along with 11 rebounds and nine assists in a 132–130 win against the Phoenix Suns, falling one assist shy of becoming the youngest player to notch a triple-double in NBA history. In the following game, he had eight points, eight rebounds, and 13 assists in a 119–112 loss to the New Orleans Pelicans, becoming the youngest player in franchise history to get at least 10 assists in a game. On November 11, he recorded 19 points, 13 assists, and 12 rebounds in a 98–90 loss against the Milwaukee Bucks, becoming the youngest player at the time to achieve a triple-double at the age of 20 years and 15 days old, breaking James' record by five days. Leading up to the game, Bucks' coach Jason Kidd, whom Ball is often compared to, had called it "a stretch" to compare the two since it was too early in Ball's career. Ball, who had been struggling with his shooting, made over 50% of his field goals in a game for the first time in his career. On November 19, he recorded his second triple-double with 11 points, 16 rebounds, and 11 assists in a 127–109 win over the Denver Nuggets. It was the most rebounds by an NBA rookie guard since Steve Francis had 17 in 1999–2000. He also joined fellow NBA rookie Ben Simmons, as well as Magic Johnson, Connie Hawkins, Art Williams, and Oscar Robertson as the only players to record multiple triple-doubles within the first 20 games of their NBA careers.

Ball missed the team's Christmas game after spraining his left shoulder in the previous game against the Portland Trail Blazers. He returned after missing six games, playing in five games before spraining the medial collateral ligament (MCL) in his left knee against the Dallas Mavericks on January 13, 2018. Originally, he was expected to be sidelined for one to three weeks. Ball was selected to play in the Rising Stars Challenge during NBA All-Star Weekend, but withdrew because of the injury. He returned after the All-Star break after missing 15 games. On February 23, he played 17 minutes and had nine points, seven rebounds and six assists in a 124–102 victory against the Mavericks. It was the first game he played all season that he did not start. He was also on a minutes restriction, and the Lakers held him out of their following game to limit his back-to-back games during his return. Ball missed the final eight games of the season due to a knee contusion. He ended the season with averages of 10.2 points, 7.2 assists and 6.9 rebounds, but made only 36 percent of his field goals. He was named to the NBA All-Rookie Second Team, while fellow rookie teammate Kyle Kuzma exceeded expectations and earned First Team honors.

==== 2018–19 season: Sophomore season ====
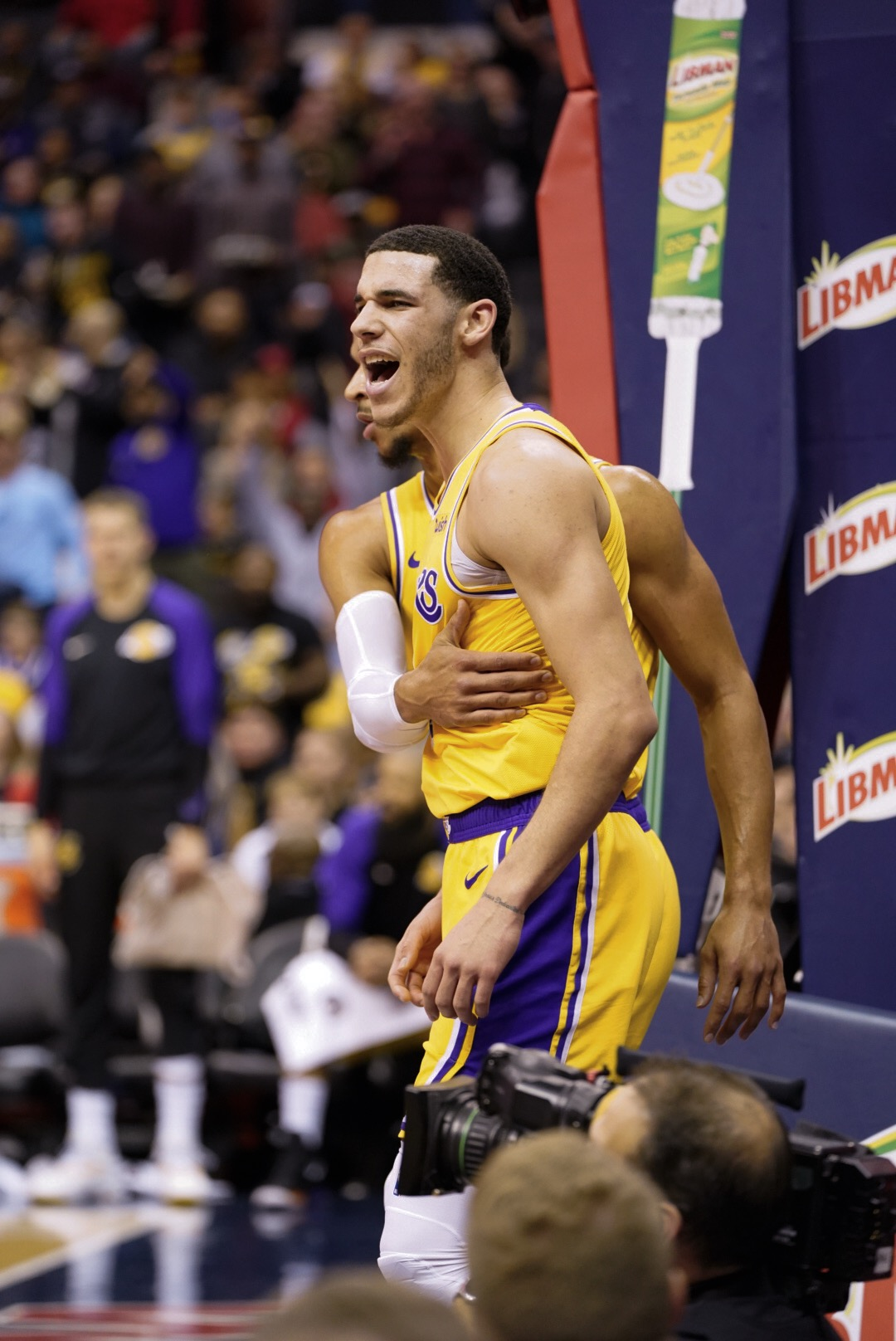
Ball upset during a game in 2018

On July 17, 2018, Ball underwent an arthroscopic surgery on his left knee to repair a torn meniscus. During the offseason, the Lakers signed the four-time NBA Most Valuable Player LeBron James, which shifted the spotlight away from Ball. They also signed veteran point guard Rajon Rondo to mentor and compete with the youngster. A week before camp, Lakers coach Luke Walton stated that Ball would be eased back and not participate in full-contact practices initially.

Ball's added bulk made him better on defense, and he became one of the Lakers' most dynamic defenders during the season as he picked up point guards full-court to create turnovers in the backcourt. On offense, he had to adjust to playing off the ball more with James often handling the ball. On December 15, in a 128–100 win against the Charlotte Hornets, the duo became the first teammates to achieve a triple-double in the same game since Jason Kidd and Vince Carter did it in 2007, with Ball posting 16 points, 10 rebounds, and 10 assists, while James had 24 points, 12 rebounds, and 11 assists. The last Lakers teammates to accomplish the feat were Johnson and Kareem Abdul-Jabbar in 1982. It was Ball's third triple-double of his career and his first in over a year. On January 19, 2019, he had a career-high seven assists in a quarter to help the Lakers build a 13-point lead over the Houston Rockets after the first period. In the third quarter, he collided with the Rockets' James Ennis III and suffered a Grade 3 left ankle sprain, which included a torn ligament. Ball left the game with 11 assists in 22 minutes and the team up by 18 points, but the Lakers lost the game in overtime 138–134. He had suffered two other ankle injuries earlier in the season, but had been able to play in all of the team's first 47 games. Since Walton called him out for being passive after a 108–86 loss against the Minnesota Timberwolves, he had been averaging 13 points, 6.4 rebounds and 8.4 assists with nearly two steals over seven games before the injury. Ball was selected again for the Rising Stars game, but he was ruled out again because of his ankle injury. In late February, he traveled to Ohio to potentially undergo surgery. However, this surgery was not authorized by the Lakers, so the team informed him that his contract could be voided if he proceeded, and successfully talked him out of it. Originally expected to be sidelined for four to six weeks, he was shut down for the rest of the season in March.

=== New Orleans Pelicans (2019–2021) ===
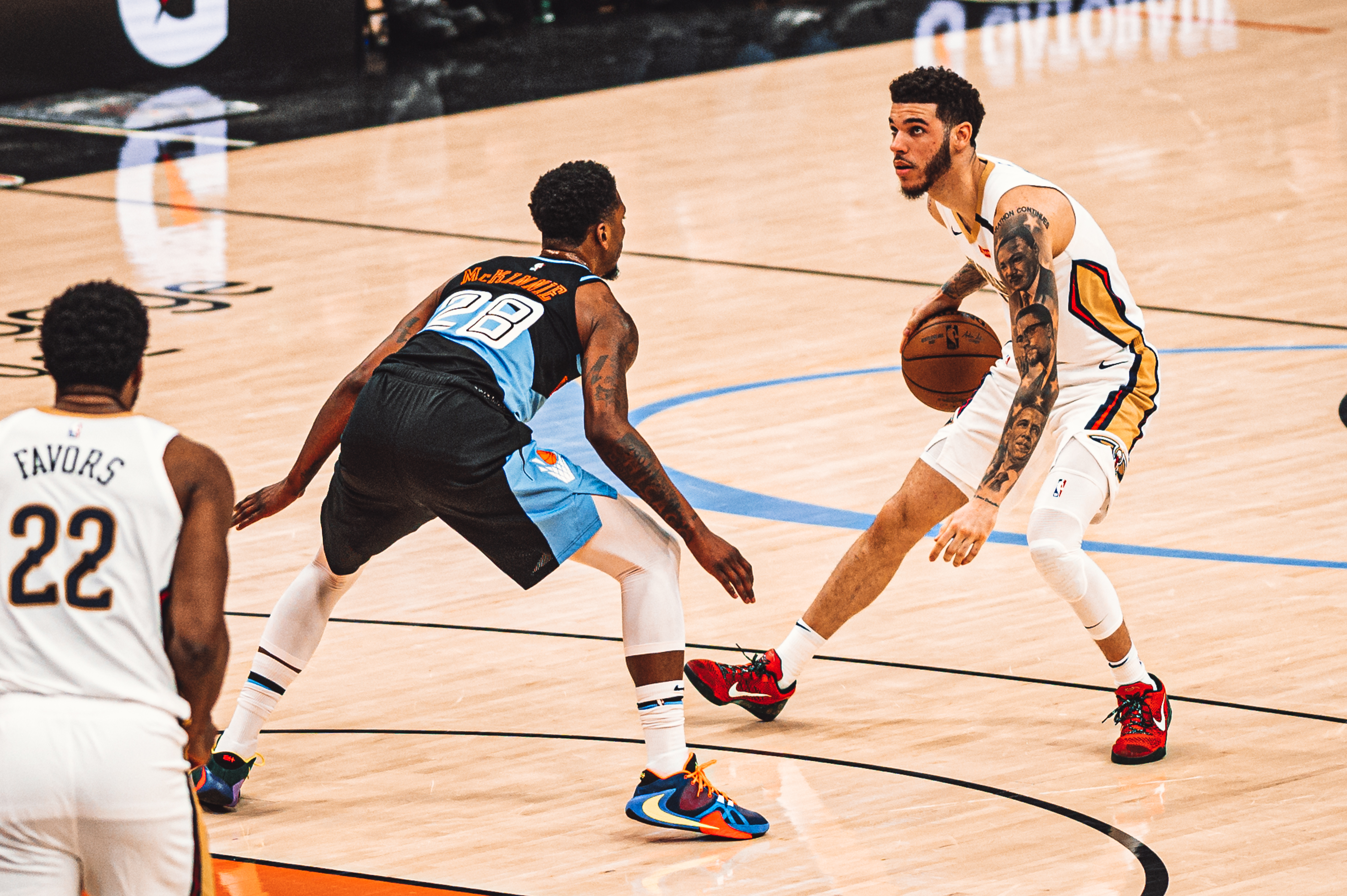
Ball playing for the New Orleans Pelicans in 2020.

On July 6, 2019, the Lakers traded Ball, Ingram, Josh Hart, the draft rights to De'Andre Hunter, two first-round draft picks, a first-round pick swap and cash to New Orleans in exchange for All-Star Anthony Davis. Ball made his debut for the Pelicans on October 22, registering eight points, five rebounds, and five assists in a 130–122 overtime loss to the defending champion Toronto Raptors. On December 29, he hit a then career-high seven three-pointers, and scored a season-high 27 points, to go with 10 rebounds, and eight assists in a 127–112 win over the Rockets. On January 18, 2020, he recorded his first triple-double of the season with 18 points, 10 rebounds, and 11 assists in a 133–130 loss to the Los Angeles Clippers. On March 3, he matched his then career-high seven three-pointers, while recording 26 points and eight assists in a 139–134 loss to the Timberwolves. He also made seven three-pointers the following day, finishing with 25 points, 11 rebounds, and six assists in a 127–123 overtime loss to the Dallas Mavericks. From December 2019 to March 2020, in a 45-game span, he averaged 12.7 points, 7.3 assists, and 6.7 rebounds while shooting 39.2% from three.

Heading into the 2020–21 season, Ball was at his healthiest. New Pelicans coach Stan Van Gundy placed him in a 3-and-D role, which he had never played before. On January 29, 2021, Ball matched his then career-high seven three-pointers, and scored a season-high 27 points, in a 131–126 win over the Bucks. On April 5, Ball set a new career-high eight three-pointers, while matching his season-high 27 points and registering nine assists in a 122–115 win over the Rockets. On May 1, Ball matched his career-high eight three-pointers while recording a career-high 33 points, alongside 11 rebounds and eight assists in a 140–136 OT win against the Minnesota Timberwolves. On May 4, Ball matched his career-high 33 points in a 108–103 win against the Golden State Warriors. He ended the season with career highs in scoring (14.6), 3-point percentage (37.8%), field goal percentage (41.4) and free throw percentage (78.1). In his new role, his assist average dropped to 5.7 per game, near the level he posted while playing alongside LeBron James with the Lakers. New Orleans had power forward Zion Williamson initiate plays off the dribble and handle the ball in transition. Ball became a restricted free agent during the offseason.

=== Chicago Bulls (2021–2025) ===
On August 8, 2021, Ball was traded to the Chicago Bulls in a sign-and-trade deal, with the Pelicans receiving Tomáš Satoranský, Garrett Temple and draft picks. He signed a four-year, $85 million contract extension with the Bulls. On October 20, Ball made his Bulls debut, putting up 12 points, six rebounds, and four assists in a 94–88 win over the Detroit Pistons. On October 22, he put up a triple-double with 17 points, 10 rebounds, and 10 assists in a 128–112 win over the New Orleans Pelicans. On January 20, 2022, after missing three games with a meniscus tear, the Bulls announced that Ball would undergo surgery on his left knee and miss six to eight weeks. On April 6, he was ruled out for the remainder of the season after experiencing pain during rehabilitation when his physical activity was increased. He played in 35 games, the fewest in his career. At the time of his injury, Chicago was 27-13, the best record in the Eastern Conference. Ball was having the best shooting season of his career with career highs in field goal percentage (42%) and 3-point percentage (42%). That season, he was the only NBA player to average five rebounds and five assists and shoot over 40% on 3s.

Ahead of the 2022–23 season, Ball underwent arthroscopic debridement, a surgical treatment that extracts any loose material that may be in the knee joint and can smooth the surfaces inside the knee. On February 21, 2023, the Bulls announced that he would be out for the remainder of the season due to recurring discomfort during participation in basketball activities. Ball did not appear at all in that season. He underwent a cartilage transplant in his left knee on March 16, 2023. In June 2023, Bulls vice president Arturas Karnisovas said that the team does not expect him to be able to play in the 2023–24 season. In December, Chicago head coach Billy Donovan said that Ball was expected to start running in January 2024. In May 2024, Ball revealed that he also received a meniscus transplant for his knee.

In July 2024, Ball was cleared to participate in full-contact five-on-five scrimmages. In August, he began participating in scrimmages and experienced no setbacks. On October 16, Ball played for the first time since January 14, 2022, in a preseason game against the Minnesota Timberwolves. On October 23, Ball made his regular season return in the Bulls' season-opening game, putting up five points, two rebounds, and four assists in 14 minutes played in a 123–111 loss to the New Orleans Pelicans. On January 12, 2025, he made his first start in nearly three years scoring 15 points and three assists in a 124–119 loss to the Sacramento Kings. Two weeks later, on January 27, he put up a season-high 18 points in a 129–121 win over the Denver Nuggets. On February 5, Ball and the Bulls agreed to a two-year, $20 million contract extension. He made 35 total appearances (including 14 starts) for Chicago, averaging 7.6 points, 3.4 rebounds, and 3.3 assists.

=== Cleveland Cavaliers (2025–2026) ===
On July 6, 2025, Ball was traded to the Cleveland Cavaliers in exchange for Isaac Okoro. He made 35 appearances (including three starts) for the Cavaliers during the 2025–26 season, recording averages of 4.6 points, 4.0 rebounds, and 3.9 assists.

On February 5, 2026, Ball was traded to the Utah Jazz but was waived the same day.

== Career statistics ==
Legend
GP	Games played	GS	Games started	MPG	Minutes per game
FG%	Field goal percentage	3P%	3-point field goal percentage	FT%	Free throw percentage
RPG	Rebounds per game	APG	Assists per game	SPG	Steals per game
BPG	Blocks per game	PPG	Points per game	**Bold**	Career high

=== NBA ===
Year	Team	GP	GS	MPG	FG%	3P%	FT%	RPG	APG	SPG	BPG	PPG
2017–18	L.A. Lakers	52	50	34.2	.360	.305	.451	**6.9**	**7.2**	1.7	.8	10.2
2018–19	L.A. Lakers	47	45	30.3	.406	.329	.417	5.3	5.4	1.5	.4	9.9
2019–20	New Orleans	**63**	54	32.1	.403	.375	.566	6.1	7.0	1.4	.6	11.8
2020–21	New Orleans	55	**55**	31.8	.414	.378	.781	4.8	5.7	1.5	.6	**14.6**
2021–22	Chicago	35	35	**34.6**	**.423**	**.423**	.750	5.4	5.1	**1.8**	**.9**	13.0
2024–25	Chicago	35	14	22.2	.366	.344	**.815**	3.4	3.3	1.3	.5	7.6
2025–26	Cleveland	35	3	20.8	.301	.272	.667	4.0	3.9	1.3	.3	4.6
Career		322	256	30.1	.392	.355	.603	5.3	5.6	1.5	.6	10.6

=== College ===
Year	Team	GP	GS	MPG	FG%	3P%	FT%	RPG	APG	SPG	BPG	PPG
2016–17	UCLA	36	36	35.1	.551	.412	.673	6.0	7.6	1.8	.8	14.6

== Player profile ==
Ball proved to be a do-it-all guard who demonstrated above-average skills in nearly every statistical category throughout different points in his career. He was offensively well-rounded, accumulating 8 career triple-doubles, while also being an exceptional perimeter defender. Despite this, he is considered by many to have underachieved the expectations held for him as a second-overall draft pick.

Ball began his career with an unorthodox jump shot characterized by moving the ball from his left hip to the left side of his forehead while rotating his right elbow in toward his chest until it reached a 45-degree angle when shooting the ball. With this form, he averaged a mere 32% from three-point range in his two seasons with the Lakers. Prior to the 2020–21 NBA season, he began adopting a new and more conventional shot form with the ball squared up to his forehead. He jumped up to 38% shooting from three-point range in his two seasons with the Pelicans, and over 42% in his first season with the Bulls prior to his injuries.

Ball began shooting in games from 40 feet (12 m) deep when he was a pre-teen. In college, he shot three-pointers from beyond the NBA line, which is 4 feet (1.2 m) longer than the 19-foot-9-inch (6.02 m) college line. His go-to shot with time expiring was a step-back three-pointer from deep, and he favored shooting jump shots while moving toward his left.

== Awards and honors ==
NBA

- 2× Rising Stars Challenge (2018, 2019)
- NBA All-Rookie Second Team (2018)

College

- Associated Press first-team All-American (2017)
- USBWA first-team All-American (2017)
- NABC first-team All-American (2017)
- Sporting News first-team All-American (2017)
- First-team All-Pac-12 (2017)
- Wayman Tisdale Award (2017)
- Pac-12 Freshman of the Year (2017)
- Pac-12 All-Freshman team (2017)
- Honorable mention Pac-12 All-Defensive Team

High school

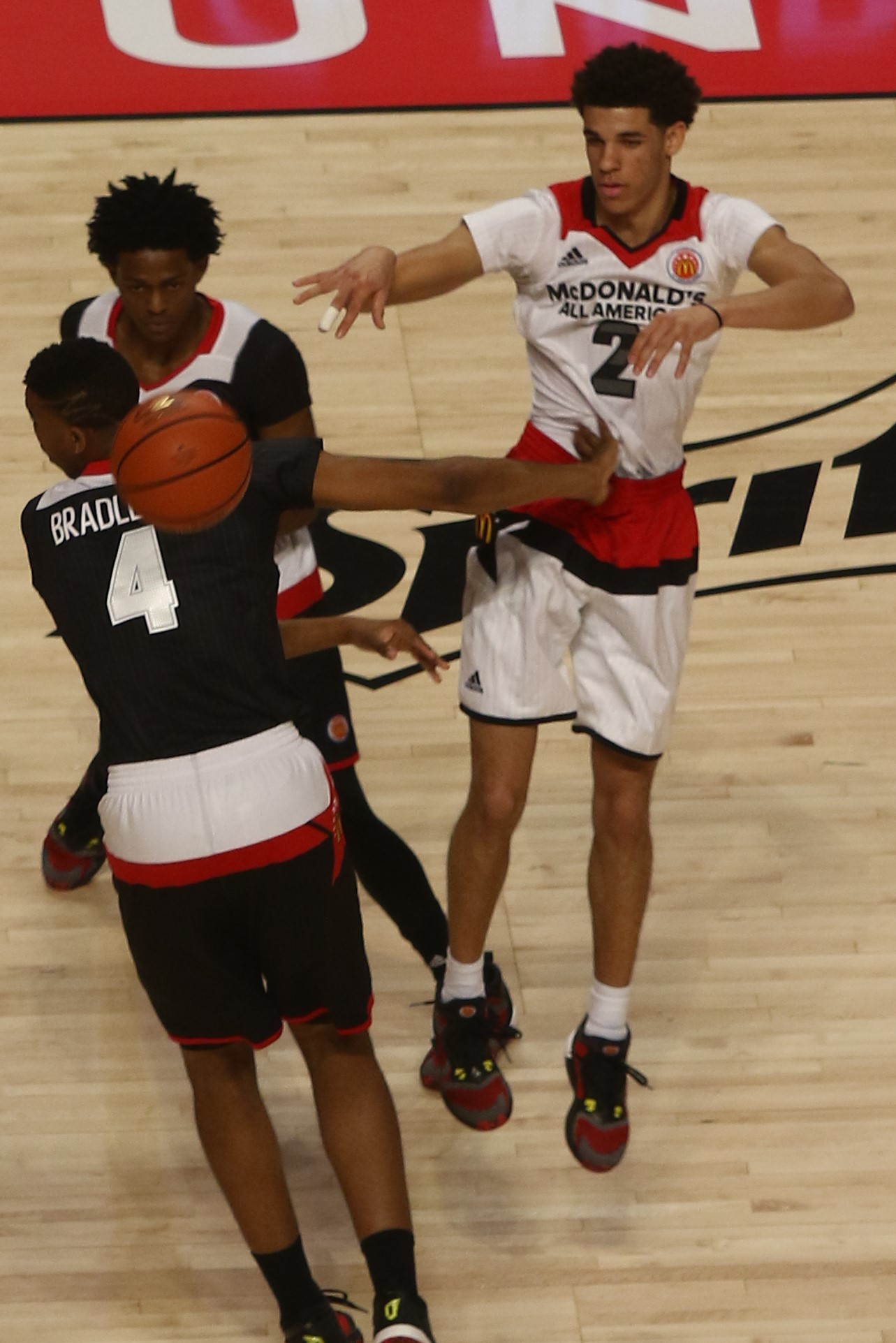
Ball making a pass at the 2016 McDonald's All-American Boys Game

- Naismith Prep Player of the Year (2016)
- Morgan Wootten National Player of the Year (2016)
- USA Today Player of the Year (2016)
- Mr. Basketball USA (2016)
- McDonald's All-American (2016)
- Ballislife All-American (2016)
- Ballislife All-American Game MVP (2016)
- California Mr. Basketball (2016)
- Los Angeles Times Player of the Year (2016)

== Endorsements ==
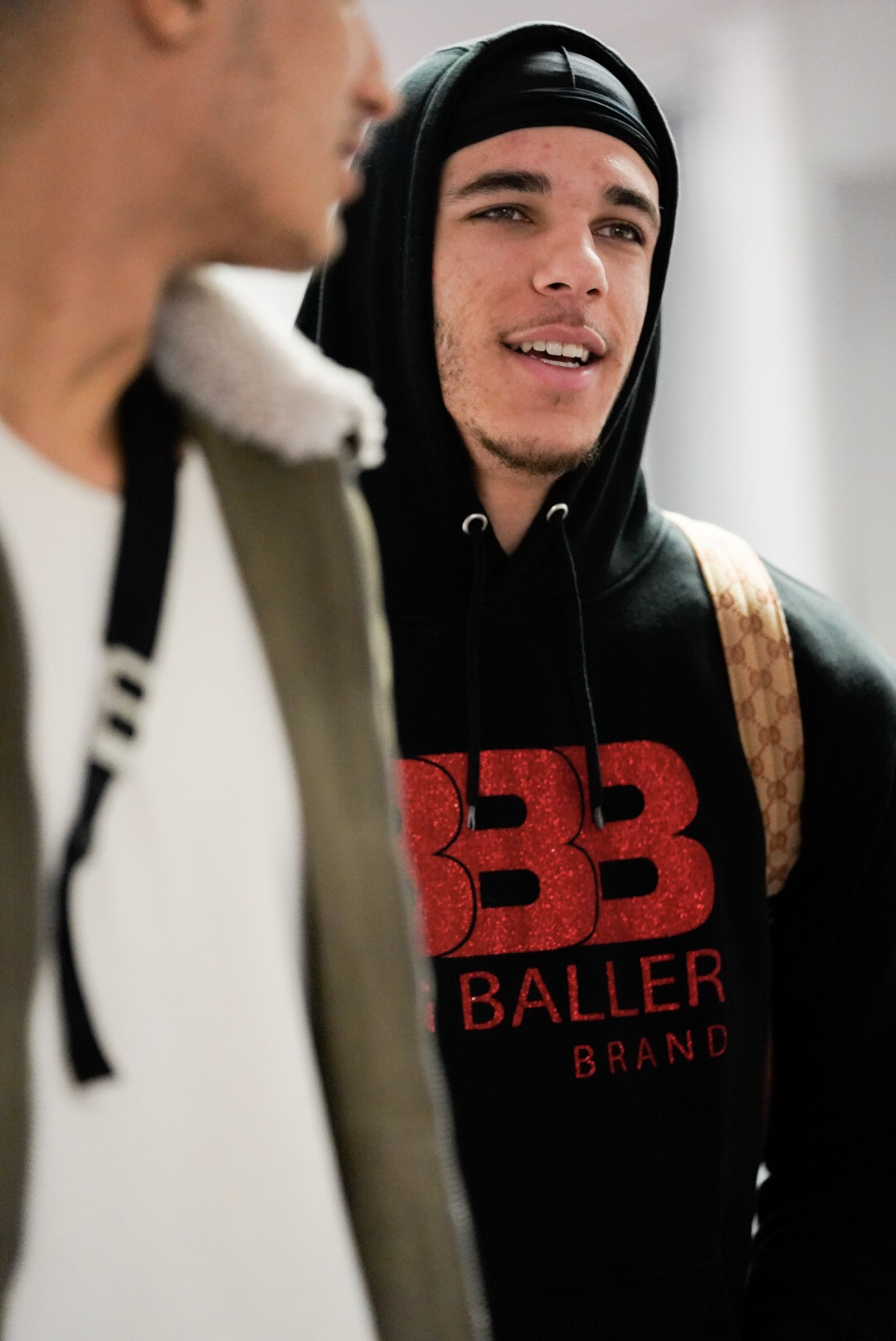
Ball began his pro career using his family's Big Baller Brand gear. Seen here with Kyle Kuzma.

Ball began his pro career using sports apparel from his father LaVar's Big Baller Brand instead of signing with any of the major apparel companies. His father had insisted that he not sign with a company unless they agreed to license merchandise from Big Baller Brand. In May 2017, Big Baller Brand announced the release of Ball's first shoe, the ZO2. The $495 price tag on the shoe sparked wide criticism from celebrities and on social media, in regard to its potential quality in comparison to competing brands such as Nike and Adidas as well as Ball's lack of star power. In response to his critics, LaVar tweeted on May 4, "If you can't afford the ZO2S, you're NOT a BIG BALLER!" It was later revealed that despite not being a founder of the company, Lonzo owned 51% of the Big Baller Brand, while his father owned 16.4% of the business and both his mother and Alan Foster, co-founder of Big Baller Brand, owned 16.3% of the business. On April 6, 2018, Jordan Crawford became the first player besides Ball to wear the ZO2s during a game.

On December 20, 2017, Ball was announced as the logo for the Junior Basketball Association (JBA), a league his father LaVar planned to establish for high-school basketball players who have finished high school but want an alternative option to the NCAA. The logo of the JBA is an outline of Ball.

In March 2019, Ball told ESPN that he had cut his ties with BBB's manager and co-founder Alan Foster, accusing him of enriching himself through Ball's business and personal finances. In particular, he stated that $1.5 million of his personal money had gone missing. In addition, the Lakers showed concerns for the quality of BBB's shoes – believing it was a potential factor in his ankle injuries. Shortly afterward, Ball stripped references to BBB from his social media pages, changed his avatar to a childhood photo of himself wearing a Nike-branded T-shirt, permanently covered up his BBB tattoo, and posted a photograph of himself on Instagram with the caption "Moving on to bigger and better #MyOwnMan" [sic]. Ball and his family have also mentioned the idea of folding the Big Baller Brand altogether in the aftermath of Alan Foster's firing.

== Music career ==
Ball is a rap music enthusiast; in his spare time he writes lyrics on his phone. He has frequently gone to a studio to record music. He has said that he would be a rapper if he was not an NBA player.

In September 2017, Ball released his first rap single, "Melo Ball 1", an ode to his youngest brother, LaMelo. During that same month, he released the song "ZO2", a dedication to his own brand of shoes. The following month, Ball released another rap single titled "Super Saiyan", which is a nod to the anime and manga series Dragon Ball Z. In the track, he compares himself to Goku, the main protagonist of DBZ. On February 15, 2018, Ball and his father would participate in the Lip Sync Battle as competitors. That same day, Ball released his debut album, Born 2 Ball, under the name Zo. The album would be released under the Big Baller Music Group, a subsidiary of the Big Baller Brand, run by a close friend of his father. In March, Born 2 Ball peaked at No. 42 on Billboard's Independent Albums chart and No. 13 on its Heatseekers Albums chart.

=== Discography ===
==== Albums ====
- 2018: Born 2 Ball
- 2020: BBA (Bounce Back Album)

==== Singles ====
- 2017: "Melo Ball 1"
- 2017: "ZO2"
- 2017: "Super Saiyan"

== Television appearances ==
In 2020, Ball competed on the fourth season of The Masked Singer as "Whatchamacallit". He was eliminated on Week 8 alongside Dr. Elvis Francois as "Serpent".

== Personal life ==
In February 2017, Ball's mother, Tina, suffered a stroke and was hospitalized for two months. In August, he and his family premiered in their own Facebook Watch reality show, Ball in the Family.

Ball was in an on-and-off long-term relationship with Denise García, with whom he has a daughter.
