= LiAngelo Ball =

American rapper (born 1998)

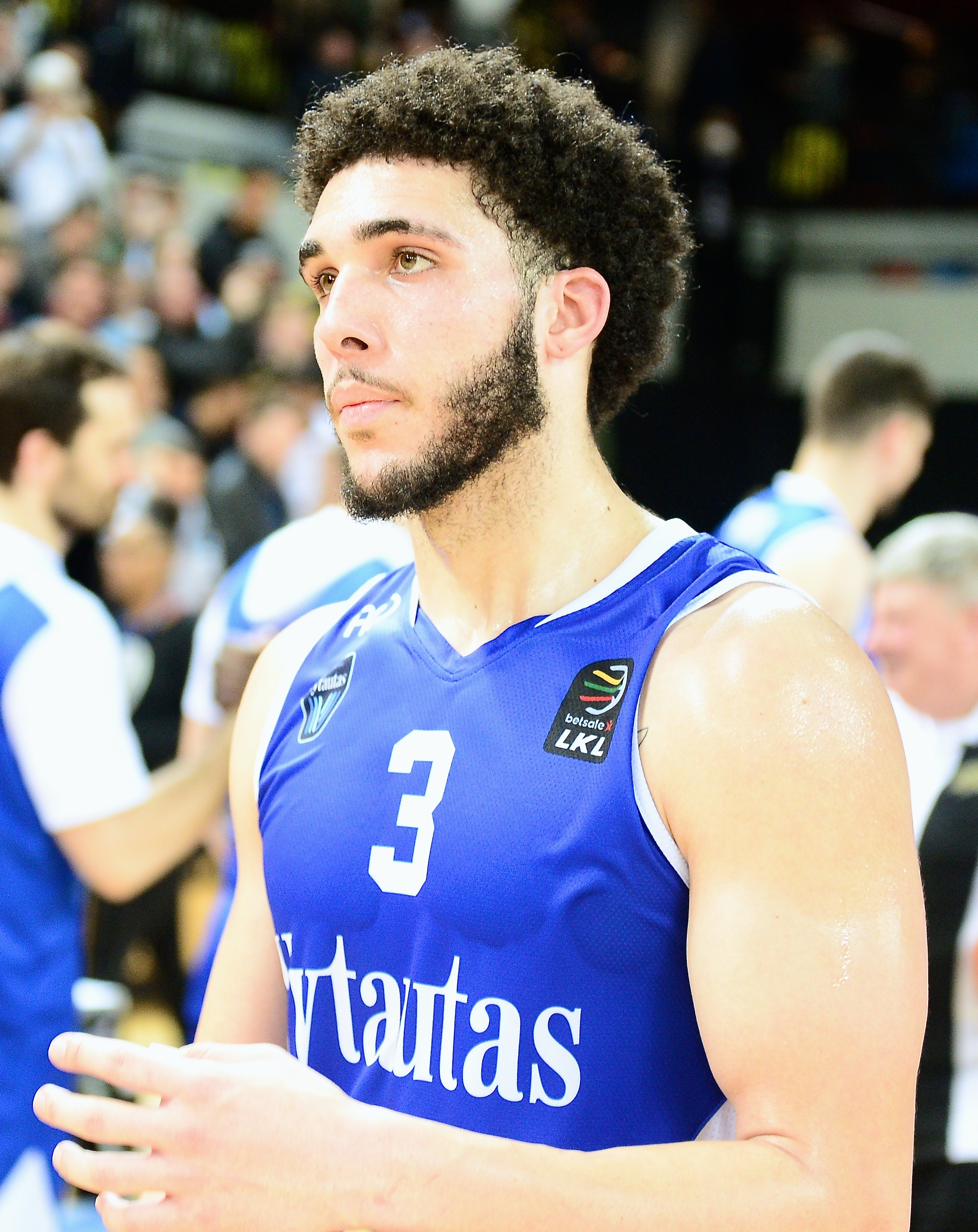
- Ball with Prienai in 2018

Personal information
- Born: November 24, 1998 (age 27) Anaheim, California, U.S.
- Listed height: 6 ft 5 in (1.96 m)
- Listed weight: 230 lb (104 kg)

Career information
- High school: Chino Hills (Chino Hills, California)
- NBA draft: 2018: undrafted
- Playing career: 2018–2025
- Position: Shooting guard / small forward

Career history
- 2018: Vytautas Prienai
- 2018: Los Angeles Ballers
- 2021–2023: Greensboro Swarm
- 2024: Astros de Jalisco
- Stats at NBA.com
- Stats at Basketball Reference

LiAngelo Robert "Gelo" Ball (born November 24, 1998) is an American rapper and former professional basketball player. He is the second son of Big Baller Brand founder LaVar Ball and brother to NBA guards Lonzo and LaMelo Ball.

While a junior at Chino Hills High School in Chino Hills, California, Ball won a state championship alongside his brothers – all three achieved celebrity status through their family's Facebook Watch reality show Ball in the Family. Having become a three-star recruit and UCLA signee, a 2017 suspension for shoplifting led him to forgo college basketball. Instead, he joined Lithuanian professional team Prienai alongside LaMelo and played in the Junior Basketball Association (JBA), a league founded by his father, before entering the NBA G League at the end of the 2019–20 season.

Ball was briefly on the Detroit Pistons roster in late 2020, but was waived prior to the start of the 2020–21 season. He then signed for the Greensboro Swarm, the satellite team of LaMelo's Charlotte Hornets, in 2021 – another hiatus and a brief tenure on CIBACOPA side Astros de Jalisco followed. Afterwards, Ball ventured into hip hop music with the stage name GELO, releasing his debut single "Tweaker" in 2025 that charted in several countries, and then agreeing to a multi-million dollar record deal with Def Jam. He confirmed his full retirement from basketball in August 2025.

== Early life ==
Ball is the second son of LaVar Ball and Tina Ball (née Slatinsky), who are both former college basketball players. The 6 feet 5 inches (1.96 m) tall LaVar played for Washington State and Cal State Los Angeles, while Tina, who stands 6 feet 2 inches (1.88 m), also played with the latter school. His father later played professional football as a tight end for the London Monarchs of the World League of American Football.

In his childhood, Ball often played basketball against older opponents, facing teams of fourth- and fifth-graders while in kindergarten. He started working out and training by age four and first competed with both of his brothers, Lonzo and LaMelo, at age six. As a seven-year-old, he also began playing flag football with his brothers. While Lonzo was a quarterback, LiAngelo and LaMelo caught passes. On the basketball court, LiAngelo grew up playing with his brothers on Big Ballers VXT, an Amateur Athletic Union (AAU) under-17 team created by their father and coached by both parents.

== High school career ==
=== Freshman and sophomore seasons ===
Ball played basketball for four years at Chino Hills High School in his hometown Chino Hills, California. As a freshman, he started alongside his older brother, Lonzo. Ball helped Chino Hills reach its first-ever CIF Southern Section Open Division championship game. Chino Hills fell in overtime to Centennial High School at the Southern California Regional Division I final. As a sophomore, Ball was teammates with his brother, Lonzo, and his cousin, Andre Ball. He suffered a foot injury before the season and missed a tournament at Fairfax High School in June 2014. On September 14, he scored 35 points with seven three-point field goals to win the Ron Massey Memorial Fall Hoops Classic. In December 2014, Ball scored 53 points in a 111–80 win over Dorsey High School. At the end of the season, Ball was sidelined for four games with an ankle sprain but returned for the playoffs. His team lost at the CIF State Division I championship game. After the season, on April 21, he verbally committed to play college basketball for UCLA.

=== Junior season ===
In his junior season, Ball played with both Lonzo and LaMelo. In December 2015, Ball scored 32 points to upset top-ranked Montverde Academy in the City of Palms Classic quarterfinals. He scored 40 points in a semifinal win over High Point Christian Academy and won the tournament. Against Jonesboro High School at the MaxPreps Holiday Classic, Ball scored 41 points. On February 11, he led all scorers with 32 points against Etiwanda High School, as Chino Hills finished the regular season with a 27–0 record. On March 5, 2016, he scored 31 points to win the CIF Southern Section Open Division title over Sierra Canyon School. On March 26, he had 18 points to win the Open Division title over De La Salle High School. As a junior, Ball averaged 27.4 points per game, which led his team. His team finished 35–0 and was named mythical national champion by MaxPreps, who also labeled their title run "perhaps the best brother act in high school basketball history."

=== Senior season ===
On November 29, Ball scored 56 points in a 121–89 win over Lutheran High School of Orange County. In his following game, which was played on the next day, Ball scored a career-high 72 points with 13 three-pointers in a 128–108 victory over Rancho Christian School, the tenth-most points scored in a single game in California high school history. On December 26, he scored 65 points in a Rancho Mirage Holiday Invitational win over Foothill High School. On January 20, 2017, Ball scored 60 points in a 136–93 win over Los Osos High School. Seven days later, he registered 52 points and 10 three-pointers in a victory against Damien High School. His team fell in the CIF Southern Section Open Division semifinals to Bishop Montgomery High School. After a 30–3 season, he was named All-Area Player of the Year by The San Bernardino Sun and Inland Valley Daily Bulletin. Ball was also a first-team All-State and honorable mention All-American selection by MaxPreps. In addition, he averaged 33.8 points per game as a senior, leading the state of California in scoring.

College recruiting
Name	Hometown	School	Height	Weight	Commit date
LiAngelo Ball; SG	Chino Hills, CA	Chino Hills (CA)	6 ft 5.3 in (1.96 m)	220 lb (100 kg)	Apr 21, 2015
LiAngelo Ball; SG	Recruit ratings: Rivals: 247Sports: ESPN: (79)				
Overall recruit ranking: 247Sports: 226
Note: In many cases, Scout, Rivals, 247Sports, On3, and ESPN may conflict in their listings of height and weight.; In these cases, the average was taken. ESPN grades are on a 100-point scale.; Sources: "UCLA 2017 Basketball Commitments". Rivals.; "ESPN". ESPN.; "2017 Team Ranking". Rivals.

== College career ==
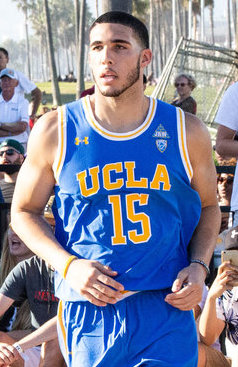
Ball practicing with UCLA at Venice Beach in 2017

Ball was a consensus three-star recruit. 247Sports.com ranked him outside of their top-200 recruits nationally and as the 50th-best shooting guard in his class. Having already committed to play for the UCLA Bruins as a high school sophomore, Ball signed a letter of intent on November 2, 2016, and enrolled at the University of California, Los Angeles on June 1, 2017. He was projected to be a reserve for during his 2017–18 freshman season for UCLA. He played his only game with the Bruins in the preseason on November 1, 2017, against NCAA Division II team Cal State Los Angeles, scoring 11 points.

On November 7, 2017, days before UCLA's regular season opener against Georgia Tech overseas in Shanghai, Ball and two other freshman teammates were arrested in Hangzhou for allegedly stealing sunglasses from a Louis Vuitton store at a high-end shopping center near their team hotel. The trio potentially faced a fine and three to ten years in prison but were soon released from custody; Ball and his teammates thanked President Donald Trump for helping secure their release. Ball was suspended indefinitely from the UCLA basketball program following the incident.

On December 4, he announced that he planned to withdraw from UCLA; his father LaVar had grown frustrated over the length of the suspension. Had Ball stayed at UCLA, he would have remained suspended for the rest of the season.

== Professional career ==
=== Vytautas Prienai (2018) ===
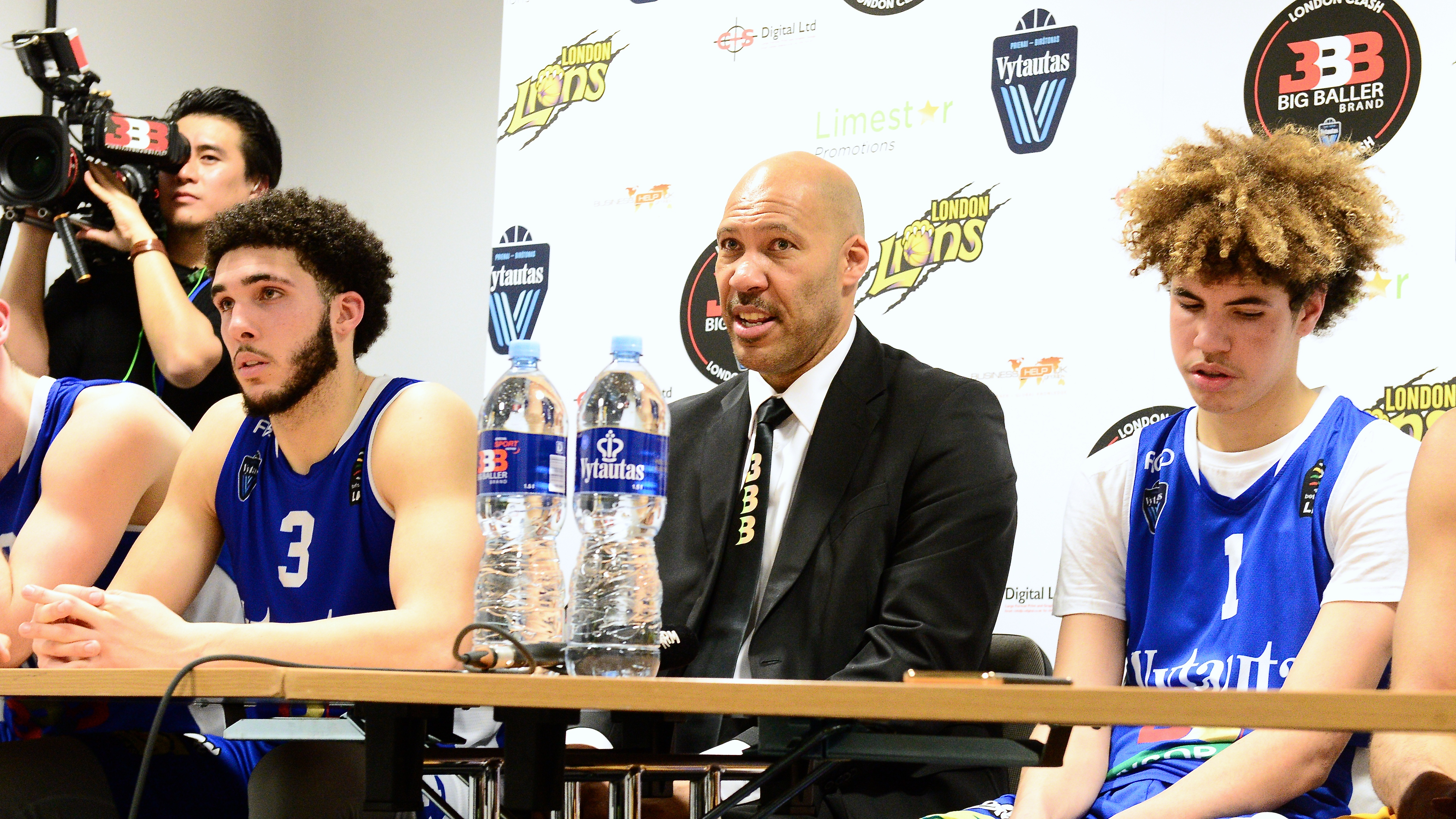
Ball (left) with his father LaVar and brother LaMelo after an exhibition game against the London Lions in 2018

Although Ball was not considered an NBA prospect at the time, he planned on preparing for the 2018 draft with his father after leaving UCLA. On December 11, 2017, he signed with Vytautas Prienai of the Lithuanian Basketball League (LKL), along with his younger brother LaMelo, who left Chino Hills before his junior season. The brothers' move to Lithuania was heavily reported by American sports media. Prienai withdrew from the Baltic Basketball League upon their arrival and took part in various exhibition games sponsored by his family's sports apparel company, Big Baller Brand.

In his professional debut on January 13, 2018, Ball went scoreless in a 95–86 loss to Lietkabelis. On February 11, he made his first start, recording 13 points in a 97–95 victory over Šiauliai. On March 25, Ball scored a season-high 28 points with six three-pointers in a loss to Nevėžis. On March 27, 2018, he announced that he would enter the 2018 NBA draft, even though most analysts believed that he was a long shot to be selected. On April 19, Ball injured his ankle and left early versus Juventus Utena. On April 25, Ball left Vytautas Prienai with his family, with their father being critical of head coach Virginijus Šeškus. He finished the LKL season averaging 12.6 points and 2.7 rebounds per game, shooting 41.5% from the three-point line. Ball was not selected at the 2018 NBA draft.

=== Los Angeles Ballers (2018) ===
On July 9, 2018, Ball signed with the Los Angeles Ballers of the Junior Basketball Association, a league founded by his father as an alternative to college basketball. He joined in the middle of the season and made his debut on July 14, tallying 53 points, 10 rebounds, and 10 assists. Ball was named to the West roster for the JBA All-Star Game and was named co-MVP of the game after scoring 39 points. Ball recorded 39 points, 15 rebounds, 7 assists, and 3 steals in a 202–189 win to claim the All-Star Game MVP award. In his first playoff game, he scored a season-high 58 points in a 157–134 win over the Philadelphia Ballers. On August 12, Ball matched his season high of 58 points, 11 rebounds, and 6 assists in a Finals victory over the Seattle Ballers and was subsequently named Finals MVP. At the end of the season, Ball was among 14 players in the league named to the JBA USA select Team, which faced several European teams on an international tour.

=== Greensboro Swarm (2021–2023) ===
In July 2019, Ball underwent surgery for an ankle injury and missed the NBA Summer League. On December 29, he signed with the Oklahoma City Blue of the NBA G League as a practice player. On March 9, 2020, he signed with the Blue by waiver claim. The Blue played just one game, which Ball did not play in, before the remainder of the season was cancelled due to the COVID-19 pandemic.

On December 2, 2020, Ball was signed to a training camp contract by the Detroit Pistons. On December 13, he was waived without playing in a pre-season game.

In the summer of 2021, Ball was invited by his brother LaMelo to work out with his team, the Charlotte Hornets. The Hornets allowed their players to bring in one workout partner. The Charlotte staff was impressed observing Ball, and he earned a spot on their Summer League team. In his summer league debut, he had five three-pointers in 16 minutes. On October 14, 2021, Ball was signed by the Hornets. However, he was waived the next day.

On October 23, 2021, Ball was selected by the Greensboro Swarm 14th overall in the 2021 NBA G League draft. He scored 22 points in his G League debut.

Ball joined the Charlotte Hornets for the 2022 NBA Summer League. On September 26, 2022, Ball signed a non-guaranteed contract with the Hornets. He was waived on October 15, 2022.

On October 23, 2022, Ball rejoined the Greensboro Swarm roster for training camp.

=== Astros de Jalisco (2024) ===
On February 14, 2024, it was announced that Ball had signed with the Astros de Jalisco of the Circuito de Baloncesto de la Costa del Pacífico (CIBACOPA) in Mexico. He made his team debut in their season opener on March 1, recording no stats in six minutes of play in a 77–72 win against the Frayles de Guasave. After playing only two games, Ball left the team due to a ligament injury in his left ankle, choosing to rehabilitate in the United States.

=== Retirement (2025) ===
On August 6, 2025, Ball confirmed his retirement from basketball, shifting his focus to music following the success of his single, "Tweaker".

== Career statistics ==
Legend
GP	Games played	GS	Games started	MPG	Minutes per game
FG%	Field goal percentage	3P%	3-point field goal percentage	FT%	Free throw percentage
RPG	Rebounds per game	APG	Assists per game	SPG	Steals per game
BPG	Blocks per game	PPG	Points per game	**Bold**	Career high

=== NBA G League ===
==== Showcase Cup ====
Year	Team	GP	GS	MPG	FG%	3P%	FT%	RPG	APG	SPG	BPG	PPG
2021–22	Greensboro	8	0	14.0	**.622**	**.536**	**.500**	**2.3**	.6	.4	.0	**9.1**
2022–23	Greensboro	**11**	**2**	**19.0**	.390	.375	**.500**	1.3	**.9**	**.7**	**.1**	5.7
Career		19	2	16.9	.490	.441	.500	1.7	.8	.6	.1	7.2

==== Regular season ====
Year	Team	GP	GS	MPG	FG%	3P%	FT%	RPG	APG	SPG	BPG	PPG
2021–22	Greensboro	**28**	**6**	**13.2**	**.395**	**.357**	**.667**	**1.1**	**.3**	**.4**	**.1**	**4.6**
2022–23	Greensboro	3	0	11.7	.250	.111	.000	1.0	.0	.3	.0	2.3
Career		31	6	13.1	.382	.333	.500	1.1	.2	.4	.1	4.4

=== LKL ===
Year	Team	GP	GS	MPG	FG%	3P%	FT%	RPG	APG	SPG	BPG	PPG
2017–18	Prienai	14	6	21.6	.425	.415	.633	2.9	0.9	.6	.1	12.6

=== CIBACOPA ===
Year	Team	GP	GS	MPG	FG%	3P%	FT%	RPG	APG	SPG	BPG	PPG
2024	Astros	2	0	9.5	.111	.000	1.000	0.0	0.5	.0	.0	2.0

=== JBA ===
Regular season

Year	Team	GP	GS	MPG	FG%	3P%	FT%	RPG	APG	SPG	BPG	PPG
2018	Los Angeles	4	4	47.3	.444	.250	.667	12.0	6.5	2.3	1.3	51.8
All-Star		1	1	41.3	.529	.214	.000	15.0	7.0	3.0	0.0	39.0

Playoffs

Year	Team	GP	GS	MPG	FG%	3P%	FT%	RPG	APG	SPG	BPG	PPG
2018	Los Angeles	3	3	40.0	.442	.400	.762	8.7	3.0	2.0	.3	47.3

== Music career ==
On January 3, 2025, Ball released his debut single "Tweaker" to viral success, initially previewed on a livestream with internet personality N3on. The remix of the song featuring vocals from Lil Wayne was released on February 7, 2025. Writer Alphonse Pierre of Pitchfork pegs the track as inspired by 2000s Louisiana hip-hop, stating Ball "is putting out music that sounds like he wants to convince us he grew up crooning on the porches of Baton Rouge with Boosie and Webbie." The song debuted at No. 29 on the Billboard Hot 100.

On January 13, 2025, NBA insider Shams Charania of ESPN reported that Ball signed a record deal with Def Jam Recordings worth up to $13 million with a guaranteed $8 million.

In February, he previewed "Law n Order" and "Can You Please" on PlaqueBoyMax's livestream; the latter was previously teased by Ball's brother, Lonzo.

On July 18, 2025, he released his debut studio album under Def Jam, League of My Own.

On November 17, 2025, it was announced that his debut single "Tweaker" had reached certified platinum status by the Recording Industry Association of America, having sold one million copies in digital units.

== Discography ==
=== Studio albums ===
Title	Album details
League of My Own	Released: July 18, 2025; Label: Def Jam; Formats: Digital download, streaming

=== Singles ===
Title	Year	Peak chart positions							Certifications	Album
Title	Year	US	US R&B /HH	AUS	CAN	IRE	NZ	WW	Certifications	Album
"Tweaker" (solo or featuring Lil Wayne)	2025	29	7	41	27	79	14	56	RIAA: Platinum	League of My Own
"Can You Please" (featuring GloRilla)	2025	— (Note: "Can You Please" did not enter the Billboard Hot 100 but peaked at number 12 on the Bubbling Under Hot 100 chart.)	37	—	—	—	— (Note: "Can You Please" did not enter the NZ Top 40 Singles Chart, but peaked at number 10 on the NZ Hot Singles Chart.)	—		League of My Own
"Law n Order"	2025	—	—	—	—	—	—	—		League of My Own
"Booted Up"	2025	—	—	—	—	—	—	—		League of My Own
"Backyard Ball"	2026	—	—	—	—	—	—	—		

== Personal life ==
Ball's older brother, Lonzo, was a point guard for the Cleveland Cavaliers and was the second overall pick in the 2017 draft, while his younger brother LaMelo is a point guard for the Minnesota Timberwolves and was drafted third overall in the 2020 draft. His cousin, Andre Ball, played college basketball for Pepperdine.

In April 2023, Ball and reality television personality Nikki Mudarris announced they were expecting a child. Their son, LaVelo Anthony Ball, was born on July 19, 2023. The following year, the couple welcomed a baby girl, LaNiyah Nicole Ball, who was born on December 3, 2024. On February 8, 2025, after accusing Ball of ghosting and cheating on her, while abandoning their children, Mudarris confirmed the pair had broken up after a three-year relationship. A few weeks later, he married social media personality Rashida Nicole, with whom he has one child, Lilo Ball. He filed for divorce later that year shortly after the birth of his third child.
