= Jaylen Hands =

American basketball player (born 1999)

- Hands with SIG Strasbourg in 2026

No. 50 – SIG Strasbourg
- Position: Shooting guard / point guard
- League: LNB Élite

Personal information
- Born: February 12, 1999 (age 27) San Diego, California, U.S.
- Listed height: 6 ft 3 in (1.91 m)
- Listed weight: 190 lb (86 kg)

Career information
- High school: Mater Dei Catholic (Chula Vista, California); Balboa City School (San Diego, California); Foothills Christian (El Cajon, California)
- College: UCLA (2017–2019)
- NBA draft: 2019: 2nd round, 56th overall pick
- Drafted by: Los Angeles Clippers
- Playing career: 2019–present

Career history
- 2019–2020: Long Island Nets
- 2021: FMP
- 2021: Riesen Ludwigsburg
- 2021–2022: Telenet Giants Antwerp
- 2022–2023: PAOK Thessaloniki
- 2023–2024: Peristeri
- 2024: Palencia
- 2024–2025: Pallacanestro Varese
- 2025: Panionios
- 2026: Nanjing Monkey Kings
- 2026: UCAM Murcia
- 2026–present: SIG Strasbourg

Career highlights
- Lega Basket Serie A Scoring Leader (2025); Second-team All-Pac-12 (2019); McDonald's All-American (2017)
- Stats at Basketball Reference

Jaylen Joseph Hands (born February 12, 1999) is an American professional basketball player for SIG Strasbourg of the LNB Élite. He played college basketball for the UCLA Bruins. He was selected in the second round of the 2019 NBA draft by the Los Angeles Clippers with the 56th pick before being traded to the Brooklyn Nets. He played a season in the NBA G League with Brooklyn's affiliate, the Long Island Nets before beginning his European career in 2021.

As a high school senior in 2017, he was selected to play in the McDonald's All-American Game, and was ranked as a consensus five-star prospect and the No. 3 point guard in the country in the class of 2017 by all major scouting services, including ESPN and 247Sports. Hands earned second-team All-Pac-12 honors in his sophomore year with UCLA in 2019.

== High school career ==
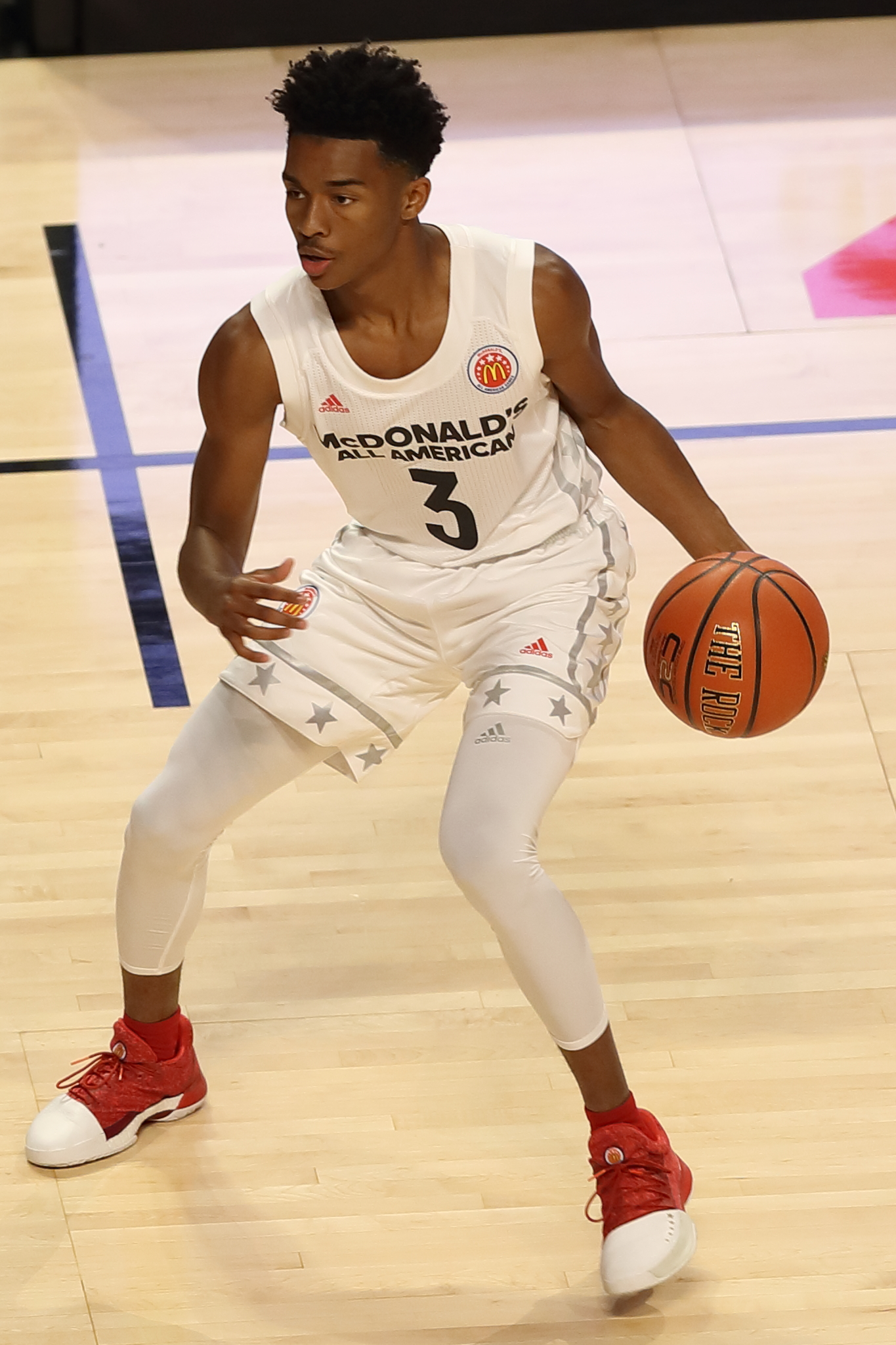
Hands at the 2017 McDonald's All-American Game

Hands began his high school career playing with Mater Dei Catholic High School in Chula Vista, California where he was named an All-County player, San Diego Metro League Player of the Year, and won the 2014 CIF championship. Following his sophomore season, he transferred to Foothills Christian High School in El Cajon, but this transfer was denied by the San Diego Section. Instead, Hands enrolled at Balboa City, a prep school that operated outside of the Section's jurisdiction, where he was teammates with Deandre Ayton, the future top prospect of the class of 2017. For his senior season, he completed his transfer to Foothills Christian, where he played for coach Brad Leaf, father of UCLA star T. J. Leaf. That year, Hands averaged 29 points, 6.7 rebounds and 6.5 assists a game. He also won the slam dunk contest at the Ballislife All-American Game.

Ranked a consensus five-star college recruit, Hands received many offers from teams such as Arizona, Louisville and San Diego State, but eventually committed to UCLA on September 16, 2015.

== College career ==
As a freshman in 2017–18, Hands and junior Aaron Holiday gave the Bruins two fast guards capable of handling the ball, and they were expected to play alongside each other as well as share point guard duties. However, Hands' play was erratic, and he came off the bench for much of the season. He started the first five games of the season before missing a game after spraining his left foot against Wisconsin. Upon returning, he became the sixth man while sophomore Prince Ali remained in the starting lineup. On December 3, 2017, Hands scored a career-high 23 points and added nine rebounds, four assists, two steals and only one turnover in 24 minutes in a 106–73 win over Detroit Mercy. After playing 14 games as a reserve with coach Steve Alford staggering the minutes of his two main ballhandlers, Hands returned to the starting lineup on January 25, 2018, against California, replacing forward GG Goloman. He finished with 14 points, six rebounds and one assist in a 70–57 win over the Golden Bears. In the following game, he scored nine points and had a season-high 10 assists with only one turnover in an 89–73 victory over Stanford. Hands missed the regular season finale after spraining his right ankle in practice. He returned for UCLA's Pac-12 tournament opener, but played just 10 minutes and did not start. He ended the season with averages of 9.9 points in 25.2 minutes, with almost as many turnovers (1.8) as assists (2.6). After the season, Hands declared for the 2018 NBA draft and attended the NBA Draft Combine, but withdrew from the draft to return to the Bruins.

In 2018–19, Hands assumed the lead point guard role with Holiday having left for the NBA. Hands hoped to become a better leader and improve his assist-to-turnover ratio. He and fellow sophomore Kris Wilkes were the team's top two returning scorers. On November 28, 2019, Hands had a career-high 11 assists in an 80–61 win over Hawaii. In the following game, he had his first career double-double with 17 points and 10 assists in an 82–58 win over Loyola Marymount. He followed up with 12 points and a career-high-tying 11 assists for his second straight double-double in a win against Notre Dame. He became the first Bruins player with 10 or more assists in three consecutive games after achieving it only once in his first 37 career games. (Note: UCLA did not regularly record assists until 1973–74.) On February 9, 2019, Hands scored a career-high 27 points against Utah, but the Bruins blew a 22-point lead with 12:10 remaining in the game and lost 93–92 on a three-point field goal at the buzzer. Hands conceded that he committed an intentional foul too early with 6.9 seconds left in the game, helping to set up the Utes' game-winning shot. On February 23, he scored all of his 27 points in the second half, when he was 7-of-8 on 3-pointers to help UCLA rally from a 19-point deficit in the half and win 90–83 versus Oregon. In the following game against USC, he had 21 points and 10 assists with no turnovers in a 93–88 overtime win over their crosstown rivals. He had sat out the first 2:19 of overtime as the Bruins opted for a stronger defensive lineup, but he returned to make a 30-foot (9.1 m) three-pointer with 21 seconds remaining to extend the Bruins' one-point lead and help secure the victory. His performance against the Trojans earned him his first Pac-12 Player of the Week honors. In UCLA's opening game of the Pac-12 tournament, Hands had 22 points and a career-high 11 rebounds in a 79–72 win over 10th-seeded Stanford. He finished the year as the Pac-12 leader in assists (6.1), and was named second-team All-Pac-12. After the season, he announced that he would declare for the NBA draft and hire an agent.

== Professional career ==
=== Long Island Nets (2019–2020) ===
Hands was selected by the Los Angeles Clippers in the second round of the 2019 NBA draft with the 56th overall pick. He was acquired by the Brooklyn Nets along with a 2020 first-round pick in exchange for Mfiondu Kabengele, who was taken earlier with the 27th overall pick. Brooklyn used the draft rights player rule to have Hands sign with their G League affiliate, the Long Island Nets. On December 11, 2019, Hands had 28 points, six rebounds, five assists and three steals in a win over the Westchester Knicks. In his rookie season, Hands averaged 11.3 points, 3.5 assists, 3.0 rebounds and 1.0 steals per game. On November 19, 2020, Hands' NBA draft rights were traded to the Detroit Pistons in a three-team trade; they renounced his draft rights in July 2021.

As of 2026, along with Vanja Marinković, Jaylen Hands remains 1 of 2 players from the 2019 Draft Class to never play a game in the NBA.

=== FMP (2021) ===
On January 1, 2021, Hands signed a two-year contract with Serbian team FMP of the ABA League.

=== Riesen Ludwigsburg (2021) ===
In August 2021, Hands signed with the Cleveland Cavaliers for the NBA Summer League. In September, the Westchester Knicks acquired his G League rights from the Nets for Bryce Brown. On September 22, Hands signed with MHP Riesen Ludwigsburg of the Basketball Bundesliga.

=== Antwerp Giants (2021–2022) ===
On October 11, 2021, Hands signed with Telenet Giants Antwerp of the BNXT League.

=== PAOK Thessaloniki (2022–2023) ===
On July 4, 2022, Hands signed with PAOK Thessaloniki of the Greek Basket League. In 31 domestic league games, he averaged 13.9 points, 3.4 rebounds, 2.6 assists and 1.7 turnovers, playing around 24 minutes per contest.

=== Peristeri Athens (2023–2024) ===
On June 24, 2023, Hands signed with Peristeri Athens of the Greek Basket League and the FIBA Champions League. On February 14, 2024, he parted ways with the club. He was averaging 12 points, 3 rebounds and 1.8 assists per contest, but he also missed part of the season due to injuries.

=== Pallacanestro Varese (2024–2025) ===
On July 9, 2024, Hands signed with Pallacanestro Varese of the Lega Basket Serie A (LBA).

=== Panionios (2025) ===
On July 21. 2025, Hands returned to Greece and joined Panionios of the Greek Basketball League and the EuroCup. On November 24, Hands received a Hoops Agents Player of the Week. He had a double-double of 34 points and 10 rebounds.

=== UCAM Murcia (2026) ===
On April 14, 2026, Hands returned to Spain and joined UCAM Murcia of the Liga ACB, signing until the end of the season.

=== SIG Strasbourg (2026–present) ===
On August 31, 2026, he signed with SIG Strasbourg of the LNB Élite.

== Career statistics ==
Legend
GP	Games played	GS	Games started	MPG	Minutes per game
FG%	Field goal percentage	3P%	3-point field goal percentage	FT%	Free throw percentage
RPG	Rebounds per game	APG	Assists per game	SPG	Steals per game
BPG	Blocks per game	PPG	Points per game	**Bold**	Career high

=== College ===
Year	Team	GP	GS	MPG	FG%	3P%	FT%	RPG	APG	SPG	BPG	PPG
2017–18	UCLA	31	15	25.2	.405	**.374**	.738	**4.0**	2.6	1.0	**.2**	9.9
2018–19	UCLA	**33**	**33**	**31.2**	**.413**	.373	**.780**	3.7	**6.1**	**1.3**	**.2**	**14.2**
Career		64	48	28.3	.409	.373	.762	3.8	4.4	1.2	.2	12.1
