= Kris Wilkes =

American basketball player (born 1998)

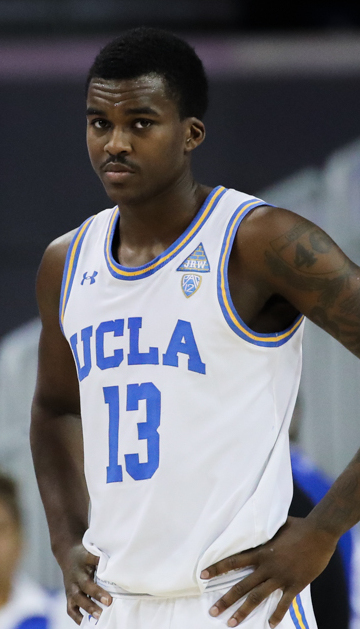
- Wilkes with the UCLA Bruins in 2018

Free agent
- Position: Shooting guard / small forward

Personal information
- Born: September 18, 1998 (age 28) Indianapolis, Indiana, U.S.
- Listed height: 6 ft 8 in (2.03 m)
- Listed weight: 215 lb (98 kg)

Career information
- High school: North Central (Indianapolis, Indiana)
- College: UCLA (2017–2019)
- NBA draft: 2019: undrafted

Career highlights
- Second-team All-Pac-12 (2019); Pac-12 All-Freshman Team (2018); McDonald's All-American (2017); Indiana Mr. Basketball (2017)

Kristafer Aaron Wilkes (born September 18, 1998) is an American former basketball player. As a high school senior, he was a McDonald's All-American and named Indiana Mr. Basketball. He played college basketball for the UCLA Bruins. He was a starter as a freshman in 2017–18, when he was named to the Pac-12 All-Freshman Team. As a sophomore, he earned second-team All-Pac-12 honors in 2019. He went undrafted in the 2019 NBA draft.

== High school career ==
As a high school senior in 2017, he was selected to play in the McDonald's All-American Game and was ranked as a consensus five-star prospect in the class of 2017. At the conclusion of his senior year, Wilkes was named Indiana Mr. Basketball and an Indiana All-Star.

== College career ==
Ranked a consensus five-star college recruit, Wilkes chose to play for UCLA over Indiana and Illinois. The Bruins highest ranked recruit for 2017–18 ahead of guard Jaylen Hands, he started in the season opener and scored a team-high 18 points in a 63–60 win over Georgia Tech. On November 16, 2017, he had 20 points and a team-high 12 rebounds for his first career double-double in a 106–101 overtime win over Central Arkansas. After averaging 16.8 points through the first four games, Wilkes began to struggle. He was limited to single-digit scoring in three of four games before scoring 20 points in an 83–75 upset over No. 7 Kentucky. On December 31, he scored 21 points in a 74–53 win over Washington. On January 20, Wilkes scored another 21 in a 94–91 loss to Oregon. In the rematch against Oregon, he scored 19 points and made a career-high five three-pointers in an 86–78 win in the Bruins' final home game. In the regular-season finale, Wilkes scored a season-high 22 points and teammate Aaron Holiday had a career-high 34 in an 87–72 victory over USC, completing a season sweep in their crosstown rivalry and clinching a bye and the No. 4 seed for UCLA in the upcoming Pac-12 tournament. He was named to the Pac-12 All-Freshman Team.

UCLA qualified for the 2018 NCAA tournament, but lost 65–58 to St. Bonaventure in the First Four. After starting all previous 32 games entering the tournament, Wilkes did not start the game, sitting out the first five minutes for disciplinary reasons after being late for a team bus earlier in the week. He ended the year as UCLA's second-leading scorer and rebounder with averages of 13.7 points and 4.9 rebounds per game. He declared for the 2018 NBA draft and attended the NBA Draft Combine, but later withdrew from the draft to return to the Bruins. There were concerns among NBA executives about his durability given his narrow frame of 6 feet 8 inches (2.03 m) and 195 pounds (88 kg), and he figured to improve his standing with a more prominent role as a sophomore.

In the 2018–19 season opener, Wilkes scored 27 points and added 10 rebounds in a 96–71 win over Purdue Fort Wayne. On December 8, 2018, he made a game-winning three-pointer with 0.9 seconds remaining in a 65–62 win over Notre Dame. On January 26, 2019, he scored a career-high 34 points on 12-of-16 shooting from the field to help UCLA end a three-game losing streak in a 90–69 win over Arizona. On the road against California, Wilkes had 27 points and 10 rebounds to help the Bruins win 75–67 in overtime and end a three-game losing streak. "[Wilkes is] our best player, and that’s the way he's supposed to play", said interim coach Murry Bartow. He finished the season as the Bruins leading scoring (17.4), and was named second-team All-Pac-12. While his scoring increased by almost four points per game from his freshman year, his field goal percentage dropped from 44.1 to 43.3. After the season, which UCLA finished 17–16 and failed to qualify for the NCAA tournament, Wilkes declared again for the NBA draft.

== Professional career ==
After not showing dramatic improvement as a UCLA sophomore, Wilkes went undrafted in the 2019 NBA draft. He was expected to sign a two-way contract with the New York Knicks after general manager Scott Perry talked about him while introducing their 2019 draft picks. However, Wilkes was unable to play in the 2019 NBA Summer League due to a severe, undisclosed illness, and the Knicks signed Ivan Rabb with their remaining two-way slot. Wilkes later described the illness as acute disseminated encephalomyelitis, a rare autoimmune disease.

In 2024, he was invited to work out with the Indiana Pacers. They asked him to participate in their summer training camp, though he was not given an NBA Summer League contract. On October 27, Wilkes joined the Indiana Mad Ants, but was waived on November 6.

== Career statistics ==
Legend
GP	Games played	GS	Games started	MPG	Minutes per game
FG%	Field goal percentage	3P%	3-point field goal percentage	FT%	Free throw percentage
RPG	Rebounds per game	APG	Assists per game	SPG	Steals per game
BPG	Blocks per game	PPG	Points per game	**Bold**	Career high

=== College ===
Year	Team	GP	GS	MPG	FG%	3P%	FT%	RPG	APG	SPG	BPG	PPG
2017–18	UCLA	**33**	32	29.8	**.441**	**.352**	.655	**4.9**	**1.7**	**.8**	**.5**	13.7
2018–19	UCLA	**33**	**33**	**31.7**	.433	.337	**.671**	4.8	**1.7**	.6	.4	**17.4**
Career		66	65	30.8	.436	.343	.664	4.8	1.7	.7	.5	15.5
