= 2017–18 California Golden Bears men's basketball team =

American college basketball season

2017–18 California Golden Bears men's basketball
- Conference: Pac-12 Conference
- Record: 8–24 (2–16 Pac–12)
- Head coach: Wyking Jones (1st season)
- Assistant coaches: Tim O'Toole; Theo Robertson; Chris Walker
- Home arena: Haas Pavilion (Capacity: 11,877)

2017–18 Pac-12 Conference men's basketball standings
| | Conf. | | | | Overall |
| Team | W | | L | PCT | W | | L | PCT |
|---|---|---|---|---|---|---|---|---|
| No. 12 Arizona † | 14 | – | 4 | .778 | 27 | – | 8 | .771 |
| USC | 12 | – | 6 | .667 | 24 | – | 12 | .667 |
| UCLA | 11 | – | 7 | .611 | 21 | – | 12 | .636 |
| Utah | 11 | – | 7 | .611 | 23 | – | 12 | .657 |
| Stanford | 11 | – | 7 | .611 | 19 | – | 16 | .543 |
| Oregon | 10 | – | 8 | .556 | 23 | – | 13 | .639 |
| Washington | 10 | – | 8 | .556 | 21 | – | 13 | .618 |
| Colorado | 8 | – | 10 | .444 | 17 | – | 15 | .531 |
| Arizona State | 8 | – | 10 | .444 | 20 | – | 12 | .625 |
| Oregon State | 7 | – | 11 | .389 | 16 | – | 16 | .500 |
| Washington State | 4 | – | 14 | .222 | 12 | – | 19 | .387 |
| California | 2 | – | 16 | .111 | 8 | – | 24 | .250 |
† Pac-12 Tournament winner Rankings from AP poll

The 2017–18 California Golden Bears men's basketball team represented the University of California, Berkeley in the 2017–18 NCAA Division I men's basketball season. This was Wyking Jones' first year as head coach at California. The Golden Bears played their home games at Haas Pavilion as members of the Pac-12 Conference. They finished the season 8–24, 2–16 in Pac-12 play to finish in last place. They lost in the first round of the Pac-12 tournament to Stanford.

== Previous season ==
The Golden Bears finished the season 21–13, 10–8 in the conference. During the season, they were invited and participated in the Pearl Harbor Basketball Invitational in Honolulu, Hawaii. California defeated Princeton but lost to Seton Hall to earn 2nd place. In the postseason, the Golden Bears defeated Oregon State and Utah in Pac-12 tournament in Paradise, Nevada to advance to the semifinals, where they lost to Oregon. California was invited and participated in the 2017 National Invitation Tournament, where they lost in the first round to Cal State Bakersfield; the Golden Bears hosted the match against the Roadrunners.

== Off-season ==
=== Departures ===
| Name | Pos. | Height | Weight | Year | Hometown | Reason for departure |
|---|---|---|---|---|---|---|
| Stephen Domingo | G | 6'7" | 215 | RS senior | San Francisco, CA | Graduated |
| Grant Mullins | G | 6'3" | 175 | RS senior | Burlington, ON | Graduated |
| Jabari Bird | G | 6'6" | 198 | Senior | Vallejo, CA | Graduated; drafted to the Boston Celtics |
| Roger Moute a Bidias | F | 6'6" | 210 | Senior | Yaoundé, CM | Graduated |
| Sam Singer | G | 6'4" | 205 | Senior | Miami, FL | Graduated |
| Kameron Rooks | C | 7'1" | 265 | RS junior | San Marcos, CA | Will graduate and transfer to San Diego State |
| Brandon Chauca | G | 5'8" | 160 | Junior | Alexandria, VA | Left the team for personal reasons |
| Ivan Rabb | F | 6'10" | 220 | Sophomore | Oakland, CA | Declared for 2017 NBA draft; drafted to the Memphis Grizzlies |
| Charlie Moore | G | 5'11" | 170 | Freshman | Chicago, IL | Elected to transfer to Kansas |

=== Incoming transfers ===
| Name | Pos. | Height | Weight | Year | Hometown | Notes |
|---|---|---|---|---|---|---|
| Paris Austin | G | 6'0" | 175 | Junior | Oakland, CA | Transferred from Boise State. Under NCAA transfer rules, he had to sit out for the 2017–18 season. Had two years of remaining eligibility. |

=== 2017 recruiting class ===
College recruiting
| Name | Hometown | School | Height | Weight | Commit date |
|---|---|---|---|---|---|
| Juhwan Harris-Dyson; SF | Sherman Oaks, California | Heritage HS | 6 ft 5 in (1.96 m) | 180 lb (82 kg) | Jul 13, 2016 |
| Juhwan Harris-Dyson; SF | Recruit ratings: Scout: Rivals: 247Sports: ESPN: (80) | | | | |
| Trevin Knell; SG | Woods Cross, Utah | Woods Cross HS | 6 ft 5 in (1.96 m) | 185 lb (84 kg) | Oct 4, 2016 |
| Trevin Knell; SG | Recruit ratings: Scout: Rivals: 247Sports: ESPN: (77) | | | | |
| Justice Sueing; SF | Santa Ana, California | Mater Dei HS | 6 ft 6 in (1.98 m) | 210 lb (95 kg) | Feb 1, 2017 |
| Justice Sueing; SF | Recruit ratings: Scout: Rivals: 247Sports: ESPN: (82) | | | | |
| Grant Anticevich; PF | Sydney, New South Wales, Australia | Newington HS | 6 ft 8 in (2.03 m) | 210 lb (95 kg) | Mar 1, 2017 |
| Grant Anticevich; PF | Recruit ratings: No ratings found | | | | |
Overall recruit ranking: 247Sports: #48
Note: In many cases, Scout, Rivals, 247Sports, On3, and ESPN may conflict in their listings of height and weight.; In these cases, the average was taken. ESPN grades are on a 100-point scale.; Sources: "2017 California Basketball Commitment List". Rivals.; "2017 California Player Commits". ESPN.; "2017 Team Ranking". Rivals.

School offers by recruit

- Juhwan Harris-Dyson: California & Utah
- Trevin Knell: Air Force, California, Montana, Rice, Robert Morris, San Diego, Santa Clara, Southern Utah, Utah State, Utah Valley, Washington State, Weber State, & Wyoming
- Justice Sueing: California, Hawaii, Saint Mary's, San Francisco, & Utah
- Grant Anticevich: California

== Future recruits ==
=== 2018–19 team recruits ===
College recruiting (2018)
| Name | Hometown | School | Height | Weight | Commit date |
|---|---|---|---|---|---|
| Jacobi Gordon; SF | Houston, TX | Global Learning Village | 6 ft 6 in (1.98 m) | 205 lb (93 kg) | May 31, 2017 |
| Jacobi Gordon; SF | Recruit ratings: Scout: Rivals: 247Sports: ESPN: | | | | |
| Matt Bradley; SF | San Bernardino, CA | Wasatch Academy | 6 ft 4 in (1.93 m) | 190 lb (86 kg) | Jun 1, 2017 |
| Matt Bradley; SF | Recruit ratings: Scout: Rivals: 247Sports: ESPN: | | | | |
| Andre Kelly; PF | Stockton, CA | Lincoln High School | 6 ft 7 in (2.01 m) | 235 lb (107 kg) | Sep 3, 2017 |
| Andre Kelly; PF | Recruit ratings: Scout: Rivals: 247Sports: ESPN: | | | | |
Overall recruit ranking:
Note: In many cases, Scout, Rivals, 247Sports, On3, and ESPN may conflict in their listings of height and weight.; In these cases, the average was taken. ESPN grades are on a 100-point scale.; Sources: "2018 California Commits". Rivals.; "2018 Team Ranking". Rivals.

== Roster ==
2017–18 California Golden Bears men's basketball team
Players
Coaches

| Pos. | # | Name | Height | Weight | Year | Previous school | Hometown |
|---|---|---|---|---|---|---|---|
| G | 0 | Jacob Orender (W) | 6 ft 0 in (1.83 m) | 175 lb (79 kg) | Jr | Lafayette | Jacksonville Beach, Florida |
| G | 1 | Darius McNeill | 6 ft 3 in (1.91 m) | 175 lb (79 kg) | Fr | Westfield HS | Houston, Texas |
| G | 2 | Juhwan Harris-Dyson | 6 ft 5 in (1.96 m) | 198 lb (90 kg) | Fr | Heritage Christian | Northridge, California |
| G | 3 | Paris Austin (I) (redshirt) | 6 ft 0 in (1.83 m) | 185 lb (84 kg) | Jr | Bishop O'Dowd HS/Boise State | Oakland, California |
| F | 10 | Justice Sueing | 6 ft 7 in (2.01 m) | 209 lb (95 kg) | Fr | Mater Dei HS | Honolulu, Hawaii |
| G | 12 | Austin McCullough | 6 ft 4 in (1.93 m) | 197 lb (89 kg) | Fr | Portage Central HS | Portage, Michigan |
| G | 13 | Jules Erving (W) | 6 ft 6 in (1.98 m) | 201 lb (91 kg) | Fr | Holy Innocents' Episcopal School | Atlanta, Georgia |
| G | 14 | Don Coleman | 6 ft 3 in (1.91 m) | 193 lb (88 kg) | Jr | Lawson State C.C. | Augusta, Georgia |
| F | 15 | Roman Davis | 6 ft 7 in (2.01 m) | 204 lb (93 kg) | RS So | Windward HS | Carson, California |
| G | 20 | Derek King (W) | 6 ft 3 in (1.91 m) | 198 lb (90 kg) | Sr | Santa Teresa HS/Foothill College | Shanghai, China |
| G | 21 | Nick Hamilton (W) | 6 ft 3 in (1.91 m) | 201 lb (91 kg) | Sr | Westchester HS | Inglewood, California |
| C | 22 | Kingsley Okoroh | 7 ft 1 in (2.16 m) | 267 lb (121 kg) | Sr | Westwind Prep | Derby, England |
| F | 24 | Marcus Lee | 6 ft 11 in (2.11 m) | 225 lb (102 kg) | RS Sr | Kentucky | Antioch, California |
| G | 25 | Deschon Winston | 6 ft 2 in (1.88 m) | 175 lb (79 kg) | Fr | Birmingham HS | Lake Balboa, California |
| G | 30 | Koko Kurdoghlian (W) | 6 ft 2 in (1.88 m) | 184 lb (83 kg) | So | La Cañada HS | La Cañada, California |
| F | 34 | Grant Anticevich | 6 ft 8 in (2.03 m) | 217 lb (98 kg) | Fr | Newington College | Sydney, Australia |
| F | 42 | Cole Welle (W) | 6 ft 8 in (2.03 m) | 230 lb (104 kg) | Sr | Aptos HS | Aptos, California |

Head coach

- Wyking Jones (Loyola Marymount)

Assistant coach(es)

- Tim O'Toole (Fairfield)
- Chris Walker (Villanova)
- Theo Robertson (California)

Legend

- (C) Team captain
- (S) Suspended
- (I) Ineligible
- (W) Walk-on
- Injured
- Current redshirt

Roster

== Schedule and results ==
| Date time, TV | Rank^{#} | Opponent^{#} | Result | Record | High points | High rebounds | High assists | Site (attendance) city, state |
Exhibition
| Nov 6, 2017*; 7:00 pm, P12N | | Providence (MT) | W 81–52 | – | 20 – Coleman | 12 – Lee | 4 – Tied | Haas Pavilion (N/A); Berkeley, CA |
Non-conference regular season
| Nov 10*; 9:00 pm, P12N | | UC Riverside | L 66–74 | 0–1 | 32 – Coleman | 18 – Okoroh | 2 – Tied | Haas Pavilion (7,083); Berkeley, CA |
| Nov 12*; 1:00 pm, P12N | | Cal Poly | W 85–82 | 1–1 | 30 – Coleman | 11 – Lee | 4 – Tied | Haas Pavilion (6,405); Berkeley, CA |
| Nov 16*; 6:00 pm, P12N | | Wofford | W 79–65 | 2–1 | 17 – Tied | 11 – Lee | 5 – Lee | Haas Pavilion (6,102); Berkeley, CA |
| Nov 20*; 2:00 pm, ESPN2 | | vs. No. 6 Wichita State; Maui Invitational quarterfinals | L 82–92 | 2–2 | 35 – Coleman | 6 – Sueing | 4 – McNeill | Lahaina Civic Center (2,200); Maui, HI |
| Nov 21*; 1:00 pm, ESPN2 | | vs. VCU; Maui Invitational 2nd round consolation | L 69–83 | 2–3 | 21 – Coleman | 12 – Lee | 2 – 4 tied | Lahaina Civic Center (2,400); Maui, HI |
| Nov 22*; 11:30 am, ESPNU | | vs. Chaminade; Maui Invitational 7th place game | L 72–96 | 2–4 | 23 – Sueing | 7 – Sueing | 1 – 6 tied | Lahaina Civic Center (2,400); Maui, HI |
| Nov 28*; 8:00 pm, P12N | | Cal State Northridge | W 83–63 | 3–4 | 22 – McNeill | 7 – Lee | 4 – Harris-Dyson | Haas Pavilion (6,177); Berkeley, CA |
| Dec 2*; 8:00 pm, P12N | | Saint Mary's | L 63–74 | 3–5 | 23 – Lee | 6 – Lee | 4 – Coleman | Haas Pavilion (7,831); Berkeley, CA |
| Dec 6*; 7:00 pm, P12N | | Central Arkansas | L 69–96 | 3–6 | 20 – Coleman | 9 – Harris-Dyson | 2 – Tied | Haas Pavilion (7,813); Berkeley, CA |
| Dec 9*; 2:00 pm, CBSSN | | at San Diego State | W 63–62 | 4–6 | 19 – Coleman | 10 – Okoroh | 5 – Coleman | Viejas Arena (11,381); San Diego, CA |
| Dec 16*; 1:00 pm, P12N | | Cal State Fullerton | W 95–89 ^{OT} | 5–6 | 30 – McNeill | 12 – Lee | 6 – McNeill | Haas Pavilion (6,758); Berkeley, CA |
| Dec 19*; 7:00 pm | | at Seattle | W 81–59 | 6–6 | 20 – McNeill | 6 – Tied | 6 – Coleman | KeyArena (2,418); Seattle, WA |
| Dec 21*; 8:00 PM, P12N | | Portland State | L 81–106 | 6–7 | 19 – Coleman | 9 – Lee | 4 – Hamilton | Haas Pavilion (6,589); Berkeley, CA |
Pac-12 regular season
| Dec 30; 7:00 pm, FS1 | | at Stanford | W 77–74 | 7–7 (1–0) | 19 – Lee | 7 – Lee | 3 – Coleman | Maples Pavilion (4,293); Stanford, CA |
| Jan 4, 2018; 7:30 pm, P12N | | USC | L 62–80 | 7–8 (1–1) | 15 – Sueing | 9 – Sueing | 3 – Tied | Haas Pavilion (6,915); Berkeley, CA |
| Jan 6; 3:30 pm, P12N | | UCLA | L 84–107 | 7–9 (1–2) | 22 – Sueing | 15 – Lee | 4 – McNeill | Haas Pavilion (8,888); Berkeley, CA |
| Jan 11; 8:00 pm, P12N | | at Washington | L 56–66 | 7–10 (1–3) | 27 – Sueing | 8 – Sueing | 3 – Harris-Dyson | Alaska Airlines Arena (5,804); Seattle, WA |
| Jan 13; 1:00 pm, P12N | | at Washington State | L 53–78 | 7–11 (1–4) | 14 – Sueing | 11 – Harris-Dyson | 2 – Tied | Beasley Coliseum (3,178); Pullman, WA |
| Jan 17; 6:00 pm, P12N | | No. 14 Arizona | L 58–79 | 7–12 (1–5) | 19 – Sueing | 9 – Sueing | 2 – Okoroh | Haas Pavilion (7,721); Berkeley, CA |
| Jan 20; 7:30 pm, P12N | | No. 16 Arizona State | L 73–81 | 7–13 (1–6) | 23 – Lee | 8 – Lee | 3 – Sueing | Haas Pavilion (8,107); Berkeley, CA |
| Jan 25; 7:30 pm, FS1 | | at UCLA | L 57–70 | 7–14 (1–7) | 24 – Sueing | 13 – Okoroh | 5 – McNeil | Pauley Pavilion (8,028); Los Angeles, CA |
| Jan 28; 1:00 pm, P12N | | at USC | L 59–77 | 7–15 (1–8) | 23 – Lee | 12 – Lee | 4 – Hamilton | Galen Center (6,144); Los Angeles, CA |
| Feb 1; 6:00 pm, P12N | | Oregon | L 53–66 | 7–16 (1–9) | 16 – Coleman | 8 – Okoroh | 5 – McNeill | Haas Pavilion (7,531); Berkeley, CA |
| Feb 3; 5:00 pm, P12N | | Oregon State | W 74–70 | 8–16 (2–9) | 16 – McNeill | 12 – Okoroh | 3 – McNeill | Haas Pavilion (8,581); Berkeley, CA |
| Feb 7; 8:00 pm, ESPNU | | at Colorado | L 64–68 | 8–17 (2–10) | 12 – Tied | 12 – Lee | 2 – McNeill | Coors Events Center (6,385); Boulder, CO |
| Feb 10; 6:30 pm, P12N | | at Utah | L 43–77 | 8–18 (2–11) | 10 – McNeill | 6 – McNeill | 1 – 7 tied | Jon M. Huntsman Center (14,358); Salt Lake City, UT |
| Feb 18; 5:00 pm, ESPNU | | Stanford | L 73–77 | 8–19 (2–12) | 17 – Coleman | 9 – Lee | 4 – Coleman | Haas Pavilion (8,482); Berkeley, CA |
| Feb 22; 8:00 pm, P12N | | Washington State | L 76–78 | 8–20 (2–13) | 25 – Sueing | 9 – Harris-Dyson | 7 – Harris-Dyson | Haas Pavilion (6,552); Berkeley, CA |
| Feb 24; 1:30 pm, P12N | | Washington | L 51–68 | 8–21 (2–14) | 17 – McNeill | 5 – Tied | 4 – Coleman | Haas Pavilion (7,851); Berkeley, CA |
| Mar 1; 6:00 pm, ESPNU | | at Arizona State | L 53–84 | 8–22 (2–15) | 16 – Coleman | 5 – Tied | 2 – Tied | Wells Fargo Arena (11,737); Tempe, AZ |
| Mar 3; 3:30 pm, P12N | | at No. 19 Arizona | L 54–66 | 8–23 (2–16) | 17 – Sueing | 9 – Okoroh | 2 – Tied | McKale Center (14,644); Tucson, AZ |
Pac-12 tournament
| March 7, 2018; 2:30 pm, P12N | (12) | vs. (5) Stanford; First round | L 58–76 | 8–24 | 19 – McNeill | 8 – Coleman | 2 – Sueing | T-Mobile Arena (8,619); Paradise, NV |
*Non-conference game. ^{#}Rankings from AP Poll. (#) Tournament seedings in parentheses. All times are in Pacific Time.
