= 2017–18 Colorado Buffaloes men's basketball team =

American college basketball season

2017–18 Colorado Buffaloes men's basketball

Paradise Jam champions
- Conference: Pac-12 Conference
- Record: 17–15 (8–10 Pac-12)
- Head coach: Tad Boyle (8th season)
- Assistant coaches: Mike Rhon; Bill Grier; Kim English
- Home arena: Coors Events Center

2017–18 Pac-12 Conference men's basketball standings
	Conf.				Overall
Team	W		L	PCT	W		L	PCT
No. 12 Arizona †	14	–	4	.778	27	–	8	.771
USC	12	–	6	.667	24	–	12	.667
UCLA	11	–	7	.611	21	–	12	.636
Utah	11	–	7	.611	23	–	12	.657
Stanford	11	–	7	.611	19	–	16	.543
Oregon	10	–	8	.556	23	–	13	.639
Washington	10	–	8	.556	21	–	13	.618
Colorado	8	–	10	.444	17	–	15	.531
Arizona State	8	–	10	.444	20	–	12	.625
Oregon State	7	–	11	.389	16	–	16	.500
Washington State	4	–	14	.222	12	–	19	.387
California	2	–	16	.111	8	–	24	.250
† Pac-12 Tournament winner Rankings from AP poll

The 2017–18 Colorado Buffaloes men's basketball team represented the University of Colorado in the 2017–18 NCAA Division I men's basketball season. They were led by head coach Tad Boyle in his eighth season at Colorado. The Buffaloes played their home games at Coors Events Center in Boulder, Colorado as members of the Pac-12 Conference. They finished the season 17–15, 8–10 in Pac-12 play to finish in a tie for eighth place. They defeated Arizona State in the first round of the Pac-12 tournament before losing in the quarterfinals to Arizona.

== Previous season ==
The Buffaloes finished the 2016–17 season 19–15, 8–10 in Pac-12 play to finish in seventh place. They defeated Washington State in the first round of the Pac-12 tournament to advance to the quarterfinals where they lost to Arizona. They were invited to the National Invitation Tournament where they lost in the first round to UCF.

== Off-season ==
=== Departures ===
Name	Pos.	Height	Weight	Year	Hometown	Reason for departure
Josh Fortune	G	6'5"	200	RS Senior	Hampton, VA	Graduated
Wesley Gordon	F	6'9"	220	RS Senior	Colorado Springs, CO	Graduated
Xavier Johnson	F	6'7"	225	RS Senior	Los Angeles, CA	Graduated
Derrick White	G	6'5"	193	RS Senior	Parker, CO	Graduated/2017 NBA draft
Thomas Akyazili	G	6'2"	180	Sophomore	Antwerp, BE	Elected to transfer.
Bryce Peters	G	6'4"	190	Freshman	La Puente, CA	Elected to transfer.

=== 2017 recruiting class ===
College recruiting
Name	Hometown	School	Height	Weight	Commit date
D'Shawn Schwartz; SF	Colorado Springs, CO	Sand Creek HS	6 ft 5 in (1.96 m)	222 lb (101 kg)	Sep 10, 2016
D'Shawn Schwartz; SF	Recruit ratings: Scout: Rivals: 247Sports: ESPN: (83)				
Tyler Bey; SF	Las Vegas, NV	Middlebrooks Academy	6 ft 8 in (2.03 m)	200 lb (91 kg)	Sep 10, 2016
Tyler Bey; SF	Recruit ratings: Scout: Rivals: 247Sports: ESPN: (76)				
Evan Battey; PF	Los Angeles, CA	Villa Park HS	6 ft 6 in (1.98 m)	280 lb (130 kg)	Sep 27, 2016
Evan Battey; PF	Recruit ratings: Scout: Rivals: 247Sports: ESPN: (82)				
Lazar Nikolic; PG	Belgrade, Serbia	Stella Azzurra Academy	6 ft 6 in (1.98 m)	200 lb (91 kg)	Apr 19, 2017
Lazar Nikolic; PG	Recruit ratings: Scout: Rivals: 247Sports: ESPN: (NR)				
McKinley Wright IV; PG	Champlin, MN	Champlin Park HS	6 ft 0 in (1.83 m)	177 lb (80 kg)	Apr 28, 2017
McKinley Wright IV; PG	Recruit ratings: Scout: Rivals: 247Sports: ESPN: (NR)				
Overall recruit ranking:
Note: In many cases, Scout, Rivals, 247Sports, On3, and ESPN may conflict in their listings of height and weight.; In these cases, the average was taken. ESPN grades are on a 100-point scale.; Sources: "2017 Team Ranking". Rivals.

=== 2018 Recruiting class ===
College recruiting (2018)
Name	Hometown	School	Height	Weight	Commit date
Daylen Kountz; SG	Denver, CO	East High School	6 ft 4 in (1.93 m)	170 lb (77 kg)	Sep 8, 2017
Daylen Kountz; SG	Recruit ratings: Scout: Rivals: 247Sports: ESPN:				
Elijah Parquet; SG	Beaumont, TX	West Brook High School	6 ft 4 in (1.93 m)	185 lb (84 kg)	Sep 9, 2017
Elijah Parquet; SG	Recruit ratings: Scout: Rivals: 247Sports: ESPN:				
Overall recruit ranking:
Note: In many cases, Scout, Rivals, 247Sports, On3, and ESPN may conflict in their listings of height and weight.; In these cases, the average was taken. ESPN grades are on a 100-point scale.; Sources: "2018 Colorado Commits". Rivals.; "2018 Team Ranking". Rivals.

== Roster ==
2017–18 Colorado Buffaloes men's basketball team
Players
Coaches

Pos.	#	Name	Height	Weight	Year	Previous school	Hometown
G/F	0	D'Shawn Schwartz	6 ft 7 in (2.01 m)	223 lb (101 kg)	Fr	Sand Creek HS	Colorado Springs, CO
G/F	1	Tyler Bey	6 ft 7 in (2.01 m)	206 lb (93 kg)	Fr	Middlebrooks Academy	Las Vegas, NV
G	5	Deleon Brown	6 ft 4 in (1.93 m)	165 lb (75 kg)	So	Brewster Academy	Grand Rapids, MI
F	10	Alexander Strating (W)	6 ft 7 in (2.01 m)	215 lb (98 kg)	RS Fr	American School of The Hague	Wassenaars, Netherlands
G	11	Lazar Nikolic	6 ft 7 in (2.01 m)	205 lb (93 kg)	Fr	A.S. Stella Azzurra	Belgrade, Serbia
G	12	AJ Martinka (W)	6 ft 5 in (1.96 m)	195 lb (88 kg)	Fr	Stanwood HS	Stanwood, WA
G	13	Namon Wright	6 ft 5 in (1.96 m)	205 lb (93 kg)	RS Jr	Missouri	Los Angeles, CA
F	14	Tory Miller-Stewart	6 ft 9 in (2.06 m)	246 lb (112 kg)	Sr	New Hampton School	Lee's Summit, MO
G	15	Dominique Collier	6 ft 2 in (1.88 m)	176 lb (80 kg)	Sr	East HS	Denver, CO
F	21	Evan Battey (redshirt)	6 ft 8 in (2.03 m)	283 lb (128 kg)	Fr	Villa Park HS	Los Angeles, CA
F	23	Lucas Siewert	6 ft 10 in (2.08 m)	224 lb (102 kg)	RS So	Brennan HS	Joinville, Brazil
G	24	George King	6 ft 6 in (1.98 m)	225 lb (102 kg)	RS Sr	Cathedral HS	Fayetteville, NC
G	25	McKinley Wright IV	6 ft 0 in (1.83 m)	185 lb (84 kg)	Fr	Champlin Park HS	North Robbinsdale, MN
G	33	Josh Repine (W)	6 ft 3 in (1.91 m)	195 lb (88 kg)	Sr	New Hampton School	Englewood, CO
F/C	35	Dallas Walton	7 ft 0 in (2.13 m)	230 lb (104 kg)	RS Fr	Arvada West	Arvada, CO

Head coach

- Tad Boyle (Kansas)

Assistant coach(es)

- Mike Rohn (McPherson)
- Bill Grier (Oregon)
- Kim English (Missouri)

Legend

- (C) Team captain
- (S) Suspended
- (I) Ineligible
- (W) Walk-on
- Injured
- Current redshirt

Roster

== Schedule and results ==
Date time, TV	Rank^{#}	Opponent^{#}	Result	Record	Site (attendance) city, state
Exhibition
Oct 30, 2017*; 7:00 pm		Colorado Mines	W 78–52	–	Coors Events Center (1,112); Boulder, CO
Non-conference regular season
Nov 10, 2017*; 6:00 pm, P12N		Northern Colorado	W 66–51	1–0	Coors Events Center (7,740); Boulder, CO
Nov 14, 2017*; 7:00 pm, P12N		Denver	W 89–62	2–0	Coors Events Center (6,451); Boulder, CO
Nov 17, 2017*; 3:30 pm		vs. Quinnipiac; Paradise Jam quarterfinals	W 70–69	3–0	Vines Center (659); Lynchburg, VA
Nov 18, 2017*; 6:30 pm		vs. Drake; Paradise Jam semifinals	W 86–81	4–0	Vines Center (568); Lynchburg, VA
Nov 19, 2017*; 6:30 pm		vs. Mercer; Paradise Jam championship	W 79–70	5–0	Vines Center (568); Lynchburg, VA
Nov 26, 2017*; 12:00 pm, P12N		Air Force	W 81–69	6–0	Coors Events Center (7,427); Boulder, CO
Dec 2, 2017*; 11:00 AM, ATTSNRM		at Colorado State	L 63–72	6–1	Moby Arena (5,217); Fort Collins, CO
Dec 6, 2017*; 7:00 pm, P12N		New Mexico	W 75–57	7–1	Coors Events Center (6,610); Boulder, CO
Dec 9, 2017*; 3:00 pm, FS1		at No. 13 Xavier	L 69–96	7–2	Cintas Center (10,228); Cincinnati, OH
Dec 12, 2017*; 6:00 pm, P12N		San Diego	L 59–69	7–3	Coors Events Center (6,512); Boulder, CO
Dec 15, 2017*; 6:00 pm, P12N		South Dakota State	W 112–103 ^{2OT}	8–3	Coors Events Center (6,933); Boulder, CO
Dec 22, 2017*; 7:00 pm, BTN		vs. Iowa; Sanford Pentagon Showcase	L 73–80	8–4	Sanford Pentagon (3,250); Sioux Falls, SD
Pac-12 regular season
Dec 29, 2017; 9:00 pm, ESPNU		at Oregon State	L 57–76	8–5 (0–1)	Gill Coliseum (4,481); Corvallis, OR
Dec 31, 2017; 8:00 pm, P12N		at Oregon	L 62–77	8–6 (0–2)	Matthew Knight Arena (7,458); Eugene, OR
Jan 4, 2018; 6:30 pm, P12N		No. 4 Arizona State	W 90–81 ^{OT}	9–6 (1–2)	Coors Events Center (7,740); Boulder, CO
Jan 6, 2018; 12:00 pm, P12N		No. 14 Arizona	W 80–77	10–6 (2–2)	Coors Events Center (8,519); Boulder, CO
Jan 10, 2018; 8:00 pm, FS1		at USC	L 58–70	10–7 (2–3)	Galen Center (3,669); Los Angeles, CA
Jan 13, 2018; 8:30 pm, P12N		at UCLA	W 68–59	11–7 (3–3)	Pauley Pavilion (10,164); Los Angeles, CA
Jan 18, 2018; 6:00 pm, P12N		Washington State	W 82–73	12–7 (4–3)	Coors Events Center (7,477); Boulder, CO
Jan 20, 2018; 4:00 pm, P12N		Washington	L 62–72	12–8 (4–4)	Coors Events Center (8,787); Boulder, CO
Jan 25, 2018; 6:30 pm, FS1		at No. 11 Arizona	L 71–80	12–9 (4–5)	McKale Center (14,644); Tucson, AZ
Jan 27, 2018; 6:00 pm, ESPNU		at No. 21 Arizona State	L 66–80	12–10 (4–6)	Wells Fargo Arena (13,943); Tempe, AZ
Feb 2, 2018; 7:00 pm, FS1		at Utah	W 67–55	13–10 (5–6)	Coors Events Center (7,645); Boulder, CO
Feb 7, 2018; 9:00 pm, ESPNU		California	W 68–64	14–10 (6–6)	Coors Events Center (6,385); Boulder, CO
Feb 11, 2018; 2:00 pm, P12N		Stanford	W 64–56	15–10 (7–6)	Coors Events Center (8,323); Boulder, CO
Feb 15, 2018; 9:00 pm, P12N		at Washington State	L 69–73	15–11 (7–7)	Beasley Coliseum (2,249); Pullman, WA
Feb 17, 2018; 6:00 pm, P12N		at Washington	L 59–82	15–12 (7–8)	Alaska Airlines Arena (9,258); Seattle, WA
Feb 21, 2018; 8:30 pm, FS1		USC	L 64–75	15–13 (7–9)	Coors Events Center (7,008); Boulder, CO
Feb 25, 2018; 2:00 pm, ESPNU		UCLA	W 80–76	16–13 (8–9)	Coors Events Center (8,176); Boulder, CO
Mar 3, 2018; 5:00 pm, P12N		at Utah	L 54–64	16–14 (8–10)	Jon M. Huntsman Center; Salt Lake City, UT
Pac-12 tournament
Mar 7, 2018; 1:00 pm, P12N	(8)	vs. (9) Arizona State; First Round	W 97–85	17–14	T-Mobile Arena (8,619); Paradise, NV
Mar 8, 2018; 1:00 pm, P12N	(8)	vs. (1) No. 15 Arizona; Quarterfinals	L 67–83	17–15	T-Mobile Arena (15,182); Paradise, NV
*Non-conference game. ^{#}Rankings from AP Poll. (#) Tournament seedings in parentheses. All times are in Mountain Time.
