= Thomas Welsh (basketball) =

American basketball player (born 1996)

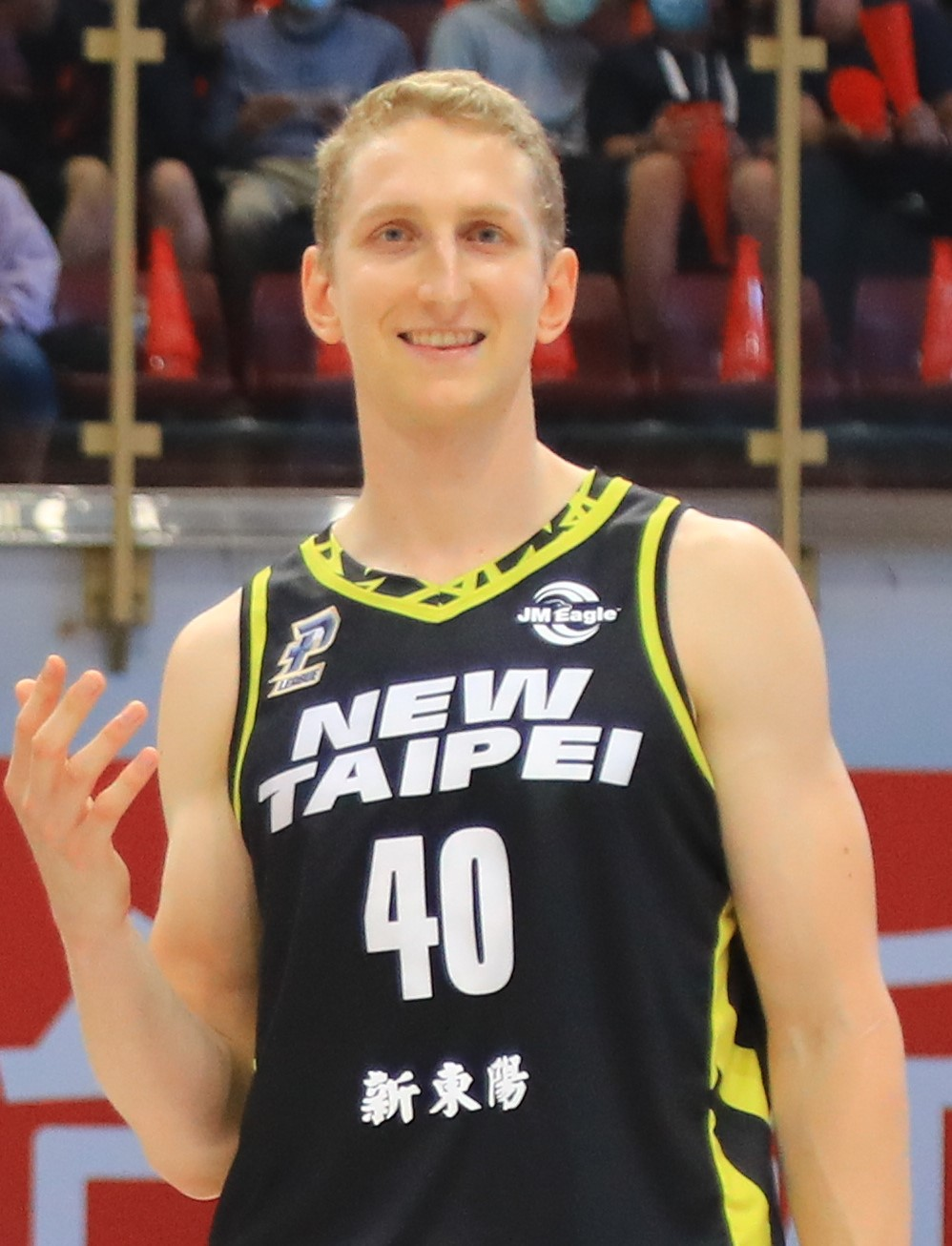
- Welsh with the New Taipei Kings in 2021

No. 40 – New Taipei Kings
- Position: Center
- League: Taiwan Professional Basketball League

Personal information
- Born: February 3, 1996 (age 30) Torrance, California, U.S.
- Listed height: 7 ft 0 in (2.13 m)
- Listed weight: 255 lb (116 kg)

Career information
- High school: Loyola (Los Angeles, California)
- College: UCLA (2014–2018)
- NBA draft: 2018: 2nd round, 58th overall pick
- Drafted by: Denver Nuggets
- Playing career: 2018–present

Career history
- 2018–2019: Denver Nuggets
- 2018: →Capital City Go-Go
- 2019: →Iowa Wolves
- 2019–2020: Greensboro Swarm
- 2020–2021: Oostende
- 2021–2022: New Taipei Kings
- 2022–2023: Passlab Yamagata Wyverns
- 2023–2025: Levanga Hokkaido
- 2025–2026: Sun Rockers Shibuya
- 2026–present: New Taipei Kings

Career highlights
- Belgian Supercup winner (2021); 2× B.League rebounding leader (2024, 2025); Second-team All-Pac-12 (2018); McDonald's All-American (2014)
- Stats at NBA.com
- Stats at Basketball Reference
Medals
Men's basketball
Representing the United States
FIBA U19 World Championship
Gold medal – first place	2015 Greece	National team

Thomas Clark Welsh (born February 3, 1996) is an American professional basketball player for the New Taipei Kings of the Taiwan Professional Basketball League (TPBL). He played college basketball for the UCLA Bruins. As a senior in 2017–18, Welsh earned second-team all-conference honors in the Pac-12. He was selected by the Denver Nuggets in the second round of the 2018 NBA draft with the 58th overall pick.

Welsh was a McDonald's All-American in high school. After leading UCLA in blocks as a freshman reserve, he was a member of the United States national team that won the gold medal at the FIBA Under-19 World Championship in 2015. He started for the Bruins as a sophomore and junior, leading the team in rebounds while also continuing to be their top shot blocker. As an NBA rookie, he played with Denver on a two-way contract.

== Early life and high school career ==
Welsh was born in Torrance, California, in Los Angeles County, to Pat and Kathy Welsh as the middle brother of Jack and Henry Welsh. At age five, he started playing basketball. He attended Loyola High School in Los Angeles. As a 6-foot-5-inch (1.96 m) freshman, Welsh played basketball on the junior varsity team, where he was ranked eighth on the team's depth chart. He was promoted to the varsity team as a sophomore, moving up the depth chart to seventh. He did not become a starter until his junior year, by which time he had grown to 7 feet (2.1 m). Still, he was only considered a prospect for mid-major colleges at the time, or perhaps a redshirt at a Pac-12 Conference school.

The following summer, Welsh performed well with the Los Angeles Rockfish, the longest ongoing high school all-star program in Southern California. He emerged as one of the top centers in California as a senior, and was selected for the 2014 McDonald's All-American Game, a rarity for a player who did not receive national recognition as a junior. He was rated as a four-star (on a scale of five) recruit.

== College career ==
=== Freshman ===
In November 2013, Welsh committed to play at UCLA over fellow Pac-12 schools California and Stanford. As a freshman with the Bruins in 2014–15, he spent most of the season as a backup to junior Tony Parker. Welsh played in all 36 games, starting in three, and averaged 3.8 points and 3.8 rebounds per game. He led the team in blocks, averaging 1.1 per game as a reserve. He became the Bruins' first 7-foot player since Ryan Hollins in 2005–06. In the season opener against Montana State, Welsh scored 14 points in 13 minutes of play. He had six rebounds and four blocked shots in 22 minutes in an upset victory over SMU in UCLA's opening game of the 2015 NCAA tournament. Playing the final minutes of the game in place of Parker, he made a key block with 34 seconds remaining and UCLA down by four.

=== Sophomore ===
Having played on the U.S. under-19 national team over the summer, Welsh's footwork and fundamentals improved. With Kevon Looney having moved on to the National Basketball Association (NBA), Welsh was promoted to UCLA's starting lineup at center, while Parker moved to forward. In the 2015–16 season opener, he had his first collegiate double-double with 12 points, 10 rebounds and a career-high five blocks in an 84–81 overtime loss to Monmouth. The blocks were the most by a Bruin since Travis Wear's five in 2012. In the following game, Welsh scored a career-high 22 on 10-for-12 shooting in an 88–83 win over Cal Poly. On December 3, against No. 1 Kentucky, he registered game highs of 21 points and 11 rebounds and outplayed highly touted Wildcats freshman Skal Labissière in an 87–77 upset win, the Bruins' first victory over a No. 1-ranked team since 2003. On January 9, 2016, he had a season-high 16 rebounds in an 81–74 win over Arizona State, which helped UCLA avoid falling to 1–3 in the Pac-12 for the first time in almost 20 years. After UCLA lost three of four games in mid-February, Welsh became a reserve after offering to coaches that Parker could take his place in the starting lineup; the senior Parker had been benched in favor of a quicker Jonah Bolden. The Bruins lost their final five games to finish with a 15–17 record. Welsh ended the season with an 11.2 scoring average, and led UCLA in field goal percentage (59.0), rebounding (8.5) and blocked shots (1.0). He ranked seventh in the Pac-12 in rebounding, second in offensive rebounds per game (3.2), and third in field goal percentage.

=== Junior ===
UCLA began 2016–17 ranked No. 2 after starting 13–0, the first time they were undefeated in non-conference play since they won a national championship in 1994–95. Welsh was leading the Bruins in rebounding again, but had missed the last four games with a bruised right knee. He returned in the conference opener, but the Bruins suffered their first defeat in an 89–87 loss to No. 21 Oregon despite Welsh's 20 points, 10 rebounds and three blocks. On February 19, 2017, he scored 16 points and had a season-high 16 rebounds in a 102–70 win over their crosstown rivals, USC, ending a four-game losing streak against the Trojans. On February 25, Welsh scored 12 of his 14 points in the second half to lead No. 5 UCLA to a 77–72 win over No. 4 Arizona, which also snapped their conference rivals' 21-game home winning streak. In the Bruins' regular-season finale, he had 13 points and 11 rebounds and also made his first career three-point field goal in a 77–68 win over Washington State. The Bruins ended the season 31–5 after losing in the Sweet 16 of the 2017 NCAA tournament to Kentucky. For the season, Welsh averaged 10.8 points along with team highs of 8.7 rebounds and 1.3 blocks per game, and he received an honorable mention for the All-Pac-12 team. Although he was not listed in most mock drafts, he declared for the 2017 NBA draft. After attending the NBA Draft Combine but not hiring an agent, he withdrew his name from the draft to retain his college eligibility.

=== Senior ===
Over the summer, Welsh worked on his three-point shooting based on feedback from his NBA workout with the Oklahoma City Thunder. He was the Bruins' lone returning starter in 2017–18. On December 9, 2017, he tied a career high with 22 points and added 10 rebounds in a 78–69 overtime loss to Michigan. On January 4, 2018, Welsh required three stitches after being bloodied by a hit to his nose. He was forced him to wear a protective mask after halftime, which affected his shooting as UCLA lost 107–99 in double overtime. He continued wearing a mask the following game, but adjusted for 19 points, 14 rebounds, and a career-high four three-pointers in a 107–84 win over Cal. On February 15, he played his first game without a mask since January and logged a career-high 17 rebounds along with 15 points in a 75–68 victory over Oregon State. In UCLA's Pac-12 tournament opener, Welsh had 18 points, 11 rebounds, and tied his career-high of four three-pointers in an 88–77 win over Stanford. The Bruins qualified for the 2018 NCAA tournament, but lost 65–58 to St. Bonaventure in the First Four for the Bonnies' first tournament win in 48 years. Welsh was limited to just two points, but had 15 rebounds to pass David Greenwood as the Bruins' third all-time leading rebounder, behind only Kareem Abdul-Jabbar and Bill Walton.

Welsh completed the season averaging 12.6 points and 10.8 rebounds. He made 40.2 percent (45-for-112) from 3-point range after attempting just one in his first three seasons. One of just two players along with Arizona's Deandre Ayton to average a double-double in the Pac-12, he earned second-team All-Pac-12 honors. The United States Basketball Writers Association (USBWA) voted him to their All-District IX Team, and he was a finalist for the Kareem Abdul-Jabbar Award, which recognizes the top center in Division I men's college basketball.

== Professional career ==
=== Denver Nuggets (2018–2019) ===
In the 2018 NBA draft, Welsh was selected in the second round with the 58th overall pick by the Denver Nuggets. On July 19, 2018, Welsh was signed by the Nuggets to a two-way contract. Because the Nuggets were one of only three NBA teams to not have an NBA G League affiliate, Welsh was assigned to Washington Wizards affiliate Capital City Go-Go. Nuggets assistant coach Wes Unseld Jr. was impressed early by Welsh's constant talking—calling out coverages and directing teammates on the court—in spite of his youth and inexperience. Welsh made his NBA debut on October 17, 2018, against the Los Angeles Clippers, seeing under one minute of game action and scoring no points. On January 1, 2019, the Nuggets transferred Welsh from Capital City to the Iowa Wolves. On July 30, 2019, Welsh was waived by the Nuggets.

=== Greensboro Swarm (2019–2020) ===
On August 9, 2019, Welsh signed with the Charlotte Hornets. He was waived during training camp in October, but joined their G League affiliate, the Greensboro Swarm, later in the month as an affiliate player. On January 17, 2020, he posted 22 points, 15 rebounds and four assists in a loss to the Fort Wayne Mad Ants. Welsh ended the season with averages of around 11 points and nine rebounds per game.

=== Filou Oostende (2020–2021) ===
On August 31, 2020, Welsh signed with Filou Oostende of the Belgian Pro Basketball League.

=== New Taipei Kings (2021–2022) ===
On September 24, 2021, Welsh signed with New Taipei Kings of the Taiwan P. League+.

=== Yamagata Wyverns (2022–2023) ===
On August 9, 2022, Welsh signed with Yamagata Wyverns of the B.League.

=== Levanga Hokkaido (2023–2025) ===
On June 26, 2023, Welsh signed with Levanga Hokkaido of the B.League.

=== Sun Rockers Shibuya (2025–2026) ===
On June 3, 2025, Welsh signed with Sun Rockers Shibuya of the B.League.

=== New Taipei Kings (2026–present) ===
On July 29, 2026, Welsh returned to the New Taipei Kings of the Taiwan Professional Basketball League (TPBL).

== National team career ==
Welsh tried out for the United States national team in the 2014 FIBA Americas Under-18 Championship, but was one of the final three roster cuts. The following year after his first season with UCLA, he was one of 12 players selected by the U.S. to play at the 2015 FIBA Under-19 World Championship in Greece. He was not considered a top contender when tryouts began, but he made an impression with his rebounding and perimeter play. The Americans won the gold medal after a 79–71 win over Croatia. Welsh played in all seven games, averaging 2.7 points and 3.3 rebounds in 8.9 minutes.

== Career statistics ==
Legend
GP	Games played	GS	Games started	MPG	Minutes per game
FG%	Field goal percentage	3P%	3-point field goal percentage	FT%	Free throw percentage
RPG	Rebounds per game	APG	Assists per game	SPG	Steals per game
BPG	Blocks per game	PPG	Points per game	**Bold**	Career high

=== NBA ===
==== Regular season ====
Year	Team	GP	GS	MPG	FG%	3P%	FT%	RPG	APG	SPG	BPG	PPG
2018–19	Denver	11	0	3.3	.538	.429	.500	.4	.5	.0	.0	1.6
Career		11	0	3.3	.538	.429	.500	.4	.5	.0	.0	1.6

=== College ===
Year	Team	GP	GS	MPG	FG%	3P%	FT%	RPG	APG	SPG	BPG	PPG
2014–15	UCLA	**36**	3	15.7	.470	—	.609	3.8	.2	.4	1.1	3.8
2015–16	UCLA	31	26	26.8	**.590**	—	.756	8.5	.5	.3	1.0	11.2
2016–17	UCLA	32	32	25.1	.585	**1.000**	**.894**	8.7	1.0	.3	**1.3**	10.8
2017–18	UCLA	33	**33**	**33.2**	.485	.402	.828	**10.8**	**1.4**	**.7**	.9	**12.6**
Career		132	94	25.0	.537	.407	.798	7.8	.8	.4	1.1	9.5
