= 2017–18 UCLA Bruins men's basketball team =

American college basketball season

2017–18 UCLA Bruins men's basketball

NCAA tournament, First Four
- Conference: Pac-12 Conference
- Record: 21–12 (11–7 Pac-12)
- Head coach: Steve Alford (5th season)
- Assistant coaches: Duane Broussard; David Grace; Tyus Edney
- Home arena: Pauley Pavilion (Capacity: 13,819)

2017–18 Pac-12 Conference men's basketball standings
	Conf.				Overall
Team	W		L	PCT	W		L	PCT
No. 12 Arizona †	14	–	4	.778	27	–	8	.771
USC	12	–	6	.667	24	–	12	.667
UCLA	11	–	7	.611	21	–	12	.636
Utah	11	–	7	.611	23	–	12	.657
Stanford	11	–	7	.611	19	–	16	.543
Oregon	10	–	8	.556	23	–	13	.639
Washington	10	–	8	.556	21	–	13	.618
Colorado	8	–	10	.444	17	–	15	.531
Arizona State	8	–	10	.444	20	–	12	.625
Oregon State	7	–	11	.389	16	–	16	.500
Washington State	4	–	14	.222	12	–	19	.387
California	2	–	16	.111	8	–	24	.250
† Pac-12 Tournament winner Rankings from AP poll

The 2017–18 UCLA Bruins men's basketball team represented the University of California, Los Angeles during the 2017–18 NCAA Division I men's basketball season. The Bruins were led by fifth-year head coach Steve Alford and played their home games at Pauley Pavilion as members in the Pac-12 Conference. They finished the season 21–12, 11–7 in Pac-12 play to finish in a three-way tie for third place.

The Bruins opened their new practice facility, the Mo Ostin Basketball Center. They defeated Stanford in the quarterfinals of the Pac-12 tournament to advance to the semifinals, where they lost to Arizona. They received an at-large bid to the NCAA tournament, where they lost 65–58 in the First Four to St. Bonaventure for the Bonnies' first tournament win in 48 years. This was the first time in UCLA's history that they had been relegated to a First Four play-in game. This was the first time in the school's four tournament appearances under Alford that they did not advance to the Sweet 16.

== Previous season ==
The Bruins finished the 2016–17 season 31–5 overall; and 15–3 in the conference. During the season, UCLA was invited and participated in the Wooden Legacy in Anaheim, California. UCLA defeated Portland, Nebraska, and Texas A&M to earn 1st place. UCLA also defeated Ohio State in the CBS Sports Classic in Paradise, Nevada. In the postseason, UCLA defeated USC but lost to Arizona in the semifinals of the 2017 Pac-12 Conference men's basketball tournament in Paradise, Nevada. The Bruins were invited and participated in the 2017 NCAA Division I men's basketball tournament, where they defeated Kent State and Cincinnati in Sacramento, California but lost to Kentucky in Memphis, Tennessee in the Sweet Sixteen.

== Off-season ==
=== Departures ===
Name	Pos.	Height	Weight	Year	Hometown	Reason for departure
Bryce Alford	G	6'3"	185	Senior	Albuquerque, NM	Graduated
Isaac Hamilton	G	6'5"	195	Senior	Los Angeles, CA	Graduated
Jerrold Smith	G	6'0"	165	Senior	Los Angeles, CA	Walk-on; Graduated
Ike Anigbogu	F/C	6'10"	250	Freshman	Corona, CA	Declared for 2017 NBA draft; drafted 47th overall to the Indiana Pacers
Lonzo Ball	G	6'6"	190	Freshman	Chino Hills, CA	Declared for 2017 NBA draft; drafted 2nd overall to the Los Angeles Lakers
T. J. Leaf	F	6'10"	225	Freshman	El Cajon, CA	Declared for 2017 NBA draft; drafted 18th overall to the Indiana Pacers

=== 2017 recruiting class ===
UCLA recruits at the 2017 McDonald's All-American Boys Game

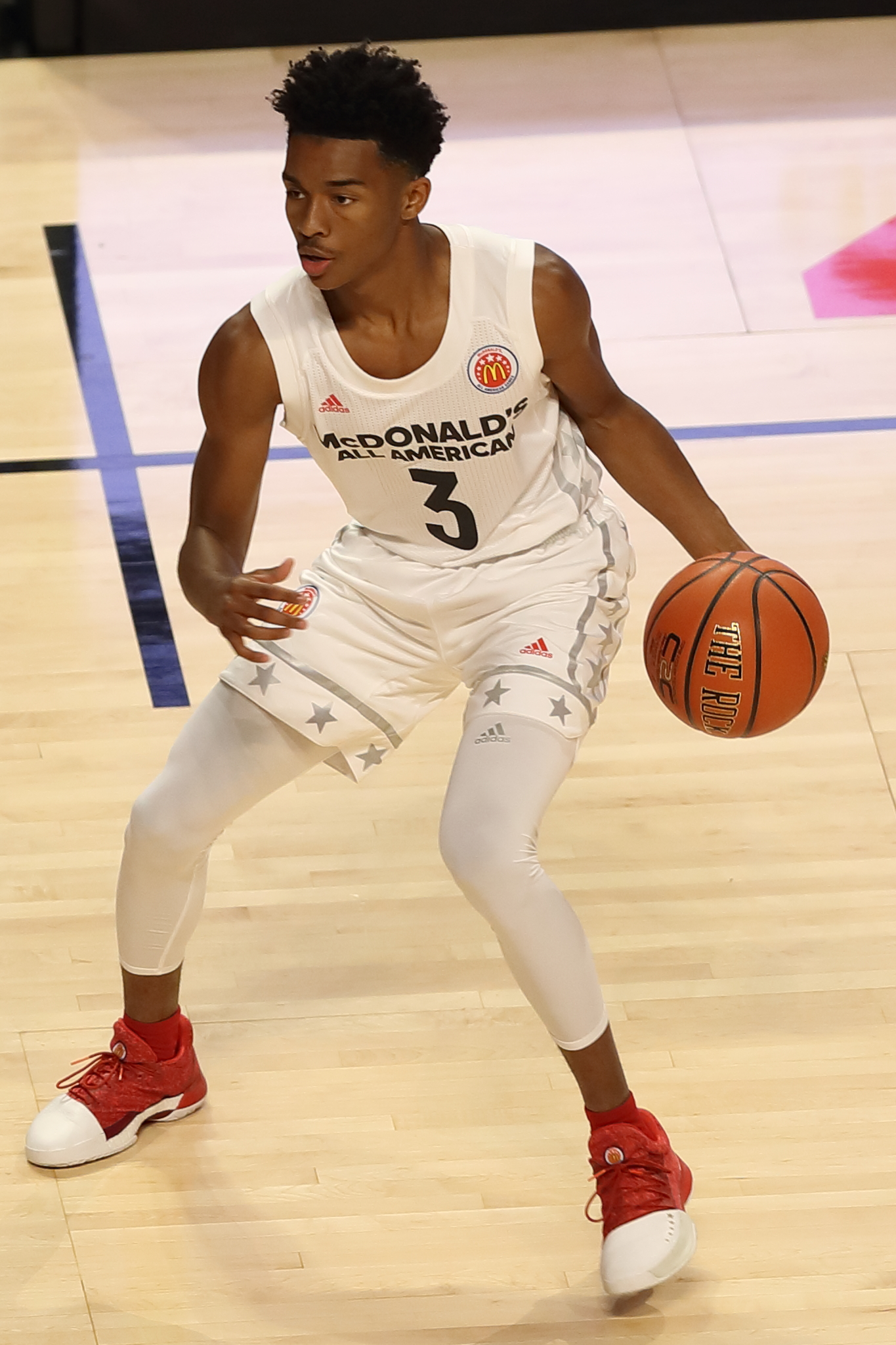
Jaylen Hands

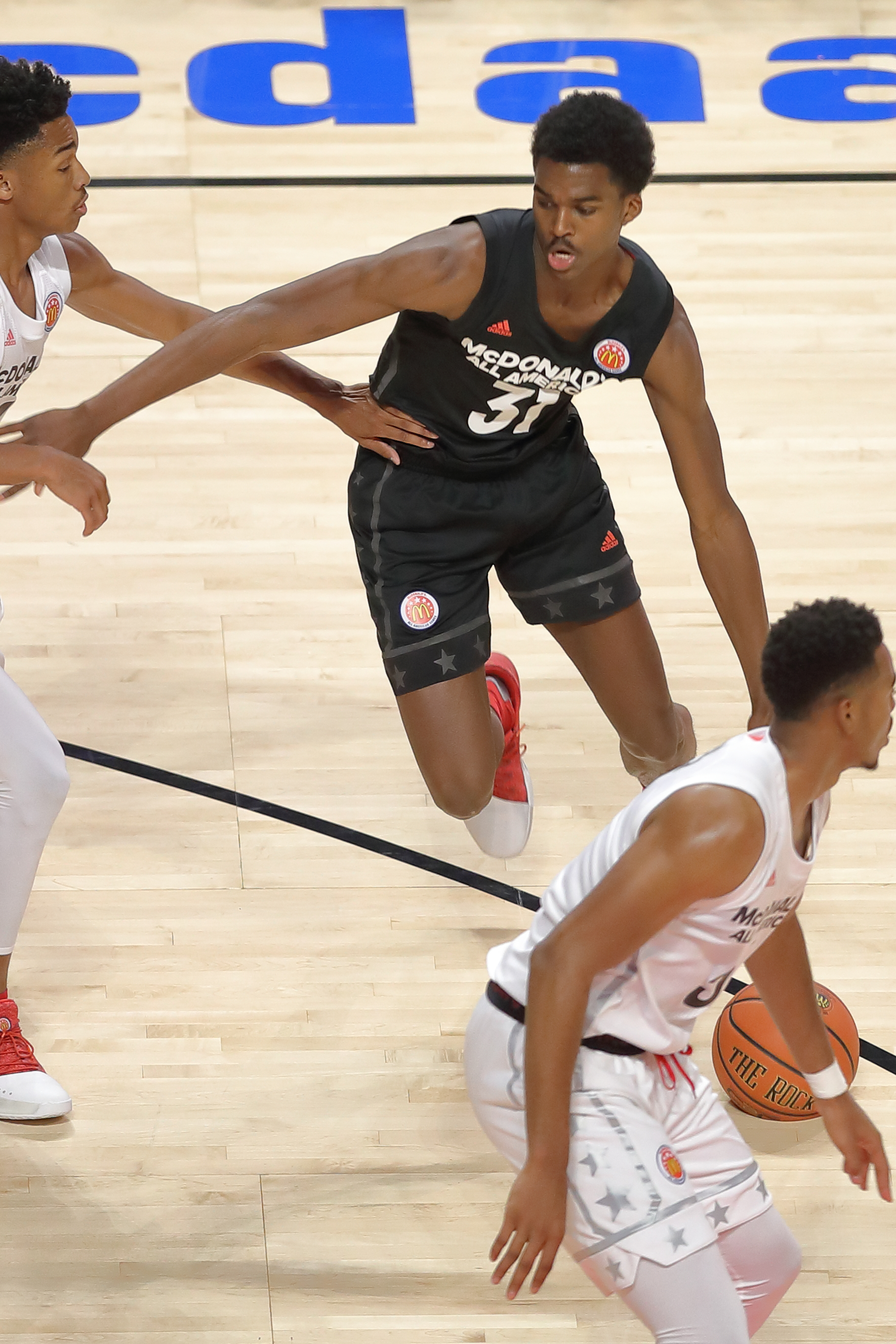
Kris Wilkes

College recruiting
Name	Hometown	School	Height	Weight	Commit date
LiAngelo Ball; F/G	Chino Hills, CA	Chino Hills HS	6 ft 6 in (1.98 m)	215 lb (98 kg)	Apr 21, 2015
LiAngelo Ball; F/G	Recruit ratings: Scout: Rivals: 247Sports: ESPN: (79)				
Jalen Hill; PF	Corona, CA	Centennial HS	6 ft 8 in (2.03 m)	210 lb (95 kg)	Jun 28, 2015
Jalen Hill; PF	Recruit ratings: Scout: Rivals: 247Sports: ESPN: (86)				
Jaylen Hands; PG	San Diego, CA	Foothills Christian HS	6 ft 2 in (1.88 m)	168 lb (76 kg)	Sep 16, 2015
Jaylen Hands; PG	Recruit ratings: Scout: Rivals: 247Sports: ESPN: (93)				
Cody Riley; PF	Chatsworth, CA	Sierra Canyon School	6 ft 7 in (2.01 m)	234 lb (106 kg)	Oct 14, 2016
Cody Riley; PF	Recruit ratings: Scout: Rivals: 247Sports: ESPN: (88)				
Chris Smith; SF	Fort Worth, TX	Huntington Prep School	6 ft 8 in (2.03 m)	192 lb (87 kg)	Feb 11, 2017
Chris Smith; SF	Recruit ratings: Scout: Rivals: 247Sports: ESPN: (82)				
Kris Wilkes; SF	Indianapolis, IN	North Central HS	6 ft 7.5 in (2.02 m)	191 lb (87 kg)	Nov 13, 2016
Kris Wilkes; SF	Recruit ratings: Scout: Rivals: 247Sports: ESPN: (95)				
Overall recruit ranking: Scout: #2 Rivals: #2 247Sports: #4 ESPN: #4
Note: In many cases, Scout, Rivals, 247Sports, On3, and ESPN may conflict in their listings of height and weight.; In these cases, the average was taken. ESPN grades are on a 100-point scale.; Sources: "2017 UCLA Basketball Commitment List". Rivals.; "2017 UCLA Player Commits". ESPN.; "2017 Team Ranking". Rivals.

== Roster ==
2017–18 UCLA Bruins men's basketball team
Players
Coaches

Pos.	#	Name	Height	Weight	Year	Previous school	Hometown
F	0	Alex Olesinski	6 ft 10 in (2.08 m)	220 lb (100 kg)	RS So	La Lumiere School	Roswell, New Mexico
F	2	Cody Riley (S) (redshirt)	6 ft 10 in (2.08 m)	265 lb (120 kg)	Fr	Sierra Canyon School	Kansas City, Kansas
G	3	Aaron Holiday	6 ft 1 in (1.85 m)	185 lb (84 kg)	Jr	Campbell Hall School	Chatsworth, California
G	4	Jaylen Hands	6 ft 3 in (1.91 m)	175 lb (79 kg)	Fr	Foothills Christian HS	San Diego, California
G	5	Chris Smith	6 ft 9 in (2.06 m)	200 lb (91 kg)	Fr	Huntington Prep School	Chicago, Illinois
G	10	Isaac Wulff (W)	6 ft 3 in (1.91 m)	180 lb (82 kg)	So	Laguna Beach HS	Laguna Beach, California
G	13	Kris Wilkes	6 ft 8 in (2.03 m)	195 lb (88 kg)	Fr	North Central HS	Indianapolis, Indiana
F	14	György Golomán	6 ft 11 in (2.11 m)	225 lb (102 kg)	Sr	The Sagemont School	Körmend, Hungary
G	21	Alec Wulff (W)	6 ft 3 in (1.91 m)	185 lb (84 kg)	Sr	Laguna Beach HS	Laguna Beach, California
G	22	Armani Dodson (W)	6 ft 5 in (1.96 m)	190 lb (86 kg)	So	Henry J. Kaiser HS	Fontana, California
G	23	Prince Ali	6 ft 3 in (1.91 m)	190 lb (86 kg)	RS So	Sagemont School	The Bronx, New York
F	24	Jalen Hill (S) (redshirt)	6 ft 10 in (2.08 m)	230 lb (104 kg)	Fr	Centennial HS	Corona, California
G	30	Joseph Wallace (W)	6 ft 2 in (1.88 m)	185 lb (84 kg)	Fr	Sierra Canyon	Woodland Hills, California
C	34	Ikenna Okwarabizie	6 ft 9 in (2.06 m)	255 lb (116 kg)	Sr	Tyler Junior College	Lagos, Nigeria
C	40	Thomas Welsh (C)	7 ft 0 in (2.13 m)	255 lb (116 kg)	Sr	Loyola HS	Redondo Beach, California

Head coach

- Steve Alford (Indiana)

Assistant coach(es)

- Duane Broussard (Bradley)
- David Grace (Park)
- Tyus Edney (UCLA)

Legend

- (C) Team captain
- (S) Suspended
- (I) Ineligible
- (W) Walk-on
- Injured
- Current redshirt

Roster
Last update: December 7, 2017

== China incident ==
At the start of the regular season, three of UCLA's players, Jalen Hill, Cody Riley, and LiAngelo Ball, were arrested in China for allegedly shoplifting before their game against Georgia Tech. The arrested players were confined to their hotel for several days until the charges were dropped and they were allowed to leave the country.

The players involved were suspended indefinitely from the team after their return to campus, with LiAngelo eventually withdrawing from UCLA on December 4, 2017. He would go on to play professionally overseas in Lithuania with his younger brother LaMelo.

On December 22, 2017, UCLA announced that the other two suspended players, Riley and Hill, would remain suspended for the whole season, but would be allowed to rejoin practices and team activities on December 26.

== Schedule and results ==
Date time, TV	Rank^{#}	Opponent^{#}	Result	Record	High points	High rebounds	High assists	Site (attendance) city, state
Exhibition
November 1, 2017*; 7:00 pm, P12N	No. 21	Cal State Los Angeles	W 111–80	–	22 – Welsh	14 – Welsh	11 – Hands	Pauley Pavilion (4,408); Los Angeles, CA
Non-conference regular season
November 10, 2017*; 8:30 pm, ESPN	No. 21	vs. Georgia Tech; Pac-12 China Game	W 63–60	1–0	18 – Wilkes	8 – Welsh	7 – Holiday	Baoshan Sports Centre (4,011); Shanghai, China
November 15, 2017*; 8:00 pm, P12N	No. 23	Central Arkansas; Hall of Fame Classic campus-site game	W 106–101 ^{OT}	2–0	24 – Holiday	12 – Wilkes	6 – Hands	Pauley Pavilion (6,782); Los Angeles, CA
November 17, 2017*; 6:00 pm, P12N	No. 23	South Carolina State; Hall of Fame Classic campus-site game	W 96–68	3–0	22 – Hands	15 – Welsh	4 – Tied	Pauley Pavilion (7,035); Los Angeles, CA
November 20, 2017*; 4:00 pm, ESPNU	No. 23-t	vs. Creighton; Hall of Fame Classic semifinals	L 89–100	3–1	25 – Holiday	13 – Welsh	7 – Holiday	Sprint Center (10,234); Kansas City, MO
November 21, 2017*; 4:30 pm, ESPN3	No. 23-t	vs. Wisconsin; Hall of Fame Classic consolation	W 72–70	4–1	18 – Holiday	8 – Welsh	5 – Holiday	Sprint Center (10,160); Kansas City, MO
November 26, 2017*; 3:00 pm, P12N	No. 23-t	UC Irvine	W 87–63	5–1	21 – Ali	13 – Welsh	7 – Holiday	Pauley Pavilion (8,329); Los Angeles, CA
November 29, 2017*; 7:00 pm, P12N		Cal State Bakersfield	W 75–66	6–1	16 – Holiday	10 – Welsh	6 – Holiday	Pauley Pavilion (5,973); Los Angeles, CA
December 3, 2017*; 6:00 pm, P12N		Detroit	W 106–73	7–1	23 – Hands	9 – Tied	5 – Golomán	Pauley Pavilion (6,109); Los Angeles, CA
December 6, 2017*; 8:00 pm, P12N		Montana; Canceled due to Skirball Fire						Pauley Pavilion; Los Angeles, CA
December 9, 2017*; 9:00 am, CBS		at Michigan	L 69–78 ^{OT}	7–2	27 – Holiday	10 – Welsh	7 – Holiday	Crisler Center (12,137); Ann Arbor, MI
December 16, 2017*; 12:30 pm, CBS		No. 25 Cincinnati	L 63–77	7–3	17 – Holiday	9 – Welsh	4 – Welsh	Pauley Pavilion (10,018); Los Angeles, CA
December 19, 2017*; 6:00 pm, P12N		South Dakota	W 85–82	8–3	19 – Welsh	11 – Welsh	5 – Holiday	Pauley Pavilion (5,767); Los Angeles, CA
December 23, 2017*; 1:00 pm, CBS		vs. No. 7 Kentucky; CBS Sports Classic	W 83–75	9–3	20 – Tied	11 – Welsh	8 – Holiday	Smoothie King Center (8,119); New Orleans, LA
Pac-12 regular season
December 29, 2017; 8:00 pm, ESPN2		Washington State	W 96–82	10–3 (1–0)	33 – Holiday	14 – Welsh	4 – Tied	Pauley Pavilion (8,089); Los Angeles, CA
December 31, 2017; 5:00 pm, P12N		Washington	W 74–53	11–3 (2–0)	21 – Wilkes	12 – Welsh	5 – Holiday	Pauley Pavilion (7,639); Los Angeles, CA
January 4, 2018; 7:00 pm, FS1		at Stanford	L 99–107 ^{2OT}	11–4 (2–1)	31 – Holiday	10 – Welsh	3 – Tied	Maples Pavilion (4,497); Stanford, CA
January 6, 2018; 3:30 pm, P12N		at California	W 107–84	12–4 (3–1)	21 – Holiday	14 – Welsh	5 – Holiday	Haas Pavilion (8,888); Berkeley, CA
January 11, 2018; 8:00 pm, ESPN2		Utah	W 83–64	13–4 (4–1)	20 – Holiday	9 – Ali	6 – Holiday	Pauley Pavilion (8,739); Los Angeles, CA
January 13, 2018; 7:30 pm, P12N		Colorado	L 59–68	13–5 (4–2)	20 – Welsh	9 – Wilkes	4 – Holiday	Pauley Pavilion (10,164); Los Angeles, CA
January 18, 2018; 8:00 pm, FS1		at Oregon State	L 63–69	13–6 (4–3)	22 – Holiday	13 – Welsh	5 – Wilkes	Gill Coliseum (5,330); Corvallis, OR
January 20, 2018; 7:00 pm, ESPN		at Oregon	L 91–94	13–7 (4–4)	21 – Wilkes	10 – Welsh	5 – Holiday	Matthew Knight Arena (12,364); Eugene, OR
January 25, 2018; 7:30 pm, FS1		California	W 70–57	14–7 (5–4)	21 – Holiday	7 – Wilkes	6 – Holiday	Pauley Pavilion (8,028); Los Angeles, CA
January 27, 2018; 7:30 pm, P12N		Stanford	W 89–73	15–7 (6–4)	21 – Holiday	10 – Welsh	10 – Hands	Pauley Pavilion (10,519); Los Angeles, CA
February 3, 2018; 3:00 pm, ESPN2		USC; Rivalry	W 82–79	16–7 (7–4)	23 – Holiday	8 – Welsh	9 – Holiday	Pauley Pavilion (12,837); Los Angeles, CA
February 8, 2018; 7:00 pm, ESPN		at No. 13 Arizona; Rivalry	W 82–74	17–7 (8–4)	17 – Holiday	12 – Welsh	8 – Holiday	McKale Center (14,644); Tucson, AZ
February 10, 2018; 4:00 pm, P12N		at Arizona State	L 79–88	17–8 (8–5)	20 – Holiday	8 – Welsh	5 – Holiday	Wells Fargo Arena (14,025); Tempe, AZ
February 15, 2018; 8:00 pm, FS1		Oregon State	W 75–68	18–8 (9–5)	17 – Holiday	17 – Welsh	10 – Holiday	Pauley Pavilion (8,890); Los Angeles, CA
February 17, 2018; 7:15 pm, ESPN		Oregon	W 86–78 ^{OT}	19–8 (10–5)	29 – Holiday	14 – Welsh	6 – Holiday	Pauley Pavilion (13,001); Los Angeles, CA
February 22, 2018; 6:00 pm, ESPN		at Utah	L 78–84	19–9 (10–6)	23 – Holiday	7 – Tied	7 – Holiday	Jon M. Huntsman Center (13,141); Salt Lake City, UT
February 25, 2018; 1:00 pm, ESPNU		at Colorado	L 76–80	19–10 (10–7)	21 – Holiday	10 – Welsh	6 – Holiday	Coors Events Center (8,176); Boulder, CO
March 3, 2018; 7:15 pm, ESPN		at USC; Rivalry	W 83–72	20–10 (11–7)	34 – Holiday	9 – Tied	7 – Holiday	Galen Center (10,258); Los Angeles, CA
Pac-12 Tournament
March 8, 2018; 2:30 pm, P12N	(4)	vs. (5) Stanford; Quarterfinals	W 88–77	21–10	34 – Holiday	11 – Welsh	8 – Holiday	T-Mobile Arena (15,182); Paradise, NV
March 9, 2018; 6:00 pm, P12N	(4)	vs. (1) No. 15 Arizona; Semifinals	L 67–78 ^{OT}	21–11	17 – Welsh	17 – Welsh	3 – 3 tied	T-Mobile Arena (16,596); Paradise, NV
NCAA tournament
March 13, 2018*; 6:10 pm, truTV	(11 E)	vs. (11 E) St. Bonaventure; First Four	L 58–65	21–12	20 – Holiday	15 – Welsh	7 – Holiday	UD Arena (12,336); Dayton, OH
*Non-conference game. ^{#}Rankings from AP Poll. (#) Tournament seedings in parentheses. E=East. All times are in Pacific Time.

== Rankings ==
Ranking movements Legend: ██ Increase in ranking ██ Decrease in ranking — = Not ranked RV = Received votes т = Tied with team above or below
	Week																				
Poll	Pre	1	2	3	4	5	6	7	8	9	10	11	12	13	14	15	16	17	18	19	Final
AP	21	23	23-T	RV	RV	RV	RV	—	RV	RV											
Coaches	18	18	23	25	23	RV	RV	—	RV	RV											

*AP does not release post-NCAA Tournament rankings.

== Honors ==
=== Pac-12 Player of the Week ===
- Aaron Holiday (December 26)
- Aaron Holiday (February 19)
- Aaron Holiday (March 5)

=== Postseason awards ===
- Aaron Holiday, Third-team All-American - Sporting News
- Aaron Holiday, First-team All-Pac-12
- Aaron Holiday, Pac-12 All-Defensive Team
- Thomas Welsh, Second-team All-Pac-12

== See also ==
- List of UCLA Bruins in the NBA
