= 2017–18 Oregon State Beavers men's basketball team =

American college basketball season

2017–18 Oregon State Beavers men's basketball
- Conference: Pac-12 Conference
- Record: 16–16 (7–11 Pac-12)
- Head coach: Wayne Tinkle (4th season)
- Assistant coaches: Kerry Rupp; Gregg Gottlieb; Stephen Thompson
- Home arena: Gill Coliseum

2017–18 Pac-12 Conference men's basketball standings
	Conf.				Overall
Team	W		L	PCT	W		L	PCT
No. 12 Arizona †	14	–	4	.778	27	–	8	.771
USC	12	–	6	.667	24	–	12	.667
UCLA	11	–	7	.611	21	–	12	.636
Utah	11	–	7	.611	23	–	12	.657
Stanford	11	–	7	.611	19	–	16	.543
Oregon	10	–	8	.556	23	–	13	.639
Washington	10	–	8	.556	21	–	13	.618
Colorado	8	–	10	.444	17	–	15	.531
Arizona State	8	–	10	.444	20	–	12	.625
Oregon State	7	–	11	.389	16	–	16	.500
Washington State	4	–	14	.222	12	–	19	.387
California	2	–	16	.111	8	–	24	.250
† Pac-12 Tournament winner Rankings from AP poll

The 2017–18 Oregon State Beavers men's basketball team represented Oregon State University in the 2017–18 NCAA Division I men's basketball season. The Beavers were led by fourth-year head coach Wayne Tinkle, and played their home games at Gill Coliseum in Corvallis, Oregon as members of the Pac-12 Conference. They finished the season 16–16, 7–11 in Pac-12 play to finish in tenth place. They defeated Washington in the first round of the Pac-12 tournament before losing in the quarterfinals to USC.

== Previous season ==
The 2016–17 Beavers finished the 2016–17 season 5–27, 1–17 in the Pac-12 to finish last. They lost to California in the first round of the Pac-12 Tournament.

== Off-season ==
=== Departures ===
Name	Pos.	Height	Weight	Year	Hometown	Reason for departure
Matt Dahlen	F	6'6"	205	Jr.	Redmond, OR	Walk-on; would graduate and transfer
Daine Muller	G	6'4"	200	Jr.	Billings, MT	Retired due to injuries

=== Incoming transfers ===
Name	Pos.	Height	Weight	Year	Hometown	Notes
Seth Berger	F	6'8"	212	RS Sr.	Seattle, WA	Graduate transfer from UMass
Kylor Kelley	C	7'1"	210	RS Jr.	Gervais, OR	Transfer who last played for Northwest Christian University

=== 2017 recruiting class ===
College recruiting
Name	Hometown	School	Height	Weight	Commit date
Ethan Thompson; G	Los Angeles, CA	Bishop Montgomery HS	6 ft 4.5 in (1.94 m)	173 lb (78 kg)	Sep 19, 2016
Ethan Thompson; G	Recruit ratings: Scout: Rivals: 247Sports: ESPN: (88)				
Zach Reichle; G	Wilsonville, OR	Wilsonville HS	6 ft 4.5 in (1.94 m)	186 lb (84 kg)	Oct 18, 2016
Zach Reichle; G	Recruit ratings: Scout: Rivals: 247Sports: ESPN: (76)				
Alfred Hollins; F	San Francisco, CA	Hillcrest Prep Academy (AZ)	6 ft 5.5 in (1.97 m)	189 lb (86 kg)	Mar 21, 2017
Alfred Hollins; F	Recruit ratings: Scout: Rivals: 247Sports: ESPN: (81)				
Xavier Smith; SG	Seattle, WA	O'Dea HS	6 ft 4 in (1.93 m)	175 lb (79 kg)	May 9, 2017
Xavier Smith; SG	Recruit ratings: Scout: Rivals: 247Sports: ESPN: (72)				
Overall recruit ranking:
Note: In many cases, Scout, Rivals, 247Sports, On3, and ESPN may conflict in their listings of height and weight.; In these cases, the average was taken. ESPN grades are on a 100-point scale.; Sources:

== Roster ==
2017–18 Oregon State Beavers men's basketball team
Players
Coaches

Pos.	#	Name	Height	Weight	Year	Previous school	Hometown
G	1	Stephen Thompson Jr.	6 ft 4 in (1.93 m)	190 lb (86 kg)	Jr	Bishop Montgomery HS	Los Angeles, California
G	2	Ronnie Stacy	6 ft 4 in (1.93 m)	200 lb (91 kg)	Sr	Tyler Junior College	Alexander City, Alabama
F	3	Tres Tinkle	6 ft 8 in (2.03 m)	220 lb (100 kg)	RS So	Hellgate HS	Missoula, Montana
F	4	Alfred Hollins	6 ft 6 in (1.98 m)	195 lb (88 kg)	Fr	Hillcrest Prep	San Francisco, California
G	5	Ethan Thompson	6 ft 5 in (1.96 m)	190 lb (86 kg)	Fr	Bishop Montgomery HS	Los Angeles, California
G	11	Zach Reichle	6 ft 5 in (1.96 m)	195 lb (88 kg)	Fr	Wilsonville HS	Wilsonville, Oregon
F	12	Drew Eubanks	6 ft 10 in (2.08 m)	250 lb (113 kg)	Jr	Reynolds HS	Troutdale, Oregon
G	15	Tanner Sanders (W)	6 ft 5 in (1.96 m)	210 lb (95 kg)	RS Jr	Crescent Valley HS	Corvallis, Oregon
G	22	Xavier Smith (W)	6 ft 4 in (1.93 m)	180 lb (82 kg)	Fr	O'Dea High School	Seattle, Washington
C	23	Gligorije Rakocevic	6 ft 11 in (2.11 m)	255 lb (116 kg)	Jr	Cantwell-Sacred Heart of Mary HS	Bijelo Polje, Montenegro
G	24	Kendal Manuel	6 ft 4 in (1.93 m)	190 lb (86 kg)	RS So	Skyview HS	Billings, Montana
C	31	Cheikh N'diaye	7 ft 0 in (2.13 m)	240 lb (109 kg)	RS Sr	Army and Navy Academy	Dakar, Senegal
F	32	Seth Berger	6 ft 8 in (2.03 m)	215 lb (98 kg)	RS Sr	UMass	Seattle, Washington
F	34	Ben Koné	6 ft 8 in (2.03 m)	235 lb (107 kg)	So	Archbishop Mitty HS	San Jose, California
F	44	Isaac Barnes (W)	6 ft 8 in (2.03 m)	225 lb (102 kg)	Fr	North Allegheny HS	Pittsburgh, Pennsylvania

Head coach

- Wayne Tinkle (Montana)

Assistant coach(es)

- Kerry Rupp (Southern Utah)
- Gregg Gottlieb (UCLA)
- Stephen Thompson (Syracuse)

Legend

- (C) Team captain
- (S) Suspended
- (I) Ineligible
- (W) Walk-on
- Injured
- Current redshirt

Roster
Last update: July 22, 2017

- Sophomore guard JaQuori McLaughlin elected to transfer after seven games into the season.

=== Depth chart ===
Pos.	Starting 5	Bench 1	Bench 2	Bench 3
C	Drew Eubanks	Gligorije Rakocevic	Cheikh N'diaye
PF	Seth Berger		Ben Koné	Isaac Barnes
SF	Tres Tinkle	Alred Hollins	Ronnie Stacy
SG	Ethan Thompson	Zach Reichle		Tanner Sanders
PG	Stephen Thompson Jr.	Kendal Manuel		Xavier Smith

== Schedule and results ==
Date time, TV	Rank^{#}	Opponent^{#}	Result	Record	High points	High rebounds	High assists	Site (attendance) city, state
Exhibition
Nov 3, 2017*; 7:00 pm, P12N		Pacific (OR)	W 91–69	–	21 – Thompson Jr.	8 – Tinkle	3 – 6 tied	Gill Coliseum (4,192); Corvallis, OR
Non-conference regular season
Nov 10, 2017*; 7:00 pm, P12N		Southern Utah	W 99–82	1–0	24 – Tinkle	8 – E. Thompson	5 – Tied	Gill Coliseum (4,588); Corvallis, OR
Nov 13, 2017*; 8:00 pm, P12N		Wyoming	L 66–75	1–1	20 – Tinkle	14 – Tinkle	4 – Tied	Gill Coliseum (3,874); Corvallis, OR
Nov 18, 2017*; 8:00 pm, P12N		Long Beach State	W 89–81	2–1	26 – Eubanks	11 – Eubanks	5 – Tied	Gill Coliseum (5,438); Corvallis, OR
Nov 23, 2017*; 11:00 am, ESPNU		vs. St. John's; AdvoCare Invitational quarterfinals	L 77–82	2–2	22 – Thompson Jr.	9 – Eubanks	5 – Tinkle	HP Field House (2,712); Lake Buena Vista, FL
Nov 24, 2017*; 10:00 am, ESPN3		vs. Long Beach State; AdvoCare Invitational 2nd round consolation	L 69–74	2–3	24 – Thompson Jr.	10 – Tinkle	5 – McLaughlin	HP Field House (2,367); Lake Buena Vista, FL
Nov 26, 2017*; 4:00 pm, ESPN3		vs. Marist; AdvoCare Invitational 7th place game	W 65–46	3–3	16 – Tinkle	9 – Thompson Jr.	4 – Tied	HP Field House (2,591); Lake Buena Vista, FL
Dec 2, 2017*; 2:00 pm, P12N		Loyola Marymount	W 78–74	4–3	22 – Eubanks	7 – Tinkle	7 – Tinkle	Gill Coliseum (3,985); Corvallis, OR
Dec 5, 2017*; 7:00 pm, P12N		Eastern Kentucky	W 74–62	5–3	26 – Thompson Jr.	8 – Tinkle	6 – Thompson Jr.	Gill Coliseum (3,571); Corvallis, OR
Dec 9, 2017*; 7:00 pm, P12N		Arkansas–Pine Bluff	W 85–58	6–3	19 – Eubanks	5 – E. Thompson	8 – Thompson Jr.	Gill Coliseum (4,344); Corvallis, OR
Dec 12, 2017*; 7:00 pm, P12N		Jacksonville State	W 70–69	7–3	18 – Thompson Jr.	11 – Eubanks	5 – Tied	Gill Coliseum (3,900); Corvallis, OR
Dec 16, 2017*; 7:30 pm, P12N		vs. Saint Louis; Dam City Classic	W 63–60	8–3	16 – Tinkle	8 – Tinkle	5 – Thompson Jr.	Moda Center (8,110); Portland, OR
Dec 21, 2017*; 4:00 pm, ESPN3		at Kent State	L 78–79	8–4	25 – Tied	9 – Tinkle	3 – Tied	MAC Center (3,279); Kent, OH
Pac-12 regular season
Dec 29, 2017; 8:00 pm, ESPNU		Colorado	W 76–57	9–4 (1–0)	24 – Thompson Jr.	9 – Eubanks	6 – Tinkle	Gill Coliseum (4,481); Corvallis, OR
Dec 31, 2017; 3:00 pm, P12N		Utah	L 64–66	9–5 (1–1)	14 – Tinkle	5 – Tied	5 – Tinkle	Gill Coliseum (4,751); Corvallis, OR
Jan 5, 2018; 7:00 pm, FS1		Oregon; Civil War	W 76–64	10–5 (2–1)	19 – Tinkle	12 – Tinkle	6 – Thompson Jr.	Gill Coliseum (6,482); Corvallis, OR
Jan 11, 2018; 6:00 pm, P12N		at No. 17 Arizona	L 53–62	10–6 (2–2)	18 – Tinkle	9 – Tinkle	2 – 3 tied	McKale Center (14,644); Tucson, AZ
Jan 13, 2018; 3:00 pm, P12N		at No. 11 Arizona State	L 75–77	10–7 (2–3)	21 – Thompson Jr.	10 – Tinkle	7 – E. Thompson	Wells Fargo Arena (13,459); Tempe, AZ
Jan 18, 2018; 8:00 pm, FS1		UCLA	W 69–63	11–7 (3–3)	16 – Tinkle	7 – Eubanks	3 – 3 tied	Gill Coliseum (5,330); Corvallis, OR
Jan 20, 2018; 5:00 pm, P12N		USC	L 67–74	11–8 (3–4)	21 – Tinkle	7 – Tied	6 – Berger	Gill Coliseum (6,301); Corvallis, OR
Jan 27, 2018; 5:00 pm, P12N		at Oregon; Civil War	L 57–66	11–9 (3–5)	16 – Thompson Jr.	9 – Eubanks	5 – Tinkle	Matthew Knight Arena (12,364); Eugene, OR
Feb 1, 2018; 8:00 pm, FS1		at Stanford	L 71–80	11–10 (3–6)	19 – Eubanks	6 – Eubanks	5 – E. Thompson	Maples Pavilion (3,601); Stanford, CA
Feb 3, 2018; 5:00 pm, P12N		at California	L 70–74	11–11 (3–7)	24 – Thompson Jr.	8 – Eubanks	6 – E. Thompson	Haas Pavilion (8,581); Berkeley, CA
Feb 8, 2018; 7:30 pm, P12N		Washington State	W 94–62	12–11 (4–7)	20 – Tinkle	10 – Eubanks	6 – E. Thompson	Gill Coliseum (4,235); Corvallis, OR
Feb 10, 2018; 7:00 pm, ESPNU		Washington	W 97–94 ^{2OT}	13–11 (5–7)	29 – Tinkle	13 – Eubanks	8 – Tinkle	Gill Coliseum (5,630); Corvallis, OR
Feb 15, 2018; 8:00 pm, FS1		at UCLA	L 68–75	13–12 (5–8)	24 – Hollins	9 – Eubanks	7 – Tinkle	Pauley Pavilion (8,890); Los Angeles, CA
Feb 17, 2018; 8:00 pm, FS1		at USC	L 59–72	13–13 (5–9)	16 – Tied	10 – Tinkle	6 – Thompson Jr.	Galen Center (4,542); Los Angeles, CA
Feb 22, 2018; 6:00 pm, FS1		No. 14 Arizona	L 65–75 ^{OT}	13–14 (5–10)	20 – E. Thompson	8 – E. Thompson	6 – Tinkle	Gill Coliseum (4,963); Corvallis, OR
Feb 24, 2018; 5:00 pm, ESPNU		Arizona State	W 79–75	14–14 (6–10)	16 – Eubanks	8 – 2 tied	8 – Tinkle	Gill Coliseum (6,147); Corvallis, OR
Mar 1, 2018; 8:00 pm, ESPN2		at Washington	L 77–79	14–15 (6–11)	22 – Tinkle	7 – 2 tied	3 – E. Thompson	Alaska Airlines Arena (6,480); Seattle, WA
Mar 3, 2018; 3:30 pm, P12N		at Washington State	W 92–67	15–15 (7–11)	23 – E. Thompson	12 – Tinkle	6 – E. Thompson	Beasley Coliseum (3,148); Pullman, WA
Pac-12 tournament
Mar 7, 2018; 6:00 pm, P12N	(10)	vs. (7) Washington; First round	W 69–66 ^{OT}	16–15	19 – Eubanks	10 – Tinkle	4 – Thompson	T-Mobile Arena (10,458); Paradise, NV
Mar 8, 2018; 6:00 pm, P12N	(10)	vs. (2) USC; Quarterfinals	L 48–61	16–16	12 – Thompson Jr.	9 – Eubanks	5 – Thompson	T-Mobile Arena (13,194); Paradise, NV
*Non-conference game. ^{#}Rankings from AP Poll. (#) Tournament seedings in parentheses. All times are in Pacific Time.
