= 2017–18 Stanford Cardinal men's basketball team =

American college basketball season

2017–18 Stanford Cardinal men's basketball

NIT, Second Round
- Conference: Pac-12 Conference
- Record: 19–16 (11–7 Pac-12)
- Head coach: Jerod Haase (2nd season)
- Assistant coaches: Jeff Wulbrun; Adam Cohen; Jesse Pruitt
- Home arena: Maples Pavilion

2017–18 Pac-12 Conference men's basketball standings
	Conf.				Overall
Team	W		L	PCT	W		L	PCT
No. 12 Arizona †	14	–	4	.778	27	–	8	.771
USC	12	–	6	.667	24	–	12	.667
UCLA	11	–	7	.611	21	–	12	.636
Utah	11	–	7	.611	23	–	12	.657
Stanford	11	–	7	.611	19	–	16	.543
Oregon	10	–	8	.556	23	–	13	.639
Washington	10	–	8	.556	21	–	13	.618
Colorado	8	–	10	.444	17	–	15	.531
Arizona State	8	–	10	.444	20	–	12	.625
Oregon State	7	–	11	.389	16	–	16	.500
Washington State	4	–	14	.222	12	–	19	.387
California	2	–	16	.111	8	–	24	.250
† Pac-12 Tournament winner Rankings from AP poll

The 2017–18 Stanford Cardinal men's basketball team represented Stanford University during the 2017–18 NCAA Division I men's basketball season. The Cardinal, led by second-year head coach Jerod Haase, played their home games at Maples Pavilion as members of the Pac-12 Conference. They finished the season 19–16, 11–7 in Pac-12 play, finishing in a three-way tie for third place. As the No. 5 seed in the Pac-12 tournament, they defeated California in the first round before losing to UCLA in the quarterfinals. They received an invitation to the National Invitation Tournament where they defeated BYU in the first round before losing to Oklahoma State in the second round.

== Previous season ==
The Cardinal finished the 2016–17 season 14–17, 6–12 in Pac-12 play to finish in ninth place. They lost in the first round of the Pac-12 tournament to Arizona State.

== Offseason ==
=== Departures ===
Name	Pos.	Height	Weight	Year	Hometown	Reason for departure
Christian Sanders	SG	6'4"	192	RS Senior	Houston, TX	Graduated
Grant Verhoeven	PF	6'9"	250	RS Senior	Hanford, CA	Graduated
Marcus Allen	G	6'3"	190	Senior	Las Vegas, NV	Graduated
Malcolm Allen	G	6'1"	180	RS Junior	Las Vegas, NV	Graduate transferred to Northern Arizona

=== 2017 recruiting class ===
College recruiting information
Name	Hometown	School	Height	Weight	Commit date
KZ Okpala; SF	Placentia, California	Esperanza High School	6 ft 7 in (2.01 m)	187.5 lb (85.0 kg)	Aug 7, 2016
KZ Okpala; SF	Recruit ratings: Scout: Rivals: 247Sports: ESPN: (88)				
Oscar Da Silva; F	Munich, Germany	Ludwig Gymnasium	6 ft 9 in (2.06 m)	218 lb (99 kg)	Nov 16, 2016
Oscar Da Silva; F	Recruit ratings: Scout: Rivals: 247Sports: ESPN: (NR)				
Daejon Davis; G	Seattle, Washington	Garfield High School	6 ft 3 in (1.91 m)	170 lb (77 kg)	Apr 1, 2017
Daejon Davis; G	Recruit ratings: Scout: Rivals: 247Sports: ESPN: (86)				
Isaac White; G	Adelaide, South Australia	Sacred Heart College	6 ft 1 in (1.85 m)	182 lb (83 kg)	Apr 12, 2017
Isaac White; G	Recruit ratings: Rivals: 247Sports: ESPN: (NR)				
Overall recruit ranking:
Note: In many cases, Scout, Rivals, 247Sports, On3, and ESPN may conflict in their listings of height and weight.; In these cases, the average was taken. ESPN grades are on a 100-point scale.; Sources: "2017 Stanford Basketball Commitment List". Rivals.; "2017 Stanford Cardinal Player Commits". ESPN.; "2017 Team Ranking". Rivals.

=== 2018 recruiting class ===
College recruiting information (2018)
Name	Hometown	School	Height	Weight	Commit date
Cormac Ryan; SG	New York City, New York	Milton Academy	6 ft 5 in (1.96 m)	175 lb (79 kg)	Jun 4, 2017
Cormac Ryan; SG	Recruit ratings: Scout: Rivals: 247Sports: ESPN:				
Jaiden Delaire; SF	Granby, Connecticut	Loomis Chaffee School	6 ft 9 in (2.06 m)	200 lb (91 kg)	Aug 8, 2018
Jaiden Delaire; SF	Recruit ratings: Scout: Rivals: 247Sports: ESPN:				
Keenan Fitzmorris; C	Lenexa, Kansas	St. James Academy	6 ft 11 in (2.11 m)	190 lb (86 kg)	Jul 3, 2017
Keenan Fitzmorris; C	Recruit ratings: Scout: Rivals: 247Sports: ESPN:				
Bryce Wills; SG	White Plains, New York	Iona Preparatory School	6 ft 5 in (1.96 m)	170 lb (77 kg)	Dec 20, 2017
Bryce Wills; SG	Recruit ratings: Scout: Rivals: 247Sports: ESPN:				
Lukas Kisunas; C	Lithuania	Brewster Academy	6 ft 8 in (2.03 m)	235 lb (107 kg)	May 1, 2018
Lukas Kisunas; C	Recruit ratings: Scout: Rivals: 247Sports: ESPN:				
Overall recruit ranking:
Note: In many cases, Scout, Rivals, 247Sports, On3, and ESPN may conflict in their listings of height and weight.; In these cases, the average was taken. ESPN grades are on a 100-point scale.; Sources: "2018 Stanford Commits". Rivals.; "2018 Team Ranking". Rivals.

== Roster ==
2017–18 Stanford Cardinal men's basketball team
Players
Coaches

Pos.	#	Name	Height	Weight	Year	Previous school	Hometown
F	0	KZ Okpala	6 ft 8 in (2.03 m)	195 lb (88 kg)	Fr	Esperanza HS	Orange County, California
G	1	Daejon Davis	6 ft 3 in (1.91 m)	175 lb (79 kg)	Fr	Garfield HS	Seattle, Washington
G	2	Robert Cartwright	6 ft 2 in (1.88 m)	180 lb (82 kg)	RS Jr	Flintridge Prep	Pasadena, California
G	4	Isaac White	6 ft 1 in (1.85 m)	185 lb (84 kg)	Fr	Sacred Heart College	Adelaide, South Australia
F	5	Kodye Pugh	6 ft 8 in (2.03 m)	205 lb (93 kg)	RS Fr	Blair Academy	Baltimore, Maryland
F	10	Michael Humphrey	6 ft 9 in (2.06 m)	245 lb (111 kg)	Sr	Sunnyslope HS	Phoenix, Arizona
G/F	11	Dorian Pickens	6 ft 5 in (1.96 m)	215 lb (98 kg)	Sr	Pinnacle HS	Phoenix, Arizona
F	13	Oscar da Silva	6 ft 9 in (2.06 m)	210 lb (95 kg)	Fr	Ludwig Gymnasium	Munich, Germany
G/F	14	Marcus Sheffield (injured)	6 ft 5 in (1.96 m)	180 lb (82 kg)	Jr	Chattahoochee HS	Alpharetta, Georgia
G	15	Rodney Herenton (W)	6 ft 1 in (1.85 m)	155 lb (70 kg)	So	Stevenson HS	Chicago, Illinois
C	20	Josh Sharma	7 ft 0 in (2.13 m)	220 lb (100 kg)	Jr	Northfield Mount Hermon	Lexington, Massachusetts
F	21	Cameron Walker	6 ft 7 in (2.01 m)	200 lb (91 kg)	Jr	Righetti HS	Santa Maria, California
F	22	Reid Travis	6 ft 8 in (2.03 m)	245 lb (111 kg)	RS Jr	DeLaSalle HS	Minneapolis, Minnesota
G	25	Blake Pagon (W)	6 ft 4 in (1.93 m)	190 lb (86 kg)	So	Battlefield HS	Haymarket, Virginia
F	33	Trevor Stanback	6 ft 11 in (2.11 m)	220 lb (100 kg)	So	Maranatha HS	Pasadena, California

Head coach

- Jerod Haase (Kansas)

Assistant coach(es)

- Jeff Wulbrun (Cal State Fullerton)
- Adam Cohen (Arizona)
- Jesse Pruitt (UC Davis)

Legend

- (C) Team captain
- (S) Suspended
- (I) Ineligible
- (W) Walk-on
- Injured
- Current redshirt

Roster
Last update: October 6, 2017

== Schedule and results ==
Date time, TV	Rank^{#}	Opponent^{#}	Result	Record	Site (attendance) city, state
Exhibition
Nov 2, 2017*; 7:00 pm, P12N		Chico State	W 91–81	–	Maples Pavilion (N/A); Stanford, CA
Non-conference regular season
Nov 10, 2017*; 4:00 pm, P12N		Cal Poly	W 78–62	1–0	Maples Pavilion (6,276); Stanford, CA
Nov 12, 2017*; 7:00 pm, P12N		Pacific	W 89–80	2–0	Maples Pavilion (3,103); Stanford, CA
Nov 14, 2017*; 8:00 pm, P12N		Eastern Washington	L 61–67	2–1	Maples Paviliion (2,799); Stanford, CA
Nov 17, 2017*; 3:00 pm, P12N		Northeastern; PK80–Phil Knight Invitational campus–site game	W 73–59	3–1	Maples Pavilion (2,998); Stanford, CA
Nov 20, 2017*; 8:30 pm, ESPN2		No. 9 North Carolina	L 72–96	3–2	Maples Pavilion (7,233); Stanford, CA
Nov 23, 2017*; 7:00 pm, ESPN2		vs. No. 7 Florida; PK80–Phil Knight Invitational - Motion quarterfinals	L 87–108	3–3	Veterans Memorial Coliseum (7,878); Portland, OR
Nov 24, 2017*; 6:00 pm, ESPN2		vs. Ohio State; PK80–Phil Knight Invitational - Motion consolation 2nd round	L 71–79	3–4	Moda Center (14,274); Portland, OR
Nov 26, 2017*; 6:30 pm, ESPNU		vs. Portland State; PK80–Phil Knight Invitational - Motion 7th place game	L 78–87	3–5	Veterans Memorial Coliseum (2,771); Portland, OR
Nov 29, 2017*; 7:00 pm, P12N		Montana	W 70–54	4–5	Maples Pavilion (3,145); Stanford, CA
Dec 3, 2017*; 2:00 pm		at Long Beach State	L 68–76	4–6	Walter Pyramid (2,564); Long Beach, CA
Dec 15, 2017*; 7:00 pm, P12N		Denver	W 75–62	5–6	Maples Pavilion (3,303); Stanford, CA
Dec 17, 2017*; 3:00 pm, ESPNU		San Francisco	W 71–59	6–6	Maples Pavilion (4,031); Stanford, CA
Dec 21, 2017*; 8:00 pm, ESPN2		vs. No. 14 Kansas; Sacramento Showcase	L 54–75	6–7	Golden 1 Center (7,880); Sacramento, CA
Pac-12 Regular season
Dec 30, 2017; 7:00 pm, FS1		California	L 74–77	6–8 (0–1)	Maples Pavilion (4,293); Stanford, CA
Jan 4, 2018; 7:00 pm, FS1		UCLA	W 107–99 ^{2OT}	7–8 (1–1)	Maples Pavilion (4,497); Stanford, CA
Jan 7, 2018; 7:00 pm, FS1		USC	W 77–76	8–8 (2–1)	Maples Pavilion (4,087); Stanford, CA
Jan 11, 2018; 6:00 pm, ESPNU		at Washington State	W 79–70	9–8 (3–1)	Beasley Coliseum (2,540); Pullman, WA
Jan 13, 2018; 5:00 pm, P12N		at Washington	W 73–64	10–8 (4–1)	Alaska Airlines Arena (8,256); Seattle, WA
Jan 17, 2018; 8:00 pm, P12N		No. 16 Arizona State	W 86–77	11–8 (5–1)	Maples Pavilion (4,014); Stanford, CA
Jan 20, 2018; 1:00 pm, CBS		No. 14 Arizona	L 71–73	11–9 (5–2)	Maples Pavilion (6,079); Stanford, CA
Jan 24, 2018; 6:00 pm, ESPNU		at USC	L 64–69	11–10 (5–3)	Galen Center (4,116); Los Angeles, CA
Jan 27, 2018; 7:30 pm, P12N		at UCLA	L 73–89	11–11 (5–4)	Pauley Pavilion (10,519); Los Angeles, CA
Feb 1, 2018; 8:00 pm, FS1		Oregon State	W 80–71	12–11 (6–4)	Maples Pavilion (3,601); Stanford, CA
Feb 3, 2018; 2:00 pm, FOX		Oregon	W 96–61	13–11 (7–4)	Maples Pavilion (4,894); Stanford, CA
Feb 8, 2018; 5:00 pm, FS1		at Utah	L 60–75	13–12 (7–5)	Jon M. Huntsman Center (14,038); Salt Lake City, UT
Feb 11, 2018; 1:00 pm, P12N		at Colorado	L 56–64	13–13 (7–6)	Coors Events Center (8,323); Boulder, CO
Feb 18, 2018; 5:00 pm, ESPNU		at California	W 77–73	14–13 (8–6)	Haas Pavilion (8,482); Berkeley, CA
Feb 22, 2018; 6:00 pm, P12N		Washington	W 94–78	15–13 (9–6)	Maples Pavilion (3,625); Stanford, CA
Feb 24, 2018; 4:00 pm, P12N		Washington State	W 86–84	16–13 (10–6)	Maples Pavilion (7,391); Stanford, CA
Mar 1, 2018; 7:00 pm, FS1		at No. 19 Arizona	L 67–75	16–14 (10–7)	McKale Center (14,644); Tucson, AZ
Mar 3, 2018; 11:30 am, P12N		at Arizona State	W 84–83	17–14 (11–7)	Wells Fargo Arena (11,895); Tempe, AZ
Pac-12 Tournament
Mar 7, 2018; 2:30 pm, P12N	(5)	vs. (12) California; First Round	W 76–58	18–14	T-Mobile Arena (8,619); Paradise, NV
Mar 8, 2018; 2:30 pm, P12N	(5)	vs. (4) UCLA; Quarterfinals	L 77–88	18–15	T-Mobile Arena (15,182); Paradise, NV
NIT
Mar 14, 2018*; 7:00 pm, ESPNU	(3)	(6) BYU; First Round – USC Bracket	W 86–83	19–15	Maples Pavilion (1,839); Stanford, CA
Mar 19, 2018*; 4:00 pm, ESPNU	(3)	at (2) Oklahoma State; Second Round – USC Bracket	L 65–71	19–16	Gallagher-Iba Arena (9,635); Stillwater, OK
*Non-conference game. ^{#}Rankings from AP Poll. (#) Tournament seedings in parentheses. All times are in Pacific Time.
