= 2017–18 Washington State Cougars men's basketball team =

American college basketball season

2017–18 Washington State Cougars men's basketball

Wooden Legacy Champions
- Conference: Pac-12 Conference
- Record: 12–19 (4–14 Pac-12)
- Head coach: Ernie Kent (4th season)
- Assistant coaches: Curtis Allen; Ed Haskins; Bennie Seltzer
- Home arena: Beasley Coliseum

2017–18 Pac-12 Conference men's basketball standings
	Conf.				Overall
Team	W		L	PCT	W		L	PCT
No. 12 Arizona †	14	–	4	.778	27	–	8	.771
USC	12	–	6	.667	24	–	12	.667
UCLA	11	–	7	.611	21	–	12	.636
Utah	11	–	7	.611	23	–	12	.657
Stanford	11	–	7	.611	19	–	16	.543
Oregon	10	–	8	.556	23	–	13	.639
Washington	10	–	8	.556	21	–	13	.618
Colorado	8	–	10	.444	17	–	15	.531
Arizona State	8	–	10	.444	20	–	12	.625
Oregon State	7	–	11	.389	16	–	16	.500
Washington State	4	–	14	.222	12	–	19	.387
California	2	–	16	.111	8	–	24	.250
† Pac-12 Tournament winner Rankings from AP poll

The 2017–18 Washington State Cougars men's basketball team represented Washington State University during the 2017–18 NCAA Division I men's basketball season. The team was led by fourth-year head coach Ernie Kent. The Cougars played their home games at the Beasley Coliseum in Pullman, Washington as members of the Pac-12 Conference. They finished the season 12–19, 4–14 in Pac-12 play to finish in 11th place. They lost in the first round of the Pac-12 tournament to Oregon.

== Previous season ==
The Cougars finished the 2016–17 season 13–18, 6–12 in Pac-12 play to finish in a tie for ninth place. They lost in the first round of the Pac-12 tournament to Colorado.

== Offseason ==
=== Departures ===
Name	Num	Pos.	Height	Weight	Year	Hometown	Reason for departure
Derien King	0	F	6'6"	185	Junior	Wichita, KS	Graduate transferred to Angelo State
Ike Iroegbu	2	G	6'2"	195	Senior	Elk Grove, CA	Graduated
Charles Callison	23	G	6'0"	185	Senior	Moreno Valley, CA	Graduated
Josh Hawkinson	24	F	6'10"	230	Senior	Shoreline, WA	Graduated
Conor Clifford	42	C	7'0"	260	Senior	Huntington Beach, CA	Graduated

=== Incoming transfers ===
Name	Number	Pos.	Height	Weight	Year	Hometown	Notes
Davante Cooper	32	C	6'10"	230	Sophomore	Atlanta, GA	Junior college, transferred from Tyler Junior College
Kwinton Hinson	40	F	6'5"	175	Junior	Fairmont, NC	Junior college, transferred from Tyler Junior College
Drick Bernstine	43	F	6'8"	220	RS senior	Aurora, CO	Transferred from North Dakota. Was eligible to play immediately, since he graduated from North Dakota.

=== 2017 recruiting class ===
College recruiting
Name	Hometown	School	Height	Weight	Commit date
Roberto Gittens; SF	Tacoma, WA	Henry Foss HS	6 ft 5 in (1.96 m)	180 lb (82 kg)	May 1, 2017
Roberto Gittens; SF	Recruit ratings: Scout: Rivals: 247Sports:				
Overall recruit ranking:
Note: In many cases, Scout, Rivals, 247Sports, On3, and ESPN may conflict in their listings of height and weight.; In these cases, the average was taken. ESPN grades are on a 100-point scale.; Sources: "2017 Washington St. Basketball Commitment List". Rivals.; "2017 Washington State Cougars Basketball Commits". ESPN.; "2017 Team Ranking". Rivals.

== Future recruits ==
=== 2018–19 team recruits ===
College recruiting (2018)
Name	Hometown	School	Height	Weight	Commit date
C. J. Elleby; SF	Seattle, WA	Cleveland High School	6 ft 6 in (1.98 m)	180 lb (82 kg)	Sep 9, 2017
C. J. Elleby; SF	Recruit ratings: Scout: Rivals: 247Sports: ESPN:				
Overall recruit ranking:
Note: In many cases, Scout, Rivals, 247Sports, On3, and ESPN may conflict in their listings of height and weight.; In these cases, the average was taken. ESPN grades are on a 100-point scale.; Sources: "2018 Team Ranking". Rivals.

== Roster ==
2017–18 Washington State Cougars men's basketball team
Players
Coaches

Pos.	#	Name	Height	Weight	Year	Previous school	Hometown
G	1	Jamar Ergas	6 ft 3 in (1.91 m)	182 lb (83 kg)	RS Fr	Elite 1 Academy	Toronto, ON
G	2	T. J. Mickelson (W)	6 ft 1 in (1.85 m)	160 lb (73 kg)	Fr	Capital HS	Olympia, WA
F	3	Robert Franks	6 ft 7 in (2.01 m)	240 lb (109 kg)	Jr	Evergreen HS	Vancouver, WA
G	4	Viont'e Daniels	6 ft 2 in (1.88 m)	175 lb (79 kg)	Jr	Federal Way HS	Federal Way, WA
G	5	Milan Acquaah	6 ft 3 in (1.91 m)	185 lb (84 kg)	RS Fr	Cathedral HS	Pasadena, CA
G	10	K. J. Langston	6 ft 4 in (1.93 m)	185 lb (84 kg)	RS Jr	Chabot College	Chicago, IL
G	12	Steven Shpreyregin (W)	6 ft 1 in (1.85 m)	180 lb (82 kg)	Sr	Skagit Valley College	Seattle, WA
F	13	Jeff Pollard	6 ft 9 in (2.06 m)	240 lb (109 kg)	So	Impact Academy	Bountiful, UT
G	22	Malachi Flynn	6 ft 1 in (1.85 m)	170 lb (77 kg)	So	Bellarmine Prep	Tacoma, WA
F	25	Arinze Chidom (W)	6 ft 9 in (2.06 m)	200 lb (91 kg)	RS Fr	Bishop O'Dowd HS	Oakland, CA
F	32	Davante Cooper	6 ft 11 in (2.11 m)	233 lb (106 kg)	Jr	Tyler Junior College	Atlanta, GA
G	35	Carter Skaggs	6 ft 5 in (1.96 m)	216 lb (98 kg)	So	Chipola College	Logansport, IN
G	40	Kwinton Hinton	6 ft 4 in (1.93 m)	215 lb (98 kg)	Jr	Tyler Junior College	Fairmont, GA
F	43	Drick Bernstine	6 ft 8 in (2.03 m)	220 lb (100 kg)	RS Sr	North Dakota	Aurora, CO

Head coach

- Ernie Kent (Oregon)

Assistant coach(es)

- Curtis Allen (Washington)
- Ed Haskins (Eastern Washington)
- Bennie Seltzer (Washington State)

Legend

- (C) Team captain
- (S) Suspended
- (I) Ineligible
- (W) Walk-on
- Injured
- Current redshirt

Roster

== Schedule and results ==
Date time, TV	Rank^{#}	Opponent^{#}	Result	Record	Site (attendance) city, state
Exhibition
Nov 5, 2017*; 1:00 pm		Saint Martin's	W 85–74	–	Beasley Coliseum (1,213); Pullman, WA
Non-conference regular season
Nov 12, 2017*; 1:00 pm, P12N		Texas Southern	W 86–84 ^{OT}	1–0	Beasley Coliseum (2,424); Pullman, WA
Nov 15, 2017*; 6:00 pm, P12N		Seattle	W 75–59	2–0	Beasley Coliseum (2,340); Pullman, WA
Nov 18, 2017*; 1:30 pm, P12N		Idaho State	W 83–62	3–0	Beasley Coliseum (2,129); Pullman, WA
Nov 23, 2017*; 3:30 pm, ESPN3		vs. Saint Joseph's; Wooden Legacy quarterfinals	W 75–71	4–0	Titan Gym (2,131); Fullerton, CA
Nov 24, 2017*; 10:30 am, ESPNews		vs. No. 21 Saint Mary's; Wooden Legacy semifinals	W 84–79	5–0	Titan Gym (2,513); Fullerton, CA
Nov 26, 2017*; 9:00 pm, ESPN2		vs. San Diego State; Wooden Legacy championship	W 93–86	6–0	Titan Gym (1,733); Fullerton, CA
Dec 2, 2017*; 12:00 pm, P12N		UC Davis	L 67–81	6–1	Beasley Coliseum (3,183); Pullman, WA
Dec 6, 2017*; 7:00 pm, SWX		at Idaho; Battle of the Palouse	L 64–91	6–2	Cowan Spectrum (4,329); Moscow, ID
Dec 9, 2017*; 6:00 pm, Stadium		at UTEP	L 69–76	6–3	Don Haskins Center (6,341); El Paso, TX
Dec 16, 2017*; 3:00 pm, P12N		IUPUI	W 72–59	7–3	Beasley Coliseum (2,240); Pullman, WA
Dec 20, 2017*; 8:00 pm, ESPN2		vs. Kansas State; Spokane Showcase	L 65–68	7–4	Spokane Arena (4,165); Spokane, WA
Dec 22, 2017*; 6:00 pm, P12N		Bethune–Cookman	W 86–58	8–4	Beasley Coliseum (2,178); Pullman, WA
Pac-12 regular season
Dec 29, 2017; 8:00 pm, ESPN2		at UCLA	L 82–96	8–5 (0–1)	Pauley Pavilion (8,089); Los Angeles, CA
Dec 31, 2017; 6:00 pm, ESPN2		at USC	L 71–89	8–6 (0–2)	Galen Center (2,518); Los Angeles, CA
Jan 6, 2018; 1:00 pm, P12N		Washington; Rivalry	L 65–70	8–7 (0–3)	Beasley Coliseum (3,477); Pullman, WA
Jan 11, 2018; 6:00 pm, ESPNU		Stanford	L 70–79	8–8 (0–4)	Beasley Coliseum (2,540); Pullman, WA
Jan 13, 2018; 1:00 pm, P12N		California	W 78–53	9–8 (1–4)	Beasley Coliseum (3,178); Pullman, WA
Jan 18, 2018; 5:00 pm, P12N		at Colorado	L 73–82	9–9 (1–5)	Coors Events Center (7,477); Boulder, CO
Jan 21, 2018; 5:00 pm, ESPNU		at Utah	L 69–82	9–10 (1–6)	Jon M. Huntsman Center (11,241); Salt Lake City, UT
Jan 28, 2018; 5:00 pm, ESPNU		at Washington; Rivalry	L 62–80	9–11 (1–7)	Alaska Airlines Arena (10,000); Seattle, WA
Jan 31, 2018; 7:00 pm, P12N		No. 9 Arizona	L 72–100	9–12 (1–8)	Beasley Coliseum (4,607); Pullman, WA
Feb 4, 2018; 1:00 pm, ESPNU		No. 25 Arizona State	L 78–88	9–13 (1–9)	Beasley Coliseum (2,803); Pullman, WA
Feb 8, 2018; 7:30 pm, P12N		at Oregon State	L 62–94	9–14 (1–10)	Gill Coliseum (4,235); Corvallis, OR
Feb 11, 2018; 5:00 pm, ESPNU		at Oregon	L 57–84	9–15 (1–11)	Matthew Knight Arena (9,419); Eugene, OR
Feb 15, 2018; 8:00 pm, P12N		Colorado	W 73–69	10–15 (2–11)	Beasley Coliseum (2,249); Pullman, WA
Feb 17, 2018; 8:00 pm, ESPN2		Utah	L 70–77	10–16 (2–12)	Beasley Coliseum (2,924); Pullman, WA
Feb 22, 2018; 8:00 pm, P12N		at California	W 78–76	11–16 (3–12)	Haas Pavilion (6,552); Berkeley, CA
Feb 24, 2018; 4:00 pm, P12N		at Stanford	L 84–86	11–17 (3–13)	Maples Pavilion (7,391); Stanford, CA
Mar 1, 2018; 6:00 pm, ESPN2		Oregon	W 78–76	12–17 (4–13)	Beasley Coliseum (2,592); Pullman, WA
Mar 3, 2018; 3:30 pm, P12N		Oregon State	L 67–92	12–18 (4–14)	Beasley Coliseum (3,148); Pullman, WA
Pac-12 Tournament
Mar 7, 2018; 8:30 pm, P12N	(11)	vs. (6) Oregon; First round	L 62–64 ^{OT}	12–19	T-Mobile Arena (10,458); Paradise, NV
*Non-conference game. ^{#}Rankings from AP Poll. (#) Tournament seedings in parentheses. All times are in Pacific Time.
