= 2018 Pac-12 Conference men's basketball tournament =

- Classification: Division I
- Season: 2017–18
- Teams: 12
- Site: T-Mobile Arena; Paradise, Nevada
- Champions: Arizona (7th title)
- Winning coach: Sean Miller (3rd title)
- MVP: Deandre Ayton (Arizona)
- Attendance: 80,550
- Top scorer: Deandre Ayton (Arizona) (74 points)
- Television: Pac-12 Network; FS1

2017–18 Pac-12 Conference men's basketball standings
	Conf.				Overall
Team	W		L	PCT	W		L	PCT
No. 12 Arizona †	14	–	4	.778	27	–	8	.771
USC	12	–	6	.667	24	–	12	.667
UCLA	11	–	7	.611	21	–	12	.636
Utah	11	–	7	.611	23	–	12	.657
Stanford	11	–	7	.611	19	–	16	.543
Oregon	10	–	8	.556	23	–	13	.639
Washington	10	–	8	.556	21	–	13	.618
Colorado	8	–	10	.444	17	–	15	.531
Arizona State	8	–	10	.444	20	–	12	.625
Oregon State	7	–	11	.389	16	–	16	.500
Washington State	4	–	14	.222	12	–	19	.387
California	2	–	16	.111	8	–	24	.250
† Pac-12 Tournament winner Rankings from AP poll

The 2018 Pac-12 Conference men's basketball tournament was the postseason men's basketball tournament for the Pac-12 Conference and was played during March 7–10, 2018, at T-Mobile Arena on the Las Vegas Strip in Paradise, Nevada. Number 1 seed Arizona defeated Number 2 seed USC in the championship game. Deandre Ayton was the Tournament MVP.

== Seeds ==
The bracket was announced on March 3, 2018. All 12 Pac-12 schools were eligible to participate in the tournament. Teams were seeded by conference record, with a tiebreaker system used to seed teams with identical conference records. As a result, the top four teams receive a bye to the quarterfinals of the tournament. Tiebreaking procedures were remain unchanged from the 2017 Tournament.

- Record between the tied teams
- Record against the highest-seeded team not involved in the tie, going down through the seedings as necessary
- Higher RPI:
- Head-to-head

Seed	School	Conference	Overall	Tiebreaker
1	Arizona†#	14–4	24–7	
2	USC#	12–6	21–10	
3	Utah#	11–7	19–10	1–0 vs. Stanford, 1–1 vs. UCLA
4	UCLA#	11–7	20–10	1–1 vs. Stanford, 1–1 vs. Utah
5	Stanford	11–7	17–14	0–1 vs. Utah, 1–1 vs. UCLA
6	Oregon	10–8	20–11	2–0 vs. Washington
7	Washington	10–8	20–10	0–2 vs. Oregon
8	Colorado	8–10	16–14	1–1 vs. ASU, 1–1 vs. Arizona
9	Arizona State	8–10	20–10	1–1 vs. Colorado, 0–2 vs. Arizona
10	Oregon State	7–11	15–15	
11	Washington State	4–14	12–18	
12	California	2–16	8–23	
† – Pac-12 Conference regular season champions # – Received a first round bye in the conference tournament.

== Schedule ==
The tournament schedule was announced at the same time as the seeding on March 3, 2018.

Game	Time	Matchup	Score	Television	Attendance
First round – Wednesday, March 7
1	12:00 pm	No. 8 Colorado vs. No. 9 Arizona State	97−85	Pac-12 Network	8,619
2	2:30 pm	No. 5 Stanford vs. No. 12 California	76–58	Pac-12 Network	8,619
3	6:00 pm	No. 7 Washington vs. No. 10 Oregon State	66–69^{OT}	Pac-12 Network	10,458
4	8:30 pm	No. 6 Oregon vs. No. 11 Washington State	64–62^{OT}	Pac-12 Network	10,458
Quarterfinals – Thursday, March 8
5	12:00 pm	No. 1 Arizona vs. No. 8 Colorado	83–67	Pac-12 Network	15,182
6	2:30 pm	No. 4 UCLA vs. No. 5 Stanford	88–77	Pac-12 Network	15,182
7	6:00 pm	No. 2 USC vs. No. 10 Oregon State	61–48	Pac-12 Network	13,194
8	8:30 pm	No. 3 Utah vs. No. 6 Oregon	66–68	FS1	13,194
Semifinals – Friday, March 9
9	6:00 pm	No. 1 Arizona vs No. 4 UCLA	78–67^{OT}	Pac–12 Network	16,596
10	8:30 pm	No. 2 USC vs No. 6 Oregon	74–54	FS1	16,596
Championship – Saturday, March 10
11	7:00 pm	No. 1 Arizona vs No. 2 USC	75–61	FS1	16,501
Game times in PT. Rankings denote tournament seed.

== Bracket ==
Teams were reseed after each round with highest remaining seeds receiving home court advantage.

First round Wednesday, March 7
8	Colorado	97
9	Arizona State	85
5	Stanford	76
12	California	58
7	Washington	66
10	Oregon State	69*
6	Oregon	64*
11	Washington State	62

Quarterfinals; Thursday, March 8
1	Arizona	83
8	Colorado	67
4	UCLA	88
5	Stanford	77
2	USC	61
10	Oregon State	48
3	Utah	66
6	Oregon	68

Semifinals; Friday, March 9
1	Arizona	78*
4	UCLA	67
2	USC	74
6	Oregon	54

Championship; Saturday, March 10
1	Arizona	75
2	USC	61

* denotes overtime period

== Game statistics ==
=== First round ===
Pac-12 Network

March 7
12:00 pm PST

No. 8 Colorado 97, No. 9 Arizona State 85
Scoring by half: 41−37, 56−48
Pts: McKinley Wright IV, 20; Rebs: Tyler Bey, 10; Asts: McKinley Wright IV, 10	Pts: Remy Martin, 20; Rebs: De'Quon Lake, 8 Asts: Kodi Justice, 6

T-Mobile Arena
Paradise, NV
Attendance: 8,619
Referees: Mike Reed, Eric Curry, Kevin Bril

Pac-12 Network

March 7
2:30 pm PST

No. 5 Stanford 76, No. 12 California 58
Scoring by half: 39−28, 37−30
Pts: Reid Travis, 19; Rebs: Reid Travis, 13; Asts: Three tied, 3	Pts: Darius McNeill, 19; Rebs: Don Coleman, 8 Asts: Justice Sueing, 2

T-Mobile Arena
Paradise, NV
Attendance: 8,619
Referees: Greg Nixon, Mike Scyphers, Nate Harris

Pac-12 Network

March 7
6:00 pm PST

No. 7 Washington 66, No. 10 Oregon State 69 (OT)
Scoring by half: 29–25, 28–32 Overtime: 9–12
Pts: Matisse Thybulle, 16; Rebs: Noah Dickerson, 10; Asts: 3 tied, 3	Pts: Drew Eubanks, 19; Rebs: Tres Tinkle, 10; Asts: Ethan Thompson, 4

T-Mobile Arena
Paradise, NV
Attendance: 10,458
Referees: Mike Greenstein, Deldre Carr, Larry Spaulding

Pac-12 Network

March 7
8:30 pm PST

No. 6 Oregon 64, No. 11 Washington State 62 (OT)
Scoring by half: 17–24, 36–29 Overtime: 11–9
Pts: 2 tied, 18; Rebs: Troy Brown, 11; Asts: Paul White, 5	Pts: Malachi Flynn, 22; Rebs: Drick Bernstine, 9 Asts: Drick Bernstine, 5

T-Mobile Arena
Paradise, NV
Attendance: 10,458
Referees: Tony Padilla, Michael Irving, Tommy Nunez

=== Quarterfinals ===
Pac-12 Network

March 8
12:00 pm PST

No. 1 Arizona 83, No. 8 Colorado 67
Scoring by half: 35–33, 48–34
Pts: Allonzo Trier, 22; Rebs: Dušan Ristić, 11; Asts: Parker Jackson-Cartwright, 4	Pts: George King, 19; Rebs: Tyler Bey, 10; Asts: McKinley Wright IV, 5

T-Mobile Arena
Paradise, NV
Attendance: 15,182
Referees: Verne Harris, Mike Scyphers, Nate Harris

Pac-12 Network

March 8
2:30 pm PST

No. 4 UCLA 88, No. 5 Stanford 77
Scoring by half: 44–40
Pts: Aaron Holiday, 34; Rebs: Thomas Welsh, 11; Asts: Aaron Holiday, 9	Pts: Kezie Okpala, 23; Rebs: Reid Travis, 14; Asts: Kezie Okpala, 5

T-Mobile Arena
Paradise, NV
Attendance: 15,182
Referees: Kevin Brill, David Hall, Glen Mayberry

Pac-12 Network

March 8
6:05 pm PST

No. 2 USC 61, No. 10 Oregon State 48
Scoring by half: 29–18, 32–29
Pts: Chimezie Metu, 22; Rebs: Chimezie Metu, 11; Asts: Jordan McLaughlin, 4	Pts: Stephen Thompson Jr., 12; Rebs: Drew Eubanks, 9 Asts: Ethan Thompson, 5

T-Mobile Arena
Paradise, NV
Referees: Randy McCall, Michael Irving, Deron White

FS1

March 8
8:30 pm PST

No. 3 Utah 66, No. 6 Oregon 68
Scoring by half: 30–25, 36–43
Pts: Justin Bibbins, 20; Rebs: Tyler Rawson, 8 Asts: 2 tied, 2	Pts: Elijah Brown, 21; Rebs: Kenny Wooten, 8 Asts: MiKyle McIntosh, 3

T-Mobile Arena
Paradise, NV
Attendance: 13,194
Referees: Chris Rastatter, Dick Cartmell, Frank Harve

=== Semifinals ===
Pac-12 Network

March 9
6:00 pm PST

No. 1 Arizona 78, No. 4 UCLA 67 (OT)
Scoring by half: 30–26, 37–41 Overtime: 11–0
Pts: Deandre Ayton, 32; Rebs: Deandre Ayton, 14; Asts: Parker Jackson-Cartwright, 4	Pts: Thomas Welsh, 17; Rebs: Thomas Welsh, 17; Asts: 3 tied, 3

T-Mobile Arena
Paradise, NV
Attendance: 16,596
Referees: Tony Padilla, David Hall, Mike Reed

FS1

March 9
8:30 pm PST

No. 2 USC 74, No. 6 Oregon 54
Scoring by half: 37–23, 37–31
Pts: Jonah Mathews, 27; Rebs: Nick Rakocevic, 11; Asts: Jordan McLaughlin, 9	Pts: MiKyle McIntosh, 21; Rebs: 2 tied, 5 Asts: Payton Pritchard, 7

T-Mobile Arena
Paradise, NV
Attendance: 16,596
Referees: Verne Harris, Greg Nixon, Tommy Nunez Jr.

=== Championship ===
FS1

March 10
7:00 pm PST

No. 1 Arizona 75, No. 2 USC 61
Scoring by half: 30–33, 45–28
Pts: Deandre Ayton, 32; Rebs: Deandre Ayton, 18; Asts: Parker Jackson-Cartwright, 5	Pts: Nick Rakocevic, 13; Rebs: Nick Rakocevic, 6 Asts: Jordan McLaughlin, 9

T-Mobile Arena
Paradise, NV
Attendance: 16,501
Referees: Randy McCall, Tony Padilla, Mike Reed

== Awards and honors ==
=== Hall of Honor ===
The following former players were inducted into the Pac-12 Hall of Honor on Friday, March 7, during a ceremony prior to the semifinals of the 2018 Pac-12 men's basketball tournament: Michael Wright (Arizona men's basketball), Linda Vollstedt (Arizona State women's golf), Matt Biondi (California men's swimming), Bill Toomey (Colorado men's track and field), Andrew Wheating (Oregon men's track and field), Carol Menken-Schaudt (Oregon State women's basketball), Kerri Walsh Jennings (Stanford women's volleyball), Rafer Johnson (UCLA track and field and men's basketball). Cheryl Miller (USC women's basketball), Missy Marlowe (Utah gymnastics), Sonny Sixkiller (Washington football), and Laura Lavine (Washington State women's track and field).

=== Team and tournament leaders ===
Team	Points		Rebounds		Assists		Steals		Blocks		Minutes	
Arizona	Deandre Ayton	74	Deandre Ayton	38	Parker Jackson-Cartwright	13	Parker Jackson-Cartwright	6	Deandre Ayton	6	Allonzo Trier	113
Arizona State	Remy Martin	20	De'Quon Lake	8	Kodi Justice	6	3 tied	1	Mickey Mitchell	2	2 tied	36
California	Darius McNeill	19	Don Coleman	8	Justice Sueing	2	Darius McNeill	3	Kingsley Okoroh	5	Darius McNeill	36
Colorado	George King	31	Tyler Bey	20	McKinley Wright IV	16	George King	2	2 tied	2	George King	62
Oregon	MiKyle McIntosh	57	Kenny Wooten	15	Paul White	11	Troy Brown	7	Kenny Wooten	4	Payton Pritchard	84
Oregon State	Drew Eubanks	30	Tres Tinkle	16	Ethan Thompson	9	Tres Tinkle	4	2 tied	1	Tres Tinkle	79
Stanford	Reid Travis	36	Reid Travis	27	Kezie Okpala	8	Kezie Okpala	6	Michael Humphrey	2	Dorian Pickens	69
UCLA	Aaron Holiday	59	Thomas Welsh	28	Aaron Holiday	11	Aaron Holiday	2	Gyorgy Goloman	1	Aaron Holiday	85
USC	Chimezie Metu	39	Chimezie Metu	24	Jordan McLaughlin	21	Jordan McLaughlin	10	Chimezie Metu	5	Jordan McLaughlin	113
Utah	Justin Bibbins	20	Tyler Rawson	8	2 tied	4	Justin Bibbins	2	3 tied	1	Justin Bibbins	40
Washington	Matisse Thybulle	16	Noah Dickerson	10	3 tied	3	Noah Dickerson	2	2 tied	2	Matisse Thybulle	44
Washington State	Malachi Flynn	22	Drick Bernstine	9	Drick Bernstine	5	Drick Bernstine	3	2 tied	1	Drick Bernstine	43

=== All-Tournament Team ===
Name	Pos.	Height	Weight	Year	Team
Deandre Ayton	F	7'1"	250	Fr.	Arizona
Dušan Ristić	C	7'0"	245	Sr.	Arizona
Aaron Holiday	G	6'1"	185	Jr.	UCLA
Thomas Welsh	C	7'0"	255	Sr.	UCLA
Jonah Matthews	G	6'3"	195	So.	USC
Jordan McLaughlin	G	6'1"	185	Sr.	USC

=== Most Outstanding Player ===
Name	Pos.	Height	Weight	Year	Team
Deandre Ayton	F	7'1"	250	Fr.	Arizona

== Tournament notes ==
Eight teams were invited to postseason play from the Pac-12 conference Three Pac-12 teams earned bids to the 2018 NCAA Division I men's basketball tournament:

- Arizona: the conference and tournament champion, No. 4 seed in South Regional,
- Arizona State: No. 11 seed in Midwest Regional
- UCLA: No. 11 seed in East Regional

Both Arizona State and UCLA were placed in the First Four, games between the four lowest-ranked at-large teams at Dayton, Ohio. Both teams lost their first game on the first Tuesday of the Tournament. Arizona lost its first-round game as well, leaving the Pac-12 with no teams in the round of 32.

Five Pac-12 teams were placed with at-large bids in the 2018 National Invitation Tournament, the most-ever for the Conference: USC, Utah, Oregon, Stanford, and Washington.

== See also ==
- 2018 Pac-12 Conference women's basketball tournament
