= 2017–18 Washington Huskies men's basketball team =

American college basketball season

2017–18 Washington Huskies men's basketball

NIT, Second Round
- Conference: Pac-12 Conference
- Record: 21–13 (10–8 Pac-12)
- Head coach: Mike Hopkins (1st season)
- Assistant coaches: Will Conroy (3rd season); Cameron Dollar (1st season); Dave Rice (1st season)
- Captains: Matisse Thybulle; David Crisp
- Home arena: Alaska Airlines Arena

2017–18 Pac-12 Conference men's basketball standings
	Conf.				Overall
Team	W		L	PCT	W		L	PCT
No. 12 Arizona †	14	–	4	.778	27	–	8	.771
USC	12	–	6	.667	24	–	12	.667
UCLA	11	–	7	.611	21	–	12	.636
Utah	11	–	7	.611	23	–	12	.657
Stanford	11	–	7	.611	19	–	16	.543
Oregon	10	–	8	.556	23	–	13	.639
Washington	10	–	8	.556	21	–	13	.618
Colorado	8	–	10	.444	17	–	15	.531
Arizona State	8	–	10	.444	20	–	12	.625
Oregon State	7	–	11	.389	16	–	16	.500
Washington State	4	–	14	.222	12	–	19	.387
California	2	–	16	.111	8	–	24	.250
† Pac-12 Tournament winner Rankings from AP poll

The 2017–18 Washington Huskies men's basketball team represented the University of Washington in the 2017–18 NCAA Division I men's basketball season. Led by first-year head coach Mike Hopkins, the Huskies played their home games at Alaska Airlines Arena at Hec Edmundson Pavilion in Seattle, Washington as members of the Pac-12 Conference. They finished the season 21–13, 10–8 in Pac-12 play, in a tie for sixth.

Washington lost to tenth-seeded Oregon State in overtime in the first round of the Pac-12 tournament, then received an invitation to the National Invitation Tournament. They defeated Boise State in the first round in Seattle, but lost on the road to Saint Mary's in the second round.

== Previous season ==
The 2016–17 Huskies finished the season at 9–22, 2–16 in Pac-12 play, in eleventh place. Washington lost to sixth-seed USC in the first round of the Pac-12 tournament. On March 15, it was announced that head coach Lorenzo Romar would not be retained for a sixteenth year. Four days later, he was succeeded by Hopkins, a longtime assistant at Syracuse under Jim Boeheim.

== Off-season ==
=== Departures ===
Name	Number	Pos.	Height	Weight	Year	Hometown	Reason for departure
Quin Barnard	5	G	6'0"	175	Freshman	Bellevue, WA	Walk-on; left the team for personal reasons
Malik Dime	10	F	6'9"	220	Senior	Dakar, Senegal	Graduated
Markelle Fultz	20	G	6'4"	195	Freshman	Upper Marlboro, MD	Declared for 2017 NBA draft
Matthew Atewe	41	F	6'9"	250	RS junior	Toronto, ON	Graduate transferred to Pepperdine

=== 2017 recruiting class ===
College recruiting
Name	Hometown	School	Height	Weight	Commit date
Jaylen Nowell; SG	Seattle, WA	Garfield HS	6 ft 4 in (1.93 m)	185 lb (84 kg)	Jun 29, 2016
Jaylen Nowell; SG	Recruit ratings: Scout: Rivals: 247Sports: ESPN: (85)				
Michael Carter III; SG	Seattle, WA	Elite Sports Academy	6 ft 4 in (1.93 m)	180 lb (82 kg)	Apr 12, 2017
Michael Carter III; SG	Recruit ratings: Scout: Rivals: 247Sports: ESPN: (POST)				
Nate Pryor; PG	Seattle, WA	West Seattle HS	6 ft 1 in (1.85 m)	165 lb (75 kg)	Apr 12, 2017
Nate Pryor; PG	Recruit ratings: Scout: Rivals: 247Sports: ESPN: (NR)				
Nahziah Carter; SF	Rochester, NY	Bishop Kearney HS	6 ft 6 in (1.98 m)	185 lb (84 kg)	Jun 9, 2017
Nahziah Carter; SF	Recruit ratings: Scout: Rivals: 247Sports: ESPN: (75)				
Hameir Wright; SF	Albany, NY	The Albany Academy	6 ft 7 in (2.01 m)	195 lb (88 kg)	Jun 24, 2017
Hameir Wright; SF	Recruit ratings: Scout: Rivals: 247Sports: ESPN: (82)				
Overall recruit ranking:
Note: In many cases, Scout, Rivals, 247Sports, On3, and ESPN may conflict in their listings of height and weight.; In these cases, the average was taken. ESPN grades are on a 100-point scale.; Sources: "2017 Washington Signees". Rivals.; "2017 Washington Signees". Scout.; "2017 Washington Signees". ESPN.; "Scout.com Team Recruiting Rankings". Scout.; "2017 Team Ranking". Rivals.

== Future recruits ==
College recruiting (2018)
Name	Hometown	School	Height	Weight	Commit date
Elijah Hardy; PG	Oakland, CA	Bishop O'Dowd High School	6 ft 2 in (1.88 m)	160 lb (73 kg)	Sep 9, 2017
Elijah Hardy; PG	Recruit ratings: Scout: Rivals: 247Sports: ESPN:				
Jamal Bey; SF	Las Vegas, NV	Bishop Gorman High School	6 ft 6 in (1.98 m)	185 lb (84 kg)	Sep 30, 2017
Jamal Bey; SF	Recruit ratings: Scout: Rivals: 247Sports: ESPN:				
Nate Roberts; PF	Edgewood, MD	Brewster Academy	6 ft 11.5 in (2.12 m)	220 lb (100 kg)	Oct 17, 2017
Nate Roberts; PF	Recruit ratings: Scout: Rivals: 247Sports: ESPN:				
Bryan Penn-Johnson; C	Las Vegas, NV	Wasatch Academy	7 ft 0 in (2.13 m)	215 lb (98 kg)	Mar 19, 2018
Bryan Penn-Johnson; C	Recruit ratings: Scout: Rivals: 247Sports: ESPN:				
Overall recruit ranking:
Note: In many cases, Scout, Rivals, 247Sports, On3, and ESPN may conflict in their listings of height and weight.; In these cases, the average was taken. ESPN grades are on a 100-point scale.; Sources: "2018 Washington Commits". Rivals.; "2018 Team Ranking". Rivals.

== Roster ==
2017–18 Washington Huskies men's basketball team
Players
Coaches

Pos.	#	Name	Height	Weight	Year	Previous school	Hometown
G	0	Bitumba Baruti	6 ft 6 in (1.98 m)	210 lb (95 kg)	So	Mountain Mission School	DR Congo
G	1	David Crisp (C)	6 ft 0 in (1.83 m)	195 lb (88 kg)	Jr	Brewster Academy	Tacoma, WA
G	2	Dan Kingma	5 ft 10 in (1.78 m)	160 lb (73 kg)	Sr	Henry M. Jackson HS	Mill Creek, WA
G	4	Matisse Thybulle (C)	6 ft 5 in (1.96 m)	195 lb (88 kg)	Jr	Eastside Catholic School	Issaquah, WA
G	5	Jaylen Nowell	6 ft 4 in (1.93 m)	200 lb (91 kg)	Fr	Garfield HS	Seattle, WA
F	11	Nahziah Carter	6 ft 6 in (1.98 m)	205 lb (93 kg)	Fr	Bishop Kearney HS	Rochester, NY
G	12	Jason Crandall (W)	6 ft 0 in (1.83 m)	155 lb (70 kg)	So	Issaquah HS	Issaquah, WA
F	13	Hamier Wright	6 ft 9 in (2.06 m)	215 lb (98 kg)	Fr	The Albany Academy	Albany, NY
G	14	Michael Carter III	6 ft 4 in (1.93 m)	190 lb (86 kg)	Fr	Elite Sports Academy	Seattle, WA
F	15	Noah Dickerson	6 ft 8 in (2.03 m)	245 lb (111 kg)	Jr	Montverde Academy	Atlanta, GA
F	22	Dominic Green	6 ft 6 in (1.98 m)	190 lb (86 kg)	Jr	Hazen HS	Renton, WA
G	23	Carlos Johnson	6 ft 3 in (1.91 m)	215 lb (98 kg)	So	Findlay Prep	Centralia, IL
F	24	Devenir Duruisseau	6 ft 8 in (2.03 m)	245 lb (111 kg)	Jr	Fishburne Military School	Palmdale, CA
F	32	Greg Bowman (W)	6 ft 7 in (2.01 m)	225 lb (102 kg)	Sr	Mountlake Terrace HS	Mountlake Terrace, WA
F	33	Sam Timmins	6 ft 11 in (2.11 m)	265 lb (120 kg)	So	Otago Boys' High School	Dunedin, NZ

Head coach

- Mike Hopkins (Syracuse)

Assistant coach(es)

- Will Conroy (Washington)
- Cameron Dollar (UCLA)
- Dave Rice (UNLV)

Legend

- (C) Team captain
- (S) Suspended
- (I) Ineligible
- (W) Walk-on
- Injured
- Current redshirt

Roster
Last update: October 7, 2017

=== Notes ===
Devenir Duruisseau departed the team on November 22, 2017, having only played in the Belmont game.

== Schedule and results ==
Date time, TV	Rank^{#}	Opponent^{#}	Result	Record	High points	High rebounds	High assists	Site (attendance) city, state
Exhibition
Nov 2, 2017*; 7:00 pm		Saint Martin's	W 91–87	–	21 – Dickerson	10 – Dickerson	4 – Crisp	Alaska Airlines Arena (N/A); Seattle, WA
Non-conference regular season
Nov 10, 2017*; 7:00 pm, P12N		Belmont; 2K Classic campus-site game	W 86–82	1–0	32 – Nowell	5 – Nowell	2 – 3 tied	Alaska Airlines Arena (5,883); Seattle, WA
Nov 12, 2017*; 5:00 pm, P12N		Eastern Washington	W 79–69	2–0	28 – Dickerson	22 – Dickerson	3 – Thybulle	Alaska Airlines Arena (5,609); Seattle, WA
Nov 16, 2017*; 6:30 pm, ESPN2		vs. Providence; 2K Classic semifinals	L 70–77	2–1	19 – Dickerson	8 – Timmins	4 – Crisp	Madison Square Garden (6,104); New York, NY
Nov 17, 2017*; 2:00 pm, ESPN2		vs. Virginia Tech; 2K Classic 3rd place game	L 79–103	2–2	21 – Nowell	5 – Johnson	7 – Thybulle	Madison Square Garden (N/A); New York, NY
Nov 24, 2017*; 12:00 pm, P12N		Seattle; 2K Classic campus-site game	W 89–84	3–2	25 – Nowell	8 – Timmins	4 – 2 tied	Alaska Airlines Arena (6,428); Seattle, WA
Nov 26, 2017*; 5:00 pm, P12N		UC Davis	W 77–70	4–2	21 – Nowell	11 – Dickerson	6 – Crisp	Alaska Airlines Arena (5,328); Seattle, WA
Nov 28, 2017*; 6:00 pm, P12N		Kennesaw State	W 85–71	5–2	24 – Dickerson	8 – 2 tied	4 – 2 tied	Alaska Airlines Arena (4,858); Seattle, WA
Dec 3, 2017*; 4:00 pm, P12N		Omaha	W 86–73	6–2	24 – Crisp	6 – 4 tied	4 – Nowell	Alaska Airlines Arena (4,903); Seattle, WA
Dec 6, 2017*; 6:00 pm, ESPN2		at No. 2 Kansas; Jayhawk Shootout	W 74–65	7–2	19 – Thybulle	14 – Dickerson	7 – Crisp	Sprint Center (17,106); Kansas City, MO
Dec 10, 2017*; 5:00 pm, P12N		No. 12 Gonzaga; Rivalry	L 70–97	7–3	18 – Dickerson	5 – Nowell	4 – Nowell	Alaska Airlines Arena (9,749); Seattle, WA
Dec 17, 2017*; 3:00 pm, P12N		Loyola Marymount	W 80–78	8–3	21 – Nowell	11 – Timmins	6 – Crisp	Alaska Airlines Arena (4,856); Seattle, WA
Dec 19, 2017*; 7:00 pm, P12N		Bethune–Cookman	W 106–55	9–3	18 – 2 tied	7 – Timmins	5 – Nowell	Alaska Airlines Arena (4,452); Seattle, WA
Dec 22, 2017*; 8:00 pm, P12N		Montana	W 66–63	10–3	13 – Nowell	7 – Dickerson	2 – Tied	Alaska Airlines Arena (5,915); Seattle, WA
Pac-12 regular season
Dec 29, 2017; 7:30 pm, P12N		at USC	W 88–81	11–3 (1–0)	17 – Dickerson	7 – Dickerson	6 – Nowell	Galen Center (3,104); Los Angeles, CA
Dec 31, 2017; 5:00 pm, P12N		at UCLA	L 53–74	11–4 (1–1)	14 – Dickerson	9 – Timmons	3 – Tied	Pauley Pavilion (7,639); Los Angeles, CA
Jan 6, 2018; 1:00 pm, P12N		at Washington State; Rivalry	W 70–65	12–4 (2–1)	17 – Thybulle	6 – Dickerson	3 – Crisp	Beasley Coliseum (3,477); Pullman, WA
Jan 11, 2018; 8:00 pm, P12N		California	W 66–56	13–4 (3–1)	20 – Nowell	6 – Tied	4 – Wright	Alaska Airlines Arena (5,804); Seattle, WA
Jan 13, 2018; 5:00 pm, P12N		Stanford	L 64–73	13–5 (3–2)	20 – Nowell	7 – Dickerson	3 – Crisp	Alaska Airlines Arena (8,256); Seattle, WA
Jan 18, 2018; 7:00 pm, P12N		at Utah	L 62–70	13–6 (3–3)	17 – Nowell	8 – Nowell	2 – Tied	Jon M. Huntsman Center (12,378); Salt Lake City, UT
Jan 20, 2018; 3:00 pm, P12N		at Colorado	W 72–62	14–6 (4–3)	18 – Nowell	14 – Dickerson	3 – Crisp	Coors Events Center (8,787); Boulder, CO
Jan 28, 2018; 5:00 pm, ESPNU		Washington State; Rivalry	W 80–62	15–6 (5–3)	18 – Thybulle	9 – Nowell	6 – Thybulle	Alaska Airlines Arena (10,000); Seattle, WA
Feb 1, 2018; 8:00 pm, P12N		No. 25 Arizona State	W 68–64	16–6 (6–3)	21 – Dickerson	16 – Dickerson	3 – Nowell	Alaska Airlines Arena (6,904); Seattle, WA
Feb 3, 2018; 7:30 pm, P12N		No. 9 Arizona	W 78–75	17–6 (7–3)	25 – Dickerson	7 – 2 tied	2 – 3 tied	Alaska Airlines Arena (10,000); Seattle, WA
Feb 8, 2018; 8:00 pm, FS1		at Oregon	L 40–65	17–7 (7–4)	14 – Dickerson	11 – Dickerson	2 – 2 tied	Matthew Knight Arena (9,938); Eugene, OR
Feb 10, 2018; 7:00 pm, ESPNU		at Oregon State	L 94–97 ^{2OT}	17–8 (7–5)	28 – Dickerson	12 – Dickerson	7 – Crisp	Gill Coliseum (5,630); Corvallis, OR
Feb 15, 2018; 6:00 pm, P12N		Utah	L 58–70	17–9 (7–6)	18 – Crisp	6 – Dickerson	4 – Thybulle	Alaska Airlines Arena (8,170); Seattle, WA
Feb 17, 2018; 5:00 pm, P12N		Colorado; Isaiah Thomas’ Jersey Retirement	W 82–59	18–9 (8–6)	26 – Thybulle	10 – Dickerson	7 – Crisp	Alaska Airlines Arena (9,258); Seattle, WA
Feb 22, 2018; 6:00 pm, P12N		at Stanford	L 78–94	18–10 (8–7)	18 – Nowell	13 – Dickerson	5 – Nowell	Maples Pavilion (3,625); Stanford, CA
Feb 24, 2018; 1:00 pm, P12N		at California	W 68–51	19–10 (9–7)	23 – Nowell	9 – Dickerson	3 – N. Carter	Haas Pavilion (7,851); Berkeley, CA
Mar 1, 2018; 8:00 pm, ESPN2		Oregon State	W 79–77	20–10 (10–7)	25 – Dickerson	5 – Dickerson	4 – Nowell	Alaska Airlines Arena (6,480); Seattle, WA
Mar 3, 2018; 1:30 pm, P12N		Oregon	L 64–72	20–11 (10–8)	19 – Crisp	8 – Dickerson	4 – Nowell	Alaska Airlines Arena (9,912); Seattle, WA
Pac-12 Tournament
Mar 7, 2018; 6:00 pm, P12N	(7)	vs. (10) Oregon State; First Round	L 66–69 ^{OT}	20–12	16 – Thybulle	10 – Dickerson	3 – 3 tied	T-Mobile Arena (10,458); Paradise, NV
National Invitation Tournament (NIT)
Mar 14, 2018*; 7:00 pm, ESPN3	(5)	(4) Boise State; First Round – Saint Mary's Bracket	W 77–74	21–12	25 – Nowell	7 – Green	5 – Crisp	Alaska Airlines Arena (3,119); Seattle, WA
Mar 19, 2018*; 8:00 pm, ESPNU	(5)	at (1) No. 25 Saint Mary's; Second Round – Saint Mary's Bracket	L 81–85	21–13	22 – Dickerson	9 – Dickerson	4 – Thybulle	McKeon Pavilion (2,274); Moraga, CA
*Non-conference game. ^{#}Rankings from AP poll. (#) Tournament seedings in parentheses. All times are in Pacific Time.

== Awards and honors ==
On March 5, 2018 Mike Hopkins was named Pac-12 Coach of the Year and Matisse Thybulle was named Pac-12 Defensive Player of the Year.
