= 2017–18 Arizona State Sun Devils men's basketball team =

American college basketball season

2017–18 Arizona State Sun Devils men's basketball

Las Vegas Invitational champions

NCAA tournament, First Four
- Conference: Pac-12 Conference
- Record: 20–12 (8–10 Pac–12)
- Head coach: Bobby Hurley (3rd season)
- Assistant coaches: Rashon Bruno; Levi Watkins; Anthony Coleman
- Home arena: Wells Fargo Arena

2017–18 Pac-12 Conference men's basketball standings
| | Conf. | | | | Overall |
| Team | W | | L | PCT | W | | L | PCT |
|---|---|---|---|---|---|---|---|---|
| No. 12 Arizona † | 14 | – | 4 | .778 | 27 | – | 8 | .771 |
| USC | 12 | – | 6 | .667 | 24 | – | 12 | .667 |
| UCLA | 11 | – | 7 | .611 | 21 | – | 12 | .636 |
| Utah | 11 | – | 7 | .611 | 23 | – | 12 | .657 |
| Stanford | 11 | – | 7 | .611 | 19 | – | 16 | .543 |
| Oregon | 10 | – | 8 | .556 | 23 | – | 13 | .639 |
| Washington | 10 | – | 8 | .556 | 21 | – | 13 | .618 |
| Colorado | 8 | – | 10 | .444 | 17 | – | 15 | .531 |
| Arizona State | 8 | – | 10 | .444 | 20 | – | 12 | .625 |
| Oregon State | 7 | – | 11 | .389 | 16 | – | 16 | .500 |
| Washington State | 4 | – | 14 | .222 | 12 | – | 19 | .387 |
| California | 2 | – | 16 | .111 | 8 | – | 24 | .250 |
† Pac-12 Tournament winner Rankings from AP poll

The 2017–18 Arizona State Sun Devils men's basketball team represented Arizona State University during the 2017–18 NCAA Division I men's basketball season. The Sun Devils were led by third-year head coach Bobby Hurley, and played their home games at Wells Fargo Arena in Tempe, Arizona as members of Pac–12 Conference. They finished the season 20–12, 8–10 in Pac-12 play to finish in a tie for eighth place. They lost in the first round of the Pac-12 tournament to Colorado. They received an at-large bid to the NCAA tournament where they lost in the First Four to Syracuse.

== Previous season ==
The Sun Devils finished the 2016–17 season 15–18, 7–11 in Pac-12 play to finish in 8th place. They received the #8 seed in the 2017 Pac-12 tournament. In the tournament, the Sun Devils' defeated #9 Stanford in the first round before losing to #1 seed Oregon in the quarterfinals.

== Off-season ==
=== Departures ===
| Name | Pos. | Height | Weight | Year | Hometown | Reason for departure |
|---|---|---|---|---|---|---|
| Torian Graham | SG | 6'5" | 195 | Senior | Durham, NC | Graduated |
| Maurice O'Field | G/F | 6'5" | 205 | Senior | Cleveland, OH | Graduated |
| Obinna Oleka | PF | 6'8" | 225 | Senior | Washington, D.C. | Graduated |
| Andre Adams | PF | 6'9" | 225 | RS Freshman | Avondale, AZ | Transferred to Southern Utah. |
| Jethro Tshisumpa | F/C | 6'10" | 260 | Freshman | DR Congo | Elected to transfer. |
| Sam Cunliffe | SF | 6'6" | 200 | Freshman | Seattle, WA | Left team 10 games into the season. Later elected to transfer to Kansas. |

=== Incoming transfers ===
| Name | Pos. | Height | Weight | Year | Hometown | Notes |
|---|---|---|---|---|---|---|
| Zylan Cheatham | PF | 6'9" | 220 | RS Jr. | Phoenix, AZ | Transfer from San Diego State. Will redshirt for the 2017–18 season per NCAA transfer rules and have one year remaining eligibility beginning the 2018–19 season. |
| Carlton Bragg Jr. | PF | 6'10" | 240 | Jr. | Cleveland, OH | Transfer from Kansas. Will redshirt for the 2017–18 season per NCAA transfer rules and have two years remaining eligibility beginning the 2018–19 season. |
| Rob Edwards | SG | 6'4" | 200 | Jr. | Detroit, MI | Transfer from Cleveland State. Will redshirt for the 2017–18 season per NCAA transfer rules and have two years of remaining eligibility beginning the 2018–19 season. |
| De'Quon Lake | F/C | 6'10" | - | Jr. | Newport News, VA | Junior college transfer from Iowa Western Community College. |
| Mickey Mitchell | SF | 6'7" | - | RS So. | Plano, TX | Mid-year transfer from Ohio State. Will be eligible to play in December of the 2017–18 season. |

=== 2017 recruiting class ===
College recruiting information
| Name | Hometown | School | Height | Weight | Commit date |
|---|---|---|---|---|---|
| Remy Martin; PG | Chatsworth, CA | Sierra Canyon School | 6 ft 0 in (1.83 m) | 170 lb (77 kg) | Jun 9, 2016 |
| Remy Martin; PG | Recruit ratings: Scout: Rivals: 247Sports: ESPN: (80) | | | | |
| Kimani Lawrence; SF | Providence, RI | New Hampton School | 6 ft 6 in (1.98 m) | 186 lb (84 kg) | Nov 10, 2016 |
| Kimani Lawrence; SF | Recruit ratings: Scout: Rivals: 247Sports: ESPN: (86) | | | | |
Overall recruit ranking:
Note: In many cases, Scout, Rivals, 247Sports, On3, and ESPN may conflict in their listings of height and weight.; In these cases, the average was taken. ESPN grades are on a 100-point scale.; Sources:

=== 2018 Recruiting class ===
College recruiting information (2018)
| Name | Hometown | School | Height | Weight | Commit date |
|---|---|---|---|---|---|
| Elias Valtonen; SG | Eura, Finland | Helsinki Basketball Academy | 6 ft 6 in (1.98 m) | 195 lb (88 kg) | Oct 13, 2017 |
| Elias Valtonen; SG | Recruit ratings: Scout: Rivals: 247Sports: ESPN: | | | | |
| Luguentz Dort; SG | Montreal, Quebec | Athlete Institute | 6 ft 4 in (1.93 m) | 200 lb (91 kg) | Oct 18, 2017 |
| Luguentz Dort; SG | Recruit ratings: Scout: Rivals: 247Sports: ESPN: | | | | |
| Taeshon Cherry; SF | San Diego, California | Foothills Christian High School | 6 ft 8 in (2.03 m) | 210 lb (95 kg) | Jan 16, 2018 |
| Taeshon Cherry; SF | Recruit ratings: Scout: Rivals: 247Sports: ESPN: | | | | |
| Uroš Plavšić; C | Ivanjica, Serbia | Hamilton Heights Christian Academy | 7 ft 1 in (2.16 m) | 240 lb (110 kg) | Apr 26, 2018 |
| Uroš Plavšić; C | Recruit ratings: Scout: Rivals: 247Sports: ESPN: | | | | |
Overall recruit ranking:
Note: In many cases, Scout, Rivals, 247Sports, On3, and ESPN may conflict in their listings of height and weight.; In these cases, the average was taken. ESPN grades are on a 100-point scale.; Sources: "2018 Team Ranking". Rivals.

== Roster ==
2017–18 Arizona State Sun Devils men's basketball team
Players
Coaches

| Pos. | # | Name | Height | Weight | Year | Previous school | Hometown |
|---|---|---|---|---|---|---|---|
| G | 0 | Tra Holder | 6 ft 1 in (1.85 m) | 180 lb (82 kg) | Sr | Brentwood School | Los Angeles, California |
| G | 1 | Remy Martin | 6 ft 0 in (1.83 m) | 170 lb (77 kg) | Fr | Sierra Canyon School | Chatsworth, California |
| G | 2 | Rob Edwards (redshirt) | 6 ft 4 in (1.93 m) | 200 lb (91 kg) | Jr | Cleveland State | Detroit, Michigan |
| F | 3 | Mickey Mitchell | 6 ft 7 in (2.01 m) | 225 lb (102 kg) | RS So | Ohio State | Plano, Texas |
| F | 10 | Vitaliy Shibel | 6 ft 9 in (2.06 m) | 210 lb (95 kg) | RS Fr | Lee Academy | Ukraine |
| G | 11 | Shannon Evans | 6 ft 1 in (1.85 m) | 172 lb (78 kg) | RS Sr | Buffalo | Suffolk, Virginia |
| F | 14 | Kimani Lawrence | 6 ft 7 in (2.01 m) | 210 lb (95 kg) | Fr | New Hampton School | Ashburnham, Massachusetts |
| G | 22 | Austin Witherill (W) | 6 ft 0 in (1.83 m) | 170 lb (77 kg) | Sr | Highland HS | Gilbert, Arizona |
| F | 23 | Romello White | 6 ft 8 in (2.03 m) | 235 lb (107 kg) | RS Fr | Joseph Wheeler HS | Suwanee, Georgia |
| G | 24 | Jordan Salzman (W) | 5 ft 10 in (1.78 m) | 175 lb (79 kg) | Fr | Locust Valley HS | Long Island, New York |
| G | 25 | Grant Fogerty (W) | 5 ft 11 in (1.8 m) | 165 lb (75 kg) | Fr | Desert Mountain HS | Scottsdale, Arizona |
| F | 31 | Zylan Cheatham (redshirt) | 6 ft 8 in (2.03 m) | 220 lb (100 kg) | RS Jr | San Diego State | Phoenix, Arizona |
| G | 34 | Trevor Thompson (W) | 6 ft 2 in (1.88 m) | 175 lb (79 kg) | Fr | Moon Valley HS | Phoenix, Arizona |
| F | 35 | De'Quon Lake | 6 ft 10 in (2.08 m) | 225 lb (102 kg) | Jr | Iowa Western C.C. | Newport News, Virginia |
| G | 41 | Imran Takhar (W) | 6 ft 4 in (1.93 m) | 200 lb (91 kg) | Fr | Villa Park HS | Orange, California |
| G | 44 | Kodi Justice | 6 ft 5 in (1.96 m) | 190 lb (86 kg) | Sr | Dobson HS | Mesa, Arizona |

Head coach

- Bobby Hurley (Duke)

Assistant coach(es)

- Rashon Bruno (DePaul)
- Levi Watkins (NC State)
- Anthony Coleman (Long Beach State)

Legend

- (C) Team captain
- (S) Suspended
- (I) Ineligible
- (W) Walk-on
- Injured
- Current redshirt

Roster
Last update: January 3, 2018

- Sophomore forward Ramon Vila decided to transfer.
- Transfer forward Carlton Bragg decided to transfer.

=== Depth chart ===
| Pos. | Starting 5 | Bench |
|---|---|---|
| C | Romello White | De'Quon Lake |
| PF | Mickey Mitchell | Vitaliy Shibel |
| SF | Kodi Justice | Kimani Lawrence |
| SG | Tra Holder |
| PG | Shannon Evans II | Remy Martin |

== Schedule and results ==
| Date time, TV | Rank^{#} | Opponent^{#} | Result | Record | Site (attendance) city, state |
Exhibition
| Oct 26, 2017*; 6:00 pm | | Northern State | W 98–90 ^{2OT} | – | Wells Fargo Arena; Tempe, AZ |
| Nov 1, 2017*; 7:00 pm | | at San Diego; Hurricane Maria relief charity game | W 85–77 | – | Jenny Craig Pavilion (757); San Diego, CA |
| Nov 3, 2017*; 6:00 pm | | Arizona Christian | W 115–69 | – | Wells Fargo Arena; Tempe, AZ |
Non-conference regular season
| Nov 10, 2017*; 8:00 pm, P12N | | Idaho State | W 94–74 | 1–0 | Wells Fargo Arena (5,697); Tempe, AZ |
| Nov 14, 2017*; 7:00 pm, P12N | | San Diego State | W 90–68 | 2–0 | Wells Fargo Arena (6,640); Tempe, AZ |
| Nov 17, 2017*; 6:00 pm, P12N | | Northern Arizona; Las Vegas Invitational campus-site game | W 97–62 | 3–0 | Wells Fargo Arena (6,189); Tempe, AZ |
| Nov 19, 2017*; 12:00 pm, P12N | | UC Irvine; Las Vegas Invitational campus-site game | W 99–78 | 4–0 | Wells Fargo Arena (5,394); Tempe, AZ |
| Nov 23, 2017*; 5:30 pm, FS1 | | vs. Kansas State; Las Vegas Invitational semifinals | W 92–90 | 5–0 | Orleans Arena; Paradise, NV |
| Nov 24, 2017*; 3:30 pm, FOX | | vs. No. 15 Xavier; Las Vegas Invitational championship | W 102–86 | 6–0 | Orleans Arena; Paradise, NV |
| Dec 2, 2017*; 7:00 pm, P12N | No. 20 | San Francisco | W 75–57 | 7–0 | Wells Fargo Arena (8,682); Tempe, AZ |
| Dec 8, 2017*; 6:00 pm, P12N | No. 16 | vs. St. John's; Basketball Hall of Fame Classic | W 82–70 | 8–0 | Staples Center; Los Angeles, CA |
| Dec 10, 2017*; 12:00 pm, ESPN | No. 16 | at No. 2 Kansas | W 95–85 | 9–0 | Allen Fieldhouse (16,300); Lawrence, KS |
| Dec 17, 2017*; 12:00 pm, P12N | No. 5 | Vanderbilt | W 76–64 | 10–0 | Wells Fargo Arena (10,797); Tempe, AZ |
| Dec 19, 2017*; 7:00 pm, P12N | No. 3 | Longwood | W 95–61 | 11–0 | Wells Fargo Arena (9,308); Tempe, AZ |
| Dec 22, 2017*; 1:00 pm, P12N | No. 3 | Pacific | W 104–65 | 12–0 | Wells Fargo Arena (10,646); Tempe, AZ |
Pac-12 regular season
| Dec 30, 2017; 7:00 pm, P12N | No. 3 | at No. 17 Arizona; Rivalry | L 78–84 | 12–1 (0–1) | McKale Center (14,644); Tucson, AZ |
| Jan 4, 2018; 6:30 pm, P12N | No. 4 | at Colorado | L 81–90 ^{OT} | 12–2 (0–2) | Coors Events Center (7,740); Boulder, CO |
| Jan 7, 2018; 6:00 pm, ESPNU | No. 4 | at Utah | W 80–77 | 13–2 (1–2) | Jon M. Huntsman Center (12,123); Salt Lake City, UT |
| Jan 11, 2018; 8:00 pm, FS1 | No. 11 | Oregon | L 72–76 | 13–3 (1–3) | Wells Fargo Arena (13,693); Tempe, AZ |
| Jan 13, 2018; 4:00 pm, P12N | No. 11 | Oregon State | W 77–75 | 14–3 (2–3) | Wells Fargo Arena (13,459); Tempe, AZ |
| Jan 17, 2018; 9:00 pm, P12N | No. 16 | at Stanford | L 77–86 | 14–4 (2–4) | Maples Pavilion (4,014); Stanford, CA |
| Jan 20, 2018; 8:30 pm, P12N | No. 16 | at California | W 81–73 | 15–4 (3–4) | Haas Pavilion (8,107); Berkeley, CA |
| Jan 25, 2018; 7:30 pm, P12N | No. 21 | Utah | L 77–80 ^{OT} | 15–5 (3–5) | Wells Fargo Arena (11,536); Tempe, AZ |
| Jan 27, 2018; 6:00 pm, ESPNU | No. 21 | Colorado | W 80–66 | 16–5 (4–5) | Wells Fargo Arena (13,943); Tempe, AZ |
| Feb 1, 2018; 9:00 pm, P12N | No. 25 | at Washington | L 64–68 | 16–6 (4–6) | Alaska Airlines Arena (6,904); Seattle, WA |
| Feb 4, 2018; 2:00 pm, ESPNU | No. 25 | at Washington State | W 88–78 | 17–6 (5–6) | Beasley Coliseum (2,803); Pullman, WA |
| Feb 8, 2018; 9:00 pm, ESPN2 | | USC | W 80–78 | 18–6 (6–6) | Wells Fargo Arena (12,377); Tempe, AZ |
| Feb 10, 2018; 5:00 pm, P12N | | UCLA | W 88–79 | 19–6 (7–6) | Wells Fargo Arena (14,025); Tempe, AZ |
| Feb 15, 2018; 7:00 pm, ESPN | No. 25 | No. 17 Arizona; Rivalry | L 70–77 | 19–7 (7–7) | Wells Fargo Arena (14,233); Tempe, AZ |
| Feb 22, 2018; 9:30 pm, FS1 | | at Oregon | L 68–75 | 19–8 (7–8) | Matthew Knight Arena (9,940); Eugene, OR |
| Feb 24, 2018; 6:00 pm, ESPNU | | at Oregon State | L 75–79 | 19–9 (7–9) | Gill Coliseum (6,147); Corvallis, OR |
| Mar 1, 2018; 7:00 pm, ESPNU | | California | W 84–53 | 20–9 (8–9) | Wells Fargo Arena (11,737); Tempe, AZ |
| Mar 3, 2018; 12:30 pm, P12N | | Stanford | L 83–84 | 20–10 (8–10) | Wells Fargo Arena (11,895); Tempe, AZ |
Pac-12 tournament
| Mar 7, 2018; 1:00 pm, P12N | (9) | vs. (8) Colorado; First Round | L 85–97 | 20–11 | T-Mobile Arena (8,619); Paradise, NV |
NCAA tournament
| Mar 14, 2018*; 6:10 pm, truTV | (11 MW) | vs. (11 MW) Syracuse; First Four | L 56–60 | 20–12 | UD Arena (12,732); Dayton, OH |
*Non-conference game. ^{#}Rankings from AP Poll. (#) Tournament seedings in parentheses. MW=Midwest. All times are in Mountain Time.

== Ranking movement ==
Ranking movements Legend: ██ Increase in ranking ██ Decrease in ranking — = Not ranked RV = Received votes т = Tied with team above or below ( ) = First-place votes
| | Week | | | | | | | | | | | | | | | | | | | |
| Poll | Pre | 1 | 2 | 3 | 4 | 5 | 6 | 7 | 8 | 9 | 10 | 11 | 12 | 13 | 14 | 15 | 16 | 17 | 18 | Final |
|---|---|---|---|---|---|---|---|---|---|---|---|---|---|---|---|---|---|---|---|---|
| AP | — | — | — | 20 | 16 | 5 (5) | 3 (5) | 3 (6) | 4 | 11 | 16 | 21 | 25 | RV | 25 | RV | — | | | Not released |
| Coaches | — | —^ | — | 21 | 17 | 6 | 4T | 4 | 6 | 11 | 14 | 19 | 23 | RV | 22 | 25 | RV | | | |

^Coaches Poll did not release a Week 2 poll at the same time AP did.
*AP does not release post-NCAA tournament rankings. Number in parentheses indicates number of first place votes.
