= Pac-12 Conference Men's Basketball Sixth Man of the Year =

Pac-12 Sixth Man Player of the Year
- Awarded for: the top bench player in men's basketball in the Pac-12
- Country: United States
- Presented by: Pac-12 Conference
- First award: 1983
- Currently held by: Koren Johnson, Washington

The Pac-12 Sixth Man Player of the Year is an annual college basketball award presented to the top bench player in men's basketball in the Pac-12 Conference. To be eligible for Pac-12 Sixth Man of the Year, players must not have exceeded more than one-third starts in league games. The winner was selected by conference coaches, who were not allowed to vote for players on their own team. The award began in 1984, when the conference consisted of 10 teams and was known as the Pacific-10. It stopped being issued starting after 1987 but was restarted in 2018. The conference added two teams and became the Pac-12 in 2011.

Mike Wurm was the conferences first Sixth Man of the Year with Washington State in 1984. The conference stopped giving the award after the 1986–87 season but reinstated the award before the 2017–18 season. The most recent winner of the award is Koren Johnson, Washington.

== Winners ==
†	Co-winners.

Season	Player	School	Class	Ref
1983–84	Mike Wurm	Washington State	Senior	
1984–85	Glenn Smith	USC	Senior	
1985–86	Al Moscatel	Washington	Junior	
1986–87	Montel Hatcher	UCLA	Senior	
2017–18	Dominique Collier	Colorado	Senior	
2017–18	Remy Martin	Arizona State	Freshman	
2018–19	Donnie Tillman	Utah	Sophomore	
2019–20	Alonzo Verge Jr.	Arizona State	Junior	
2020–21	Jordan Brown	Arizona	Sophomore	
2021–22	Pelle Larsson	Arizona	Sophomore	
2022–23	Reese Dixon-Waters	USC	Sophomore	
2023–24	Koren Johson	Washington	Sophomore	

== Winners by school ==
School (year joined)^{a}	Winners	Years
Arizona (1978)	2	2021, 2022
Arizona State (1978)	2	2018, 2020
USC (1922)	2	1985, 2023
Washington (1915)	2	1986, 2024
Colorado (2011)	1	2018
UCLA (1928)	1	1987
Utah (2011)	1	2019
Washington State (1917)	1	1984
California (1915)	0	—
Oregon (1915)	0	—
Oregon State (1915)	0	—
Stanford (1918)	0	—
