= 2017–18 Pac-12 Conference men's basketball season =

2017–18 Pac–12 men's basketball season
- League: NCAA Division I
- Sport: Basketball
- Teams: 12
- TV partner(s): ESPN, ESPN2, ESPNU, Fox Sports 1, FOX, Pac-12 Network, CBS

Regular season
- Season champions: Arizona Wildcats
- Season MVP: Deandre Ayton, Arizona
- Top scorer: Aaron Holiday, UCLA

Tournament
- Champions: Arizona
- Runners-up: USC Trojans
- Finals MVP: Deandre Ayton, Arizona

Basketball seasons
- ← 16–17 18–19 →

2017–18 Pac-12 Conference men's basketball standings
| | Conf. | | | | Overall |
| Team | W | | L | PCT | W | | L | PCT |
|---|---|---|---|---|---|---|---|---|
| No. 12 Arizona † | 14 | – | 4 | .778 | 27 | – | 8 | .771 |
| USC | 12 | – | 6 | .667 | 24 | – | 12 | .667 |
| UCLA | 11 | – | 7 | .611 | 21 | – | 12 | .636 |
| Utah | 11 | – | 7 | .611 | 23 | – | 12 | .657 |
| Stanford | 11 | – | 7 | .611 | 19 | – | 16 | .543 |
| Oregon | 10 | – | 8 | .556 | 23 | – | 13 | .639 |
| Washington | 10 | – | 8 | .556 | 21 | – | 13 | .618 |
| Colorado | 8 | – | 10 | .444 | 17 | – | 15 | .531 |
| Arizona State | 8 | – | 10 | .444 | 20 | – | 12 | .625 |
| Oregon State | 7 | – | 11 | .389 | 16 | – | 16 | .500 |
| Washington State | 4 | – | 14 | .222 | 12 | – | 19 | .387 |
| California | 2 | – | 16 | .111 | 8 | – | 24 | .250 |
† Pac-12 Tournament winner Rankings from AP poll

The 2017–18 Pac-12 Conference men's basketball season began with practices in October 2017 followed by the 2017–18 NCAA Division I men's basketball season on November 10, 2017. The conference schedule began on December 29, 2017. This was the seventh season under the Pac–12 Conference name and the 59th since the conference was established under its current charter as the Athletic Association of Western Universities in 1959. Including the history of the Pacific Coast Conference, which operated from 1915 to 1959 and is considered by the Pac-12 as a part of its own history, this was the Pac-12's 103rd season of basketball.

Arizona won the regular season conference championship by two games over second-place USC.

The Pac-12 tournament was held from March 7–10, 2018 at the T-Mobile Arena in Paradise, Nevada. Arizona defeated USC in the tournament championship. As a result, the Wildcats received the conference' automatic bid to the NCAA tournament.

Arizona, Arizona State, UCLA received bids to the NCAA tournament. The conference achieved an 0–3 record in the tournament.

== Pre-season ==
Pac-12 recruits at the 2017 McDonald's All-American Boys Game

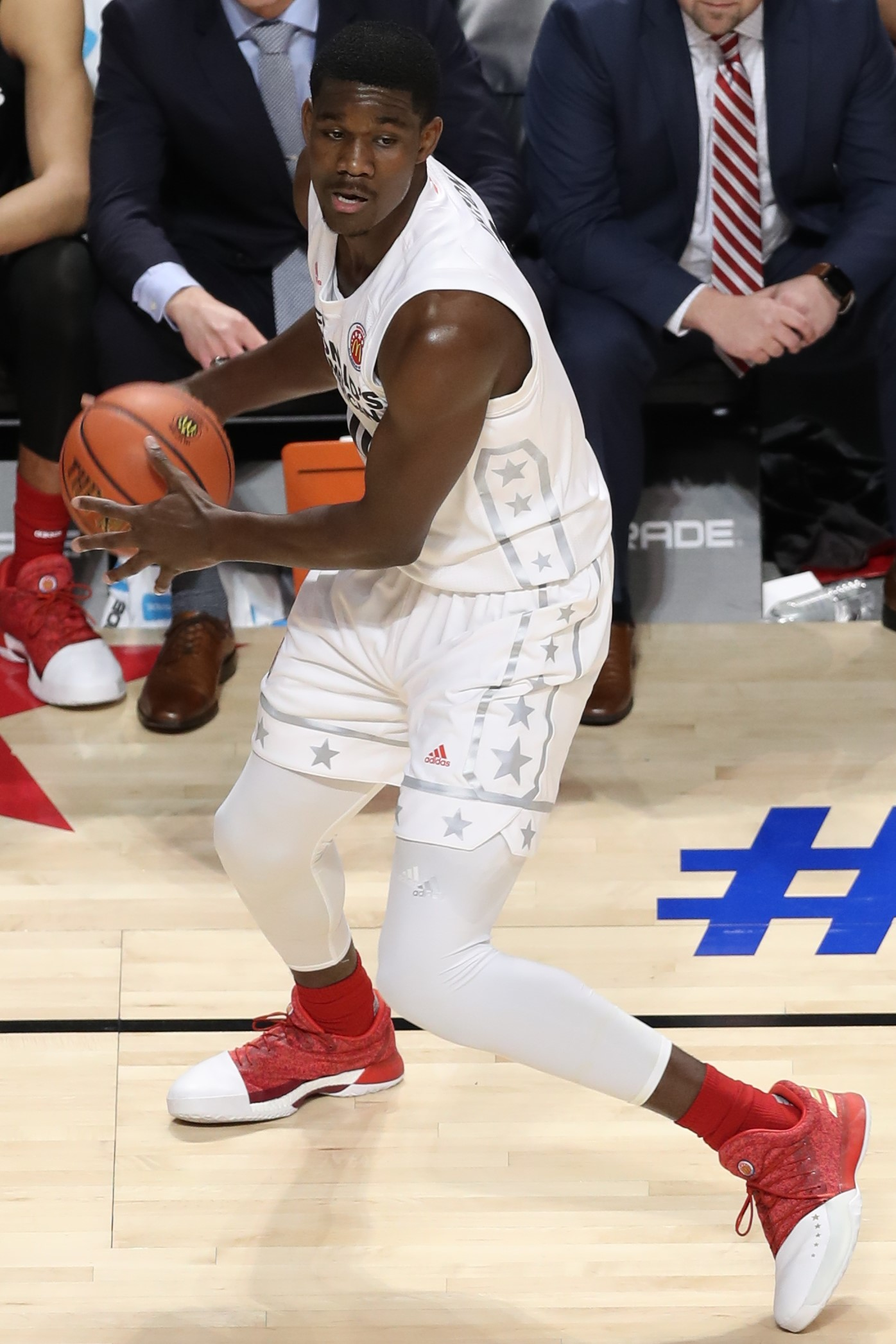
Deandre Ayton, Arizona

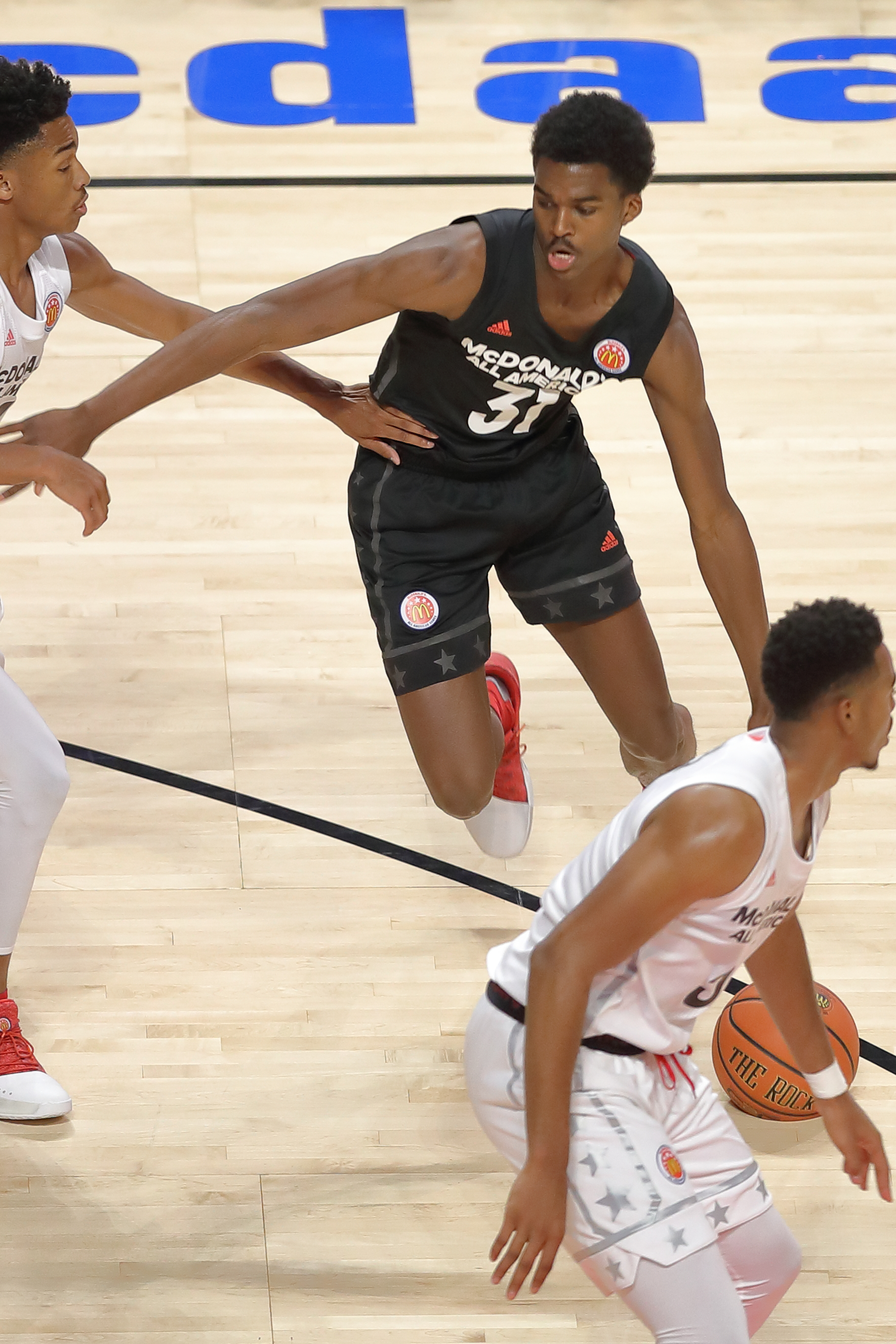
Kris Wilkes, UCLA

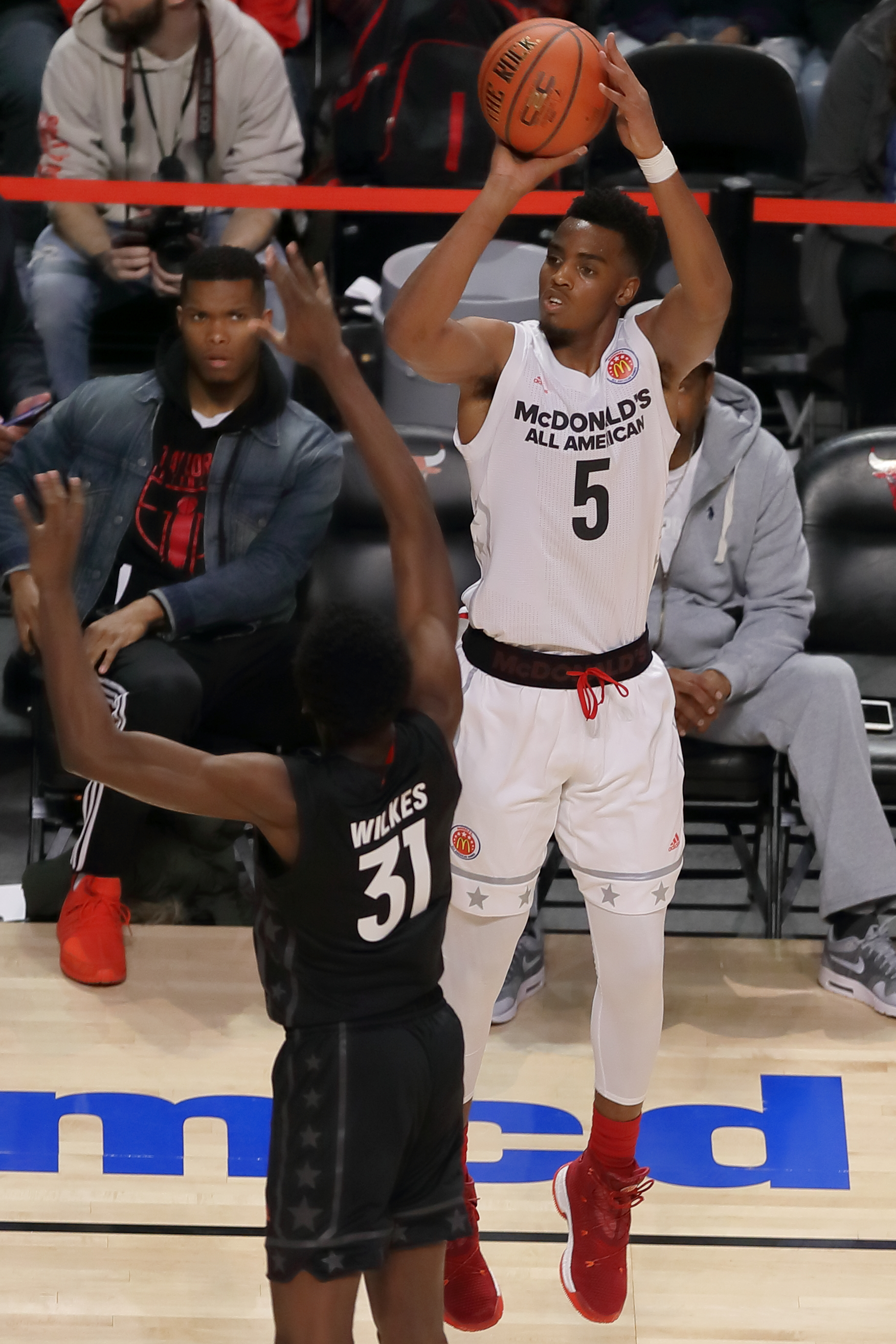
Troy Brown Jr., Oregon

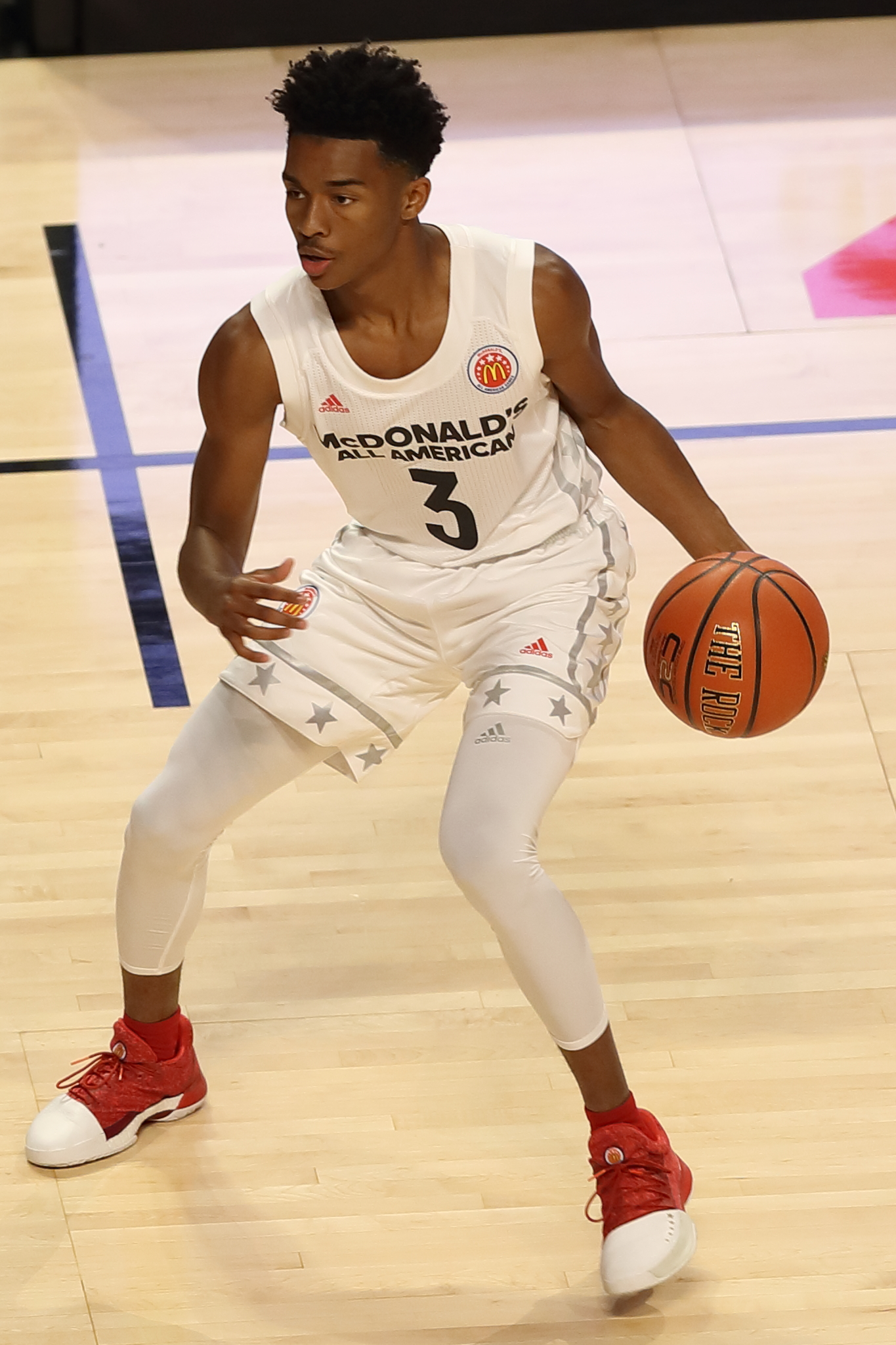
Jaylen Hands, UCLA

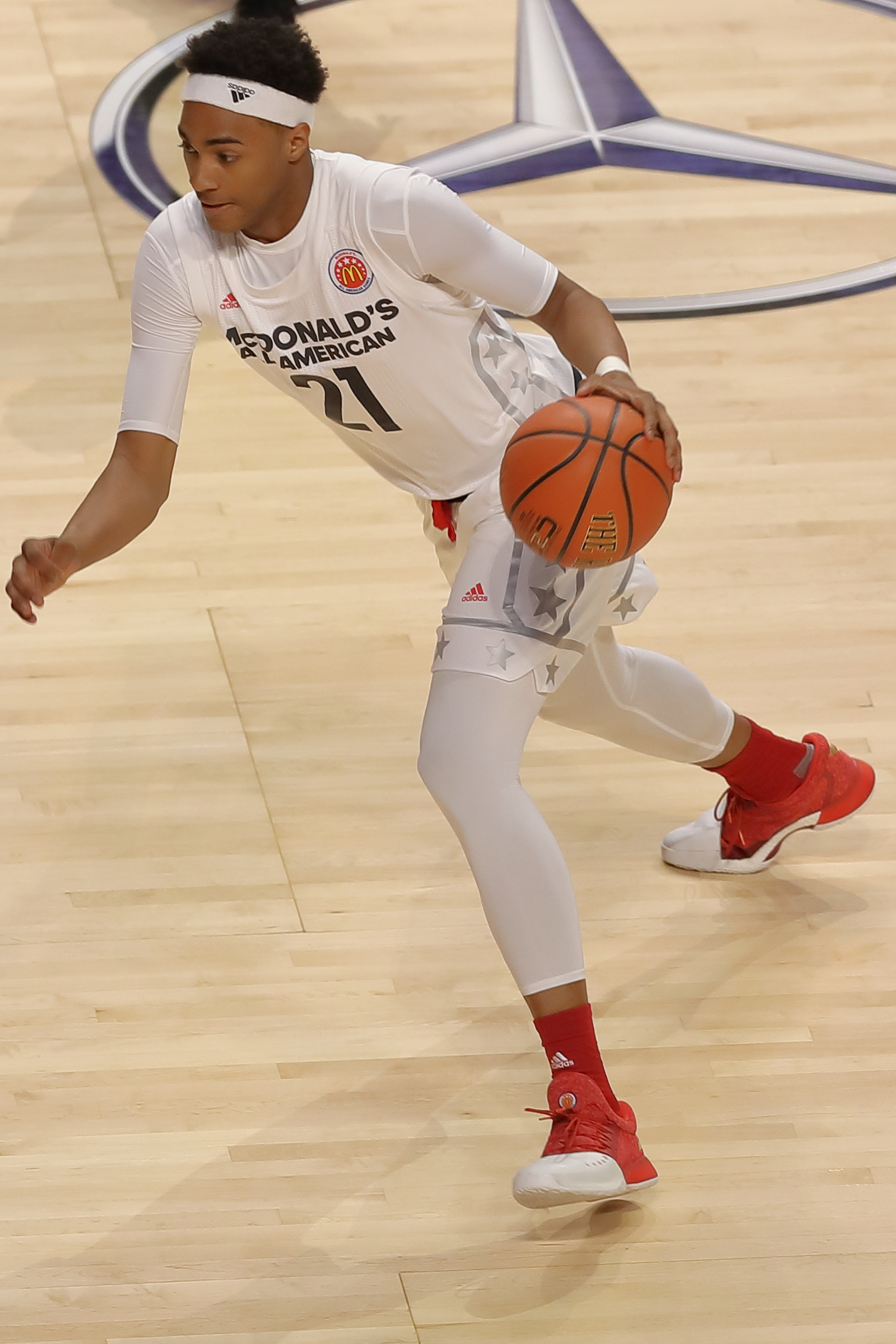
Charles O'Bannon Jr., USC

=== Recruiting classes ===
Rankings
| Team | ESPN | Rivals | Scout | 247Sports | Signees |
|---|---|---|---|---|---|
| Arizona | No. 3 | No. 3 | No. 3 | No. 3 | 5 |
| Arizona State | No. 34 | No. 36 | No. 29 | No. 23 | 2 |
| California | - | - | - | No. 54 | 4 |
| Colorado | No. 39 | No. 25 | No. 27 | No. 24 | 4 |
| Oregon | No. 12 | No. 13 | No. 11 | No. 13 | 4 |
| Oregon State | No. 35 | - | - | No. 48 | 3 |
| Stanford | No. 24 | No. 12 | - | No. 14 | 4 |
| UCLA | No. 4 | No. 5 | No. 5 | No. 4 | 6 |
| USC | No. 18 | No. 30 | - | No. 31 | 3 |
| Utah | - | - | - | No. 51 | 4 |
| Washington | No. 32 | No. 26 | No. 18 | No. 66 | 4 |
| Washington State | - | - | - | No. 119 | 1 |

=== Preseason watchlists ===
Below is a table of notable preseason watch lists.

| | Wooden | Naismith | Robertson | Cousy | West | Erving | Malone | Abdul-Jabbar | Olson | Tisdale |
| Rawle Alkins | ✓ | ✓ | | | | ✓ | | | | |
| Deandre Ayton | ✓ | ✓ | ✓ | | | | ✓ | | | ✓ |
| Bennie Boatwright | | ✓ | | | | | ✓ | | | |
| Troy Brown Jr. | | | | | | ✓ | | | | |
| Shannon Evans II | | | | | | | | | ✓ | |
| Aaron Holiday | ✓ | ✓ | | | | | | | ✓ | |
| Michael Humphrey | | | | | | | | ✓ | | |
| Jordan McLaughlin | ✓ | ✓ | | ✓ | | | | | ✓ | |
| De’Anthony Melton | | | | | ✓ | | | | | |
| Chimezie Metu | ✓ | ✓ | ✓ | | | | | ✓ | ✓ | |
| Kingsley Okoroh | | | | | | | | ✓ | | |
| Dusan Ristic | | | | | | | | ✓ | | |
| Reid Travis | ✓ | ✓ | ✓ | | | | ✓ | | ✓ | |
| Allonzo Trier | ✓ | ✓ | ✓ | | ✓ | | | | ✓ | |
| Thomas Welsh | | | | | | | | ✓ | | |
| Kris Wilkes | | | | | | ✓ | | | | |

=== Preseason All-American teams ===
| | ESPN | CBS | AP | USA; Today | Blue; Ribbon | Athlon; Sports | NBC; Sports | Street & Smith's | Sporting News | Sports; Illustrated |
| Deandre Ayton | 3rd | 3rd | 2nd | HM | 3rd | 2nd | 3rd | | 3rd | HM |
| Beanie Boatright | | | | 3rd | | | | | | |
| Jordan McLaughlin | | | | | | | HM | | | |
| Chimezie Metu | | | | | | | 4th | | | |
| Allonzo Trier | 1st | 2nd | 1st | 1st | 2nd | 2nd | 1st | 2nd | 2nd | 1st |
| Reid Travis | 4th | | | | | | HM | | | |

=== Preseason polls ===
| | AP | Athlon; Sports | Bleacher; Report | Blue Ribbon; Yearbook | CBS Sports | Coaches | ESPN | KenPom | Lindy's; Sports | NBC Sports | SBNation | Street & Smith's | Sports; Illustrated | USBWA |
| Arizona | No. 3 | No. 1 | No. 3 | No. 1 | No. 2 | No. 5 | No. 1 | No. 3 | No. 2 | No. 3 | No. 2 | No. 1 | No. 1 | No. 3 |
| Arizona State | | | | | No. 57 | | No. 93 | | | | | | No. 70 | |
| California | | | | | No. 163 | | No. 100 | | | | | | No. 208 | |
| Colorado | | | | | No. 77 | | No. 95 | | | | | | No. 101 | |
| Oregon | RV | | | | No. 34 | RV | No. 45 | No. 35 | | | | | No. 32 | |
| Oregon State | | | | | No. 82 | | No. 66 | | | | | | No. 99 | |
| Stanford | | | | | No. 42 | | No. 54 | | | | | | No. 118 | |
| UCLA | No. 21 | | No. 18 | No. 22 | No. 20 | No. 18 | No. 34 | No. 29 | No. 14 | No. 14 | No. 15 | | No. 20 | No. 23 |
| USC | No. 10 | No. 7 | No. 8 | No. 11 | No. 8 | No. 11 | No. 11 | No. 12 | No. 12 | No. 12 | No. 8 | | No. 13 | No. 9 |
| Utah | | | | | No. 71 | | No. 55 | | | | | | No. 67 | |
| Washington | | | | | No. 141 | | No. 114 | | | | | | No. 117 | |
| Washington State | | | | | No. 201 | | No. 230 | | | | | | No. 206 | |

=== Pac-12 Media days ===
Men's Basketball Media Preseason Poll
| Place | Team | Points | First place votes |
|---|---|---|---|
| 1. | Arizona | 273 pts | 22 |
| 2. | USC | 251 pts | 1 |
| 3. | UCLA | 223 pts | -- |
| 4. | Oregon | 203 pts | -- |
| 5. | Stanford | 182 pts | -- |
| 6. | Arizona State | 146 pts | -- |
| 7. | Utah | 129 pts | -- |
| 8. | Oregon State | 125 pts | -- |
| 9. | Colorado | 112 pts | -- |
| 10. | Washington | 71 pts | -- |
| 11. | California | 46 pts | -- |
| 12. | Washington State | 33 pts | -- |
(first place votes)

- October 11–12, 2017 – Pac-12 Men's Basketball Media Day, Pac-12 Networks Studios, San Francisco, Calif.

=== Early season tournaments ===
| Team | Tournament | Finish |
|---|---|---|
| Arizona | Battle 4 Atlantis | 8th |
| Arizona State | Las Vegas Invitational | 1st |
| California | Maui Invitational | 8th |
| Colorado | Paradise Jam | 1st |
| Oregon | Phil Knight Invitational – Victory | 6th |
| Oregon State | AdvoCare Invitational | 7th |
| Stanford | Phil Knight Invitational – Motion | 8th |
| UCLA | CBE Hall of Fame Classic | 3rd |
| USC | Diamond Head Classic | 1st |
| Utah | MGM Resorts Main Event | 2nd |
| Washington | 2K Sports Classic | 4th |
| Washington State | Wooden Legacy | 1st |

=== Midseason watchlists ===
Below is a table of notable midseason watch lists.

| | Wooden Midseason | Wooden Late Season | Olson | Robertson | Cousy | West | Erving | Malone | Abdul-Jabbar | Naismith |
| Deandre Ayton | ✓ | ✓ | ✓ | ✓ | | | | ✓ | | ✓ |
| Shannon Evans II | | | ✓ | | | | | | | |
| Tra Holder | ✓ | ✓ | ✓ | ✓ | ✓ | | | | | ✓ |
| Aaron Holiday | ✓ | | | | | | | | | |
| Jordan McLaughlin | | | | | ✓ | | | | | |
| Allonzo Trier | ✓ | ✓ | ✓ | | | ✓ | | | | ✓ |
| Thomas Welsh | | | | | | | | | ✓ | |

=== Final Watchlists ===
Below is a table of notable year end watch lists.

| | John R. Wooden Award | Naismith | Malone | Abdul-Jabbar |
| Deandre Ayton | ✓ | ✓ | ✓ | |
| Thomas Welsh | | | | ✓ |

== Regular season ==
The schedule was released in late September. Before the season, it was announced that for the sixth consecutive season, all regular season conference games and conference tournament games would be broadcast nationally by CBS Sports; FOX Sports; ESPN Inc. family of networks including ESPN, ESPN2 and ESPNU; and the Pac-12 Network.

=== Records against other conferences ===
2017-18 records against non-conference foes as of Dec. 28, 2017:

Regular season

| Power 5 conferences | Record |
|---|---|
| ACC | 1–3 |
| Big Ten | 1–4 |
| Big 12 | 3–4 |
| SEC | 7–2 |
| Power 5 total | 12–13 |
| Other NCAA Division 1 conferences | Record |
| American | 1–5 |
| American East | 1–0 |
| A-10 | 2–1 |
| ASUN | 1–0 |
| Big East | 3–5 |
| Big Sky | 11–4 |
| Big South | 1–0 |
| Big West | 12–4 |
| CAA | 1–0 |
| C-USA | 1–1 |
| Horizon | 2–0 |
| Ivy League | 0–1 |
| MAAC | 2–0 |
| MAC | 2–1 |
| MEAC | 4–0 |
| MVC | 1–0 |
| Mountain West | 10–4 |
| OVC | 3–0 |
| Patriot League | 1–0 |
| SoCon | 2–0 |
| Southland | 4–1 |
| SWAC | 6–0 |
| The Summit | 7–0 |
| Sun Belt | 0–0 |
| WAC | 6–0 |
| WCC | 8–4 |
| Other Division I total | 92–31 |
| Division II total | 0–1 |
| NCAA Division I total | 104–45 |

=== Record against ranked non-conference opponents ===
This is a list of games against ranked opponents only (rankings from the AP Poll):

| Date | Visitor | Home | Site | Significance | Score | Conference record |
|---|---|---|---|---|---|---|
| November 20 | No. 6 Wichita State | California | Lahaina Civic Center • Lahaina, HI | Maui Invitational | L 82–92 | 0–1 |
| November 20 | No. 9 North Carolina | Stanford | Maples Pavilion • Stanford, CA | | L 72–96 | 0–2 |
| November 23 | No. 7 Florida | Stanford | Veterans Memorial Coliseum • Portland, OR | PK80 | L 87–108 | 0–3 |
| November 24 | No. 15 Xavier | Arizona State | Orleans Arena • Las Vegas, NV | Las Vegas Invitational | W 102–86 | 1–3 |
| November 24 | No. 18 Purdue | No. 2 Arizona | Imperial Arena • Nassau, Bahamas | Battle 4 Atlantis | L 64–89 | 1–4 |
| November 24 | No. 21 Saint Mary's | Washington State | Titan Gym • Fullerton, CA | Wooden Legacy | W 84–79 | 2–4 |
| November 26 | No. 18 Texas A&M | No. 10 USC | Galen Center • Los Angeles, CA | | L 59–75 | 2–5 |
| November 26 | No. 7 Texas A&M | Arizona | Talking Stick Resort Arena • Phoenix, AZ | Valley of the Sun Shootout | W 67–64 | 3–5 |
| December 6 | Washington | No. 2 Kansas | Sprint Center • Kansas, KS | | W 74–65 | 4–5 |
| December 9 | Colorado | No. 13 Xavier | Cintas Center • Cincinnati, OH | | L 69–96 | 4–6 |
| December 10 | No. 16 Arizona State | No. 2 Kansas | Allen Fieldhouse • Lawrence, KS | | W 95–85 | 5–6 |
| December 10 | No. 12 Gonzaga | Washington | Hec Edmundson Pavilion • Seattle, WA | | L 70–97 | 5–7 |
| December 16 | No. 25 Cincinnati | UCLA | Pauley Pavilion • Los Angeles, CA | | L 63–77 | 5–8 |
| December 21 | No. 14 Kansas | Stanford | Maples Pavilion • Stanford, CA | | L 54–75 | 5–9 |
| December 23 | No. 7 Kentucky | UCLA | Smoothie King Center • New Orleans, LA | CBS Sports Classic | W 83–75 | 6–9 |

Team rankings are reflective of AP poll when the game was played, not current or final ranking.

=== Conference schedule ===
This table summarizes the head-to-head results between teams in conference play.

| | Arizona | Arizona St | California | Colorado | Oregon | Oregon St | Stanford | UCLA | USC | Utah | Washington | Washington St |
|---|---|---|---|---|---|---|---|---|---|---|---|---|
| vs. Arizona | – | 0–2 | 0–2 | 1–1 | 1–1 | 0–2 | 0–2 | 1–0 | 0–1 | 0–2 | 1–0 | 0–1 |
| vs. Arizona State | 2–0 | – | 0–2 | 1–1 | 2–0 | 1–1 | 2–0 | 0–1 | 0–1 | 1–1 | 1–0 | 0–1 |
| vs. California | 2–0 | 2–0 | – | 1–0 | 1–0 | 0–1 | 1–1 | 2–0 | 2–0 | 1–0 | 2–0 | 2–0 |
| vs. Colorado | 1–1 | 1–1 | 0–1 | – | 1–0 | 1–0 | 0–1 | 1–1 | 2–0 | 1–1 | 2–0 | 1–1 |
| vs. Oregon | 1–1 | 0–2 | 0–1 | 0–1 | – | 1–1 | 1–0 | 1–1 | 2–0 | 1–0 | 0–2 | 1–1 |
| vs. Oregon State | 2–0 | 1–1 | 0–1 | 1–0 | 1–1 | – | 1–0 | 1–1 | 2–0 | 1–0 | 1–1 | 0–2 |
| vs. Stanford | 2–0 | 0–2 | 1–1 | 1–0 | 0–1 | 0–1 | – | 1–1 | 1–1 | 1–0 | 0–2 | 0–2 |
| vs. UCLA | 0–1 | 1–0 | 0–2 | 2–0 | 1–1 | 1–1 | 1–1 | – | 0–2 | 1–1 | 0–1 | 0–1 |
| vs. USC | 1–0 | 1–0 | 0–2 | 0–2 | 0–2 | 0–2 | 1–1 | 2–0 | – | 0–2 | 1–0 | 0–1 |
| vs. Utah | 2–0 | 1–1 | 0–1 | 1–1 | 0–1 | 0–1 | 0–1 | 1–1 | 2–0 | – | 0–2 | 0–2 |
| vs. Washington | 0–1 | 0–1 | 0–2 | 0–2 | 2–0 | 1–1 | 2–0 | 1–0 | 0–1 | 2–0 | – | 0–2 |
| vs. Washington State | 1–0 | 1–0 | 0–2 | 1–1 | 1–1 | 2–0 | 2–0 | 1–0 | 1–0 | 2–0 | 2–0 | – |
| Total | 14–4 | 8–10 | 2–16 | 8–10 | 10–8 | 7–11 | 11–7 | 11–7 | 12–6 | 11–7 | 10–8 | 4–14 |

=== Points scored ===
| Team | For | Against | Difference |
|---|---|---|---|
| Arizona | 2514 | 2225 | 289 |
| Arizona State | 2504 | 2238 | 266 |
| California | 2108 | 2407 | -299 |
| Colorado | 2143 | 2169 | -26 |
| Oregon | 2440 | 2217 | 223 |
| Oregon State | 2222 | 2124 | 98 |
| Stanford | 2351 | 2322 | 29 |
| UCLA | 2466 | 2287 | 179 |
| USC | 2424 | 2209 | 215 |
| Utah | 2139 | 1994 | 145 |
| Washington | 2311 | 2254 | 57 |
| Washington State | 2208 | 2347 | -139 |

Through March 5, 2018

=== Rankings ===
The Pac-12 had three teams ranked and one other receiving votes in the preseason Coaches' Poll & AP Poll. There was no coaches poll during week 2, and officially started voting during week 3.

| | Improvement in ranking |
| | Drop in ranking |
| RV | Received votes but were not ranked in Top 25 |
| NV | No votes received |

| | | Pre | Wk 2 | Wk 3 | Wk 4 | Wk 5 | Wk 6 | Wk 7 | Wk 8 | Wk 9 | Wk 10 | Wk 11 | Wk 12 | Wk 13 | ! Wk 14 | Wk 15 | Wk 16 | Wk 17 | Wk 18 | Wk 19 | Final |
|---|---|---|---|---|---|---|---|---|---|---|---|---|---|---|---|---|---|---|---|---|---|
| Arizona | AP | 3 | 3 | 2 | RV | RV | 23 | 18 | 17 | 14 | 17 | 14 | 11 | 9 | 13 | 17 | 14 | 19 | 15 | 12 | – |
| Arizona | C | 5 | | 4 | RV | RV | 23 | 19 | 18 | 16 | 21 | 17 | 12 | 9 | 13 | 19 | 14 | 22 | 17 | 15 | RV |
| Arizona State | AP | NV | NV | 20 | 16 | 5 | 4 | 3 | 3 | 4 | 11 | 16 | 21 | 25 | RV | 25 | RV | NV | NV | NV | – |
| Arizona State | C | NV | | NV | 21 | 17 | 6 | 4 | 4 | 6 | 11 | 14 | 19 | 23 | RV | 22 | 25 | RV | RV | NV | NV |
| California | AP | NV | NV | NV | NV | NV | NV | NV | NV | NV | NV | NV | NV | NV | NV | NV | NV | NV | NV | NV | – |
| California | C | NV | | NV | NV | NV | NV | NV | NV | NV | NV | NV | NV | NV | NV | NV | NV | NV | NV | NV | NV |
| Colorado | AP | NV | NV | NV | NV | NV | NV | NV | NV | NV | NV | NV | NV | NV | NV | NV | NV | NV | NV | NV | – |
| Colorado | C | NV | | NV | NV | NV | NV | NV | NV | NV | NV | NV | NV | NV | NV | NV | NV | NV | NV | NV | NV |
| Oregon | AP | RV | RV | RV | NV | NV | NV | NV | NV | NV | NV | NV | NV | NV | NV | NV | NV | NV | NV | NV | – |
| Oregon | C | RV | | RV | NV | NV | NV | NV | NV | NV | NV | NV | NV | NV | NV | NV | NV | NV | NV | NV | NV |
| Oregon State | AP | NV | NV | NV | NV | NV | NV | NV | NV | NV | NV | NV | NV | NV | NV | NV | NV | NV | NV | NV | – |
| Oregon State | C | NV | | NV | NV | NV | NV | NV | NV | NV | NV | NV | NV | NV | NV | NV | NV | NV | NV | NV | NV |
| Stanford | AP | NV | NV | NV | NV | NV | NV | NV | NV | NV | NV | NV | NV | NV | NV | NV | NV | NV | NV | NV | – |
| Stanford | C | NV | | NV | NV | NV | NV | NV | NV | NV | NV | NV | NV | NV | NV | NV | NV | NV | NV | NV | NV |
| UCLA | AP | 21 | 23 | 23 | RV | RV | RV | NV | RV | RV | NV | NV | NV | NV | NV | NV | RV | NV | NV | RV | – |
| UCLA | C | 18 | | 23 | 25 | 23 | RV | NV | RV | RV | NV | RV | NV | NV | NV | RV | RV | NV | NV | NV | NV |
| USC | AP | 10 | 10 | 10 | 14 | 25 | NV | NV | NV | NV | NV | NV | NV | RV | NV | NV | NV | RV | NV | RV | – |
| USC | C | 11 | | 10 | 18 | 25 | NV | NV | NV | NV | NV | NV | NV | RV | RV | NV | NV | NV | NV | NV | NV |
| Utah | AP | NV | NV | NV | NV | NV | NV | NV | NV | NV | NV | NV | NV | NV | NV | NV | NV | NV | NV | NV | – |
| Utah | C | NV | | NV | NV | NV | NV | NV | NV | NV | NV | NV | NV | NV | NV | NV | NV | NV | NV | NV | NV |
| Washington | AP | NV | NV | NV | NV | NV | NV | NV | NV | NV | NV | NV | NV | NV | RV | NV | NV | NV | NV | NV | – |
| Washington | C | NV | | NV | NV | NV | NV | NV | NV | NV | NV | NV | NV | NV | RV | NV | NV | NV | NV | NV | NV |
| Washington State | AP | NV | NV | NV | RV | RV | NV | NV | NV | NV | NV | NV | NV | NV | NV | NV | NV | NV | NV | NV | – |
| Washington State | C | NV | | NV | RV | RV | NV | NV | NV | NV | NV | NV | NV | NV | NV | NV | NV | NV | NV | NV | NV |

== Head coaches ==
=== Coaching changes ===
On March 15, 2017, California head coach Cuonzo Martin resigned. On March 24, the school hired assistant coach Wyking Jones as the new head coach. On March 16, 2017, Washington fired Lorenzo Romar after fifteen years as head coach. On March 19, 2017, the school hired Mike Hopkins as head coach.

=== Coaches ===
Note: Stats shown are before the beginning of the season. Overall and Pac-12 records are from time at current school.

| Team | Head coach | Previous job | Seasons at school | Overall record | Pac-12 record | Pac-12 titles | NCAA tournaments | NCAA Final Fours | NCAA Championships |
|---|---|---|---|---|---|---|---|---|---|
| Arizona | Sean Miller | Xavier | 9th | 244–73 (.770) | 121–41 (.747) | 5 | 10 | 0 | 0 |
| Arizona State | Bobby Hurley | Buffalo | 3rd | 47–41 (.534) | 17–30 (.362) | 0 | 0 | 0 | 0 |
| California | Wyking Jones | California (assistant) | 1st | 8–17 (.320) | 2–10 (.167) | 0 | 0 | 0 | 0 |
| Colorado | Tad Boyle | Northern Colorado | 8th | 163–105 (.608) | 70-66 (.515) | 0 | 3 | 0 | 0 |
| Oregon | Dana Altman | Creighton | 8th | 203–79 (.720) | 91–47 (.659) | 2 | 5 | 0 | 0 |
| Oregon State | Wayne Tinkle | Montana | 4th | 53–65 (.449) | 22–43 (.338) | 0 | 4 | 0 | 0 |
| Stanford | Jerod Haase | UAB | 2nd | 27–29 (.482) | 13–17 (.433) | 0 | 0 | 0 | 0 |
| UCLA | Steve Alford | New Mexico | 5th | 113–52 (.685) | 52–32 (.619) | 0 | 3 | 0 | 0 |
| USC | Andy Enfield | Florida Gulf Coast | 5th | 87–72 (.547) | 32–52 (.381) | 0 | 2 | 0 | 0 |
| Utah | Larry Krystkowiak | New Jersey Nets (assistant) | 7th | 129–94 (.578) | 59–60 (.496) | 0 | 4 | 0 | 0 |
| Washington | Mike Hopkins | Syracuse (assistant) | 1st | 17–7 (.708) | 7–4 (.636) | 0 | 0 | 0 | 0 |
| Washington State | Ernie Kent | Oregon | 4th | 44–72 (.381) | 15–50 (.231) | 0 | 6 | 0 | 0 |

Notes:

- Overall and Pac-12 records, conference titles, etc. are from time at current school and are through the end the 2017–18 season.
- NCAA tournament appearances are from time at current school only.
- NCAA Final Fours and Championship include time at other schools.

== Postseason ==
=== Pac-12 tournament ===
The conference tournament was scheduled for Wednesday–Saturday March 7–10, 2018 at the T-Mobile Arena, Paradise, NV. The top four teams had a bye on the first day, March 7, 2018. Teams were seeded by conference record, with ties broken by record between the tied teams followed by record against the regular-season champion, if necessary.

First round Wednesday, March 7
8 | Colorado | 97
9 | Arizona State | 85
5 | Stanford | 76
12 | California | 58
7 | Washington | 66
10 | Oregon State | 69*
6 | Oregon | 64*
11 | Washington State | 62

Quarterfinals; Thursday, March 8
1 | Arizona | 83
8 | Colorado | 67
4 | UCLA | 88
5 | Stanford | 77
2 | USC | 61
10 | Oregon State | 48
3 | Utah | 66
6 | Oregon | 68

Semifinals; Friday, March 9
1 | Arizona | 78*
4 | UCLA | 67
2 | USC | 74
6 | Oregon | 54

Championship; Saturday, March 10
1 | Arizona | 75
2 | USC | 61

* denotes overtime period

=== NCAA tournament ===
Three teams from the conference were selected to participate: Arizona, UCLA and Arizona State.

| Seed | Region | School | First Four | First round | Second round | Sweet Sixteen | Elite Eight | Final Four | Championship |
|---|---|---|---|---|---|---|---|---|---|
| No. 4 | South | Arizona | N/A | eliminated by No. 13 Buffalo 68–89 | – | – | – | – | – |
| No. 11 | Midwest | Arizona State | eliminated by No. 11 Syracuse 60–56 | – | – | – | – | – | – |
| No. 11 | East | UCLA | eliminated by No. 11 St. Bonaventure 65–58 | – | – | – | – | – | – |
| | 3 Bids | W-L (%): | 0–2 (.000) | 0–1 (.000) | 0–0 (–) | 0–0 (–) | 0–0 (–) | 0–0 (–) | TOTAL: 0–3 (.000) |

=== National Invitation Tournament ===
Five teams from the conference were selected to participate: USC, Utah, Stanford, Oregon & Washington.

| Seed | Bracket | School | First round | Second round | Quarterfinals | Semifinals | Finals |
|---|---|---|---|---|---|---|---|
| 1 | USC | USC | defeated No. 8 UNC Asheville 103–98 | eliminated by No. 4 Western Kentucky 75–79 | | | |
| 2 | Saint Mary's | Utah | defeated No. 7 UC Davis 69–59 | defeated No. 3 LSU 95–71 | defeated No. 1 Saint Mary's 67–58^{OT} | defeated No. 4 Western Kentucky 69–64 | eliminated by No. 4 Penn State 66–82 |
| 3 | USC | Stanford | defeated No. 6 BYU 86–83 | eliminated by No. 2 Oklahoma State 65–71 | | | |
| 3 | Notre Dame | Oregon | defeated No. 6 Rider 99–86 | eliminated by No. 2 Marquette 92–101 | | | |
| 5 | Saint Mary's | Washington | defeated No. 4 Boise State 77–74 | eliminated by No. 1 Saint Mary's 81–85 | | | |
| | 5 Bids | W-L (%): | 5–0 (1.000) | 1–4 (.200) | 1–0 (1.000) | 1–0 (1.000) | TOTAL: 8–5 (.615) |

Index to colors and formatting
Pac-12 member won
Pac-12 member lost

== Awards and honors ==
=== Players of the Week ===
Throughout the conference regular season, the Pac-12 offices named one or two players of the week each Monday.

| Week | Player of the Week | School | Ref. |
|---|---|---|---|
| Nov. 13 | Allonzo Trier | Arizona | |
| Nov. 20 | Tra Holder | Arizona State | |
| Nov. 27 | Tra Holder (2) | Arizona State | |
| Dec. 4 | Deandre Ayton | Arizona | |
| Dec. 11 | Shannon Evans II | Arizona State | |
| Dec. 18 | Jordan McLaughlin | USC | |
| Dec. 25 | Aaron Holiday | UCLA | |
| Jan. 1 | Deandre Ayton (2) | Arizona | |
| Jan. 8 | McKinley Wright IV | Colorado | |
| Jan. 15 | Daejon Davis | Stanford | |
| Jan. 22 | Justin Bibbins | Utah | |
| Jan. 29 | Dušan Ristić | Arizona | |
| Feb. 5 | Noah Dickerson | Washington | |
| Feb. 12 | Tres Tinkle | Oregon State | |
| Feb. 19 | Aaron Holiday (2) | UCLA | |
| Feb. 26 | Reid Travis | Stanford | |
| Mar. 5 | Aaron Holiday (3) | UCLA | |

==== Totals per school ====
| School | Total |
|---|---|
| Arizona | 4 |
| Arizona State | 3 |
| UCLA | 3 |
| Stanford | 2 |
| Colorado | 1 |
| Oregon State | 1 |
| USC | 1 |
| Utah | 1 |
| Washington | 1 |

=== All-Americans ===
AP

First Team

- Deandre Ayton (Arizona)

Honorable Mention

- Aaron Holiday (UCLA)
- Allonzo Trier (Arizona)
USBWA

First Team

- Deandre Ayton (Arizona)
NABC

First Team

- Deandre Ayton (Arizona)
Sporting News

First Team

- Deandre Ayton (Arizona)

Third Team

- Aaron Holiday (UCLA)

=== All-District ===
USBWA

District IX: Player of the Year

- Deandre Ayton (Arizona)

District IX: All-District Team

- Deandre Ayton (Arizona)
- Tra Holder (Arizona State)
- Aaron Holiday (UCLA)
- Jordan McLaughlin (USC)
- Chimezie Metu, USC
- Reid Travis, (Stanford)
- Allonzo Trier, (Arizona)
- Thomas Welsh, (UCLA)
NABC

District 20
First team

- Deandre Ayton, Arizona
- Aaron Holiday, UCLA
- Jordan McLaughlin, USC
- Reid Travis, Stanford
- Tra Holder, Arizona State

Second team

- Allonzo Trier, Arizona
- Noah Dickerson, Washington
- Thomas Welsh, UCLA
- Chimezie Metu, USC
- Justin Bibbins, Utah

=== Conference awards ===
Voting was by conference coaches.

==== Individual awards ====
Pac-12 individual awards
| Award | Recipient(s) |
|---|---|
| Player of The Year | Deandre Ayton, Fr., Arizona |
| Coach of the Year | Mike Hopkins, Washington |
| Defensive Player of The Year | Matisse Thybulle, Jr., Washington |
| Freshman of The Year | Deandre Ayton, Fr., Arizona |
| Scholar-Athlete of the Year | Dorian Pickens, Sr., Stanford |
| Most Improved Player of The Year | Robert Franks, Jr., Washington State |
| Sixth Man of The Year | Dominique Collier, So., Colorado & Remy Martin, Fr., Arizona State |

==== All-Pac-12 ====
First Team

| Name | School | Pos. | Yr. | Ht., wt. | Hometown (last school) |
|---|---|---|---|---|---|
| Deandre Ayton‡ | Arizona | F | Fr. | 7-1, 250 | Nassau, Bahamas (Hillcrest Prep) |
| Justin Bibbins | Utah | G | Sr. | 5-8, 150 | Carson, Calif. (Bishop Montegomery) |
| Noah Dickerson | Washington | F | Jr. | 5-8, 150 | Atlanta, Ga. (Montverde Academy) |
| Tra Holder | Arizona State | G | Sr. | 5-8, 150 | Los Angeles, Calif. (Brentwood School) |
| Aaron Holiday | UCLA | G | Jr. | 5-8, 150 | Chatsworth, Calif. (Campbell Hall) |
| Jordan McLaughlin | USC | G | Sr. | 5-8, 150 | Etiwanda, Calif. (Etiwanda High) |
| Chimezie Metu† | USC | F | Jr. | 5-8, 150 | Lawndale, Calif. (Lawndale High) |
| Tres Tinkle | Oregon State | F | R-So. | 5-8, 150 | Missoula, Mont. (Hellgate High School) |
| Reid Travis†† | Stanford | F | R-Jr. | 6-8, 150 | Minneapolis, Minn. (De La Salle) |
| Allonzo Trier† | Arizona | G | Jr. | 6-5, 205 | Seattle, Wash.(Findlay Prep (Nev.)) |

- ‡ Pac-12 Player of the Year
- †† two-time All-Pac-12 First Team honoree
- † two-time All-Pac-12 honoree

Second Team

| Name | School | Pos. | Yr. | Ht., wt. |
|---|---|---|---|---|
| David Collette | Utah | F | Sr. | 6-10, 220 |
| George King | Colorado | G | R-Sr. | 6-2, 200 |
| Payton Pritchard | Oregon | G | R-Sr. | 6-10, 230 |
| Dusan Ristic | Arizona | C | Sr. | 7-0, 245 |
| Thomas Welsh | UCLA | C | Sr. | 7-0, 245 |

Honorable Mention

- Rawle Alkins (ARIZ, G), Shannon Evans II (ASU, G), Robert Franks (WSU, F), Jaylen Nowell (WASH, G), Dorian Pickens (STAN, G), McKinley Wright IV (COLO, G)

==== All-Freshman Team ====
| Name | School | Pos. | Ht., wt. |
|---|---|---|---|
| Deandre Ayton‡ | Arizona | F | 7-1, 250 |
| Daejon Davis | Stanford | G | 6-3, 175 |
| Jaylen Nowell | Washington | G | 6-4, 190 |
| Kris Wilkes | UCLA | G | 6-8, 195 |
| McKinley Wright IV | Colorado | G | 6-0, 185 |

‡ Pac-12 Freshman of the Year

Honorable Mention

- Troy Brown (ORE, F)

==== All-Defensive Team ====
| Name | School | Pos. | Yr. | Ht., wt. |
|---|---|---|---|---|
| Deandre Ayton | Arizona | F | Fr. | 7-1, 250 |
| Aaron Holiday | UCLA | G | Jr. | 5-8, 150 |
| Jordan McLaughlin | USC | G | Sr. | 5-8, 150 |
| Matisse Thybulle‡ | Washington | F | Jr. | 6-5, 195 |
| Kenny Wooten | Oregon | F | Fr. | 6-9, 220 |

‡Pac-12 Defensive Player of the Year

Honorable Mention

- Chimezie Metu (USC, F), McKinley Wright IV (COLO, G).

==== All-Academic team ====
First Team

| Name | School | Pos. | Ht., wt. | GPA | Major |
|---|---|---|---|---|---|
| Nick Hamilton | California | G | 6-4, 185 | 3.75 | Media studies & legal studies |
| Dorian Pickens‡††† | Stanford | G | 6-5, 210 | 3.42 | Communication |
| Jeff Pollard | Washington State | F | 6-9, 240 | 3.72 | Undeclared |
| Gligorije Rakocevic | Oregon State | F | 6-11, 250 | 3.70 | Digital communication arts |
| Stephen Thompson Jr. | Oregon State | G | 6-4, 190 | 3.73 | Digital communication arts |

- ‡ indicates player was Pac-12 Scholar-Athlete of the Year
- †† two-time Pac-12 All-Academic honoree
- ††† three-time Pac-12 All-Academic honoree

Second Team

| Name | School | Pos. | Ht., wt. | GPA | Major |
|---|---|---|---|---|---|
| Malachi Flynn | Washington State | G | 6-1, 170 | 3.48 | Undeclared |
| Jayce Johnson | Utah | C | 7-0, 235 | 3.49 | Psychology |
| Chimezie Metu | USC | F | 6-11, 225 | 3.18 | Law, history & culture |
| Tres Tinkle†† | Oregon State | G | 6-8, 220 | 3.42 | Speech communication |
| Parker Van Dyke†† | Utah | G | 6-3, 181 | 3.26 | Economics |

- †† two-time Pac-12 All-Academic honoree

Honorable Mention

- Milan Acquaah (WSU, R-Fr.), Robert Cartwright (STAN, R-Jr.), David Collette (UTAH, Sr.), Drew Eubanks (OSU, Jr.), Shannon Evans II (ASU, Sr.), Kodi Justice (ASU, Sr.), Jordan McLaughlin (USC, Sr.), Alex Olesinski (UCLA, R-So.), Kodye Pugh (STAN, R-Fr.), Keith Smith (ORE, So.), Thomas Welsh (UCLA, Sr.)

== 2018 NBA draft ==
| Round | Pick | Player | Position | Nationality | Team | School/club team |
|---|---|---|---|---|---|---|
| 1 | 1 | Deandre Ayton | PF | Bahamas | Phoenix Suns | Arizona (Fr.) |
| 1 | 15 | Troy Brown Jr. | SF | United States | Washington Wizards | Oregon (Fr.) |
| 1 | 23 | Aaron Holiday | PG | United States | Indiana Pacers | UCLA (Jr.) |
| 2 | 46 | De'Anthony Melton | SG | United States | Houston Rockets | USC (So.) |
| 2 | 49 | Chimezie Metu | C | United States | San Antonio Spurs | USC (Jr.) |
| 2 | 58 | Thomas Welsh | C | United States | Denver Nuggets | UCLA (Sr.) |
| 2 | 59 | George King | SF | United States | Phoenix Suns | Colorado (Sr.) |

== Home game attendance ==
| Team | Stadium | Capacity | Game 1 | Game 2 | Game 3 | Game 4 | Game 5 | Game 6 | Game 7 | Game 8 | Game 9 | Game 10 | Game 11 | Game 12 | Game 13 | Game 14 | Game 15 | Game 16 | Game 17 | Game 18 | Game 19 | Total | Average | % of capacity |
|---|---|---|---|---|---|---|---|---|---|---|---|---|---|---|---|---|---|---|---|---|---|---|---|---|
| Arizona | McKale Center | 14,644 | **14,644†** | 13,496 | 14,301 | 13,626 | **14,644†** | 14,048 | 14,392 | **14,644†** | **14,644†** | **14,644†** | **14,644†** | **14,644†** | **14,644†** | **14,644†** | **14,644†** | **14,644†** | | | | 230,947 | 14,434 | 98.56% |
| Arizona State | Wells Fargo Arena | 14,100 | 5,697 | 6,640 | 6,189 | 5,394 | 8,682 | 10,797 | 9,308 | 10,646 | 13,693 | 13,459 | 11,536 | 13,943 | 12,377 | 14,025 | **14,233†** | 11,737 | 11,895 | | | 180,251 | 10,603 | 75.19% |
| California | Haas Pavilion | 11,858 | 7,083 | 6,405 | 6,102 | 6,177 | 7,831 | 7,813 | 6,758 | 6,589 | 6,915 | 8,888† | 7,721 | 8,107 | 7,531 | 8,581 | 8,482 | 6,552 | 7,851 | | | 125,386 | 7,376 | 62.20% |
| Colorado | Coors Events Center | 11,064 | 7,740 | 6,451 | 7,427 | 6,610 | 6,512 | 6,933 | 7,740 | 8,519 | 7,477 | 8,787† | 7,645 | 6,385 | 8,323 | 7,008 | 8,176 | | | | | 111,733 | 7,449 | 67.32% |
| Oregon | Matthew Knight Arena | 12,364 | 7,232 | 6,428 | 8,100 | 6,916 | 7,688 | 7,153 | 6,249 | 6,905 | 6,908 | 9,661 | 7,458 | 9,202 | **12,364†** | **12,364†** | 9,938 | 9,419 | 9,940 | **12,364†** | | 156,289 | 8,683 | 70.22% |
| Oregon State | Gill Coliseum | 9,604 | 4,588 | 3,874 | 5,438 | 3,985 | 3,571 | 4,344 | 3,900 | 8,110† | 4,481 | 4,751 | 6,482 | 5,330 | 6,301 | 4,235 | 5,630 | 4,963 | 6,147 | | | 86,130 | 5,066 | 52.74% |
| Stanford | Maples Pavilion | 7,233 | 6,276 | 3,103 | 2,799 | 2,998 | **7,233†** | 3,145 | 3,303 | 4,031 | 4,293 | 4,497 | 4,087 | 4,014 | 6,079 | 3,601 | 4,894 | 3,625 | 5,233 | | | 73,211 | 4,307 | 59.54% |
| UCLA | Pauley Pavilion | 13,800 | 6,782 | 7,035 | 8,329 | 5,973 | 6,109 | 10,018 | 5,767 | 8,089 | 7,639 | 8,739 | 10,164 | 8,028 | 10,519 | 12,837 | 8,890 | 13,001† | | | | 137,919 | 8,620 | 62.46% |
| USC | Galen Center | 10,258 | 6,327 | 2,402 | 3,125 | 5,347 | 2,712 | 3,519 | 4,041 | 3,104 | 2,518 | 3,669 | 4,822 | 4,116 | 6,144 | 4,322 | 4,542 | **10,258†** | | | | 70,968 | 4,436 | 43.24% |
| Utah | Jon M. Huntsman Center | 15,000 | 9,887 | 9,690 | 12,064 | 13,264 | 13,896 | 13,125 | 13,543 | 12,123 | 12,378 | 11,241 | 14,038 | 14,358† | 13,141 | 13,598 | 13,751 | | | | | 190,097 | 12,673 | 84.48% |
| Washington | Alaska Airlines Arena | 10,000 | 5,883 | 5,609 | 6,428 | 5,328 | 4,858 | 4,903 | 9,749 | 4,856 | 4,452 | 5,915 | 5,804 | 8,256 | **10,000†** | 6,904 | **10,000†** | 8,170 | 9,258 | 6,480 | 9,912 | 133,016 | 7,001 | 70.01% |
| Washington State | Beasley Coliseum | 11,671 | 2,424 | 2,340 | 2,129 | 3,183 | 2,240 | 4,165 | 2,178 | 3,477 | 2,540 | 3,178 | 4,607† | 2,803 | 2,249 | 2,924 | 2,592 | 3,148 | | | | 46,177 | 2,886 | 24.72% |
| Total | | 11,800 | | | | | | | | | | | | | | | | | | | | 1,542,124 | 7,749 | 66.66% |

Bold – At or exceed capacity
†Season high
