= Nahziah Carter =

American basketball player

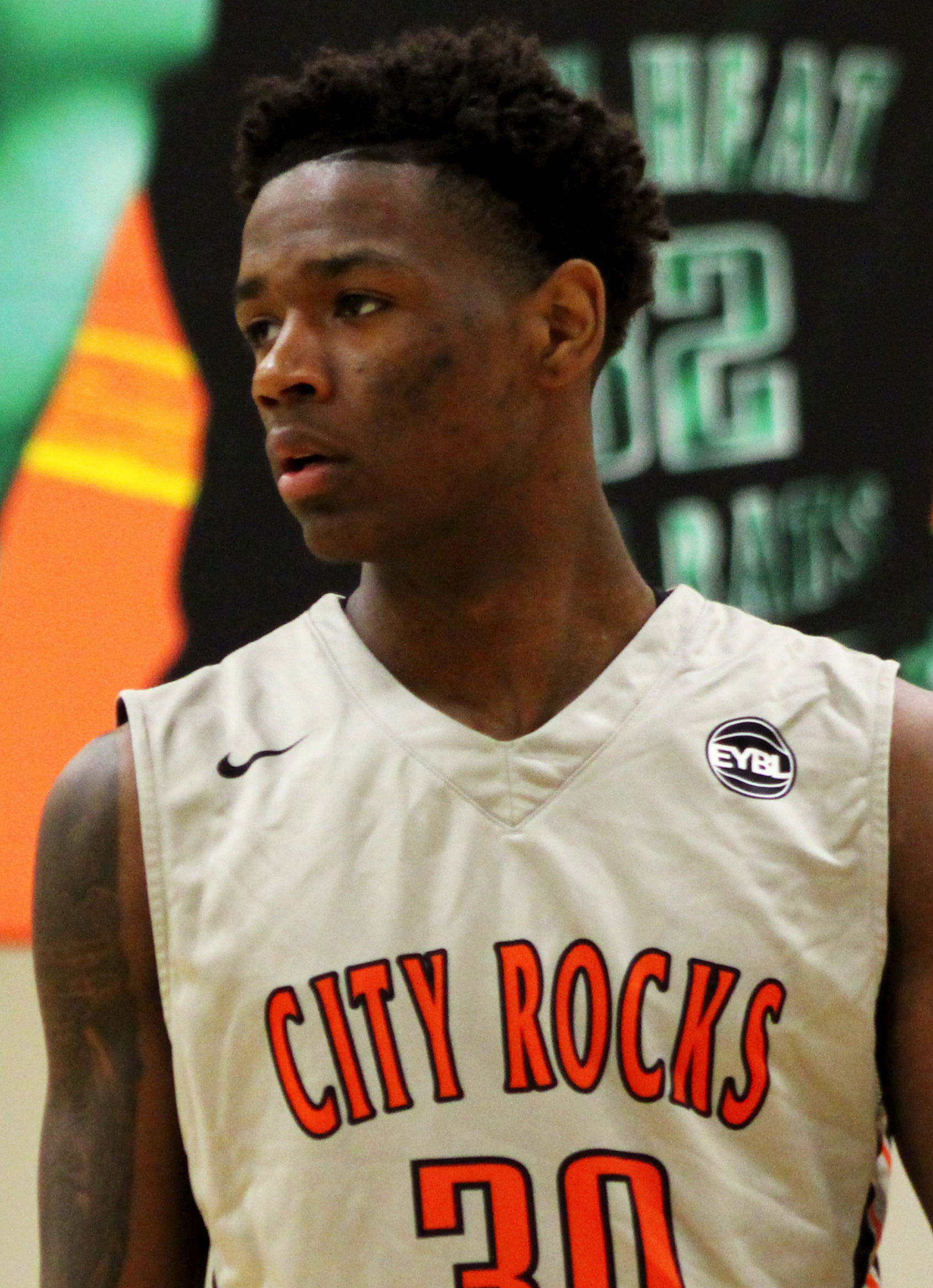
- Carter at the Nike EYBL in April 2017

No. 23 – Gaiteros del Zulia
- Position: Shooting guard / small forward
- League: Superliga Profesional de Baloncesto

Personal information
- Born: August 24, 1999 (age 27) Rochester, New York
- Listed height: 6 ft 6 in (1.98 m)
- Listed weight: 205 lb (93 kg)

Career information
- High school: Bishop Kearney (Irondequoit, New York)
- College: Washington (2017–2020)
- NBA draft: 2021: undrafted

Career history
- 2023–2025: Reales de La Vega
- 2025–present: Gaiteros del Zulia

Nahziah Carter (born August 24, 1999) is an American professional basketball player for the Gaiteros del Zulia of the Superliga Profesional de Baloncesto (SPB). He played college basketball for the Washington Huskies.

== Early life ==
Carter grew up in Rochester, New York, and attended Bishop Kearney High School. He averaged 15.1 points per game as a junior. As a senior, Carter averaged 19.1 points, 3.0 rebounds and 1.6 assists per game. Rated a four-star recruit, Carter originally committed to play college basketball at Dayton but re-opened his recruitment after Archie Miller left to become the head coach at Indiana. Carter eventually committed to play at Washington over offers from Georgetown and Boston College.

== College career ==
As a true freshman, Carter averaged 5.1 points and 1.7 rebounds per game. He averaged 8.1 points and 2.4 rebounds per game and scored at least ten points in 15 games as a key reserve in his sophomore season.

Carter entered his junior season as the Huskies' leading returning scorer. He scored a career-high 23 points with seven rebounds in the Huskies season opening win over 16th-ranked Baylor. Carter scored 18 points and grabbed 12 rebounds against Tennessee for his first career double-double in a 75–62 loss. He was the Huskies's third-leading scorer and rebounder as a junior with 12.2 points and 4.9 rebounds per game.

Carter was suspended from team activities on October 15, 2020, due to two separate sexual assault allegations that were found to be true. On December 4, he announced he was leaving Washington to turn professional.

He was on the Atlanta Hawks roster for the 2021 NBA Summer League.

== Career statistics ==
Legend
GP	Games played	GS	Games started	MPG	Minutes per game
FG%	Field goal percentage	3P%	3-point field goal percentage	FT%	Free throw percentage
RPG	Rebounds per game	APG	Assists per game	SPG	Steals per game
BPG	Blocks per game	PPG	Points per game	**Bold**	Career high

=== College ===
Year	Team	GP	GS	MPG	FG%	3P%	FT%	RPG	APG	SPG	BPG	PPG
2017–18	Washington	34	2	14.2	.469	**.409**	.618	1.7	.5	.8	.4	5.1
2018–19	Washington	**36**	0	20.6	**.478**	.310	**.638**	2.4	.9	.4	.2	8.1
2019–20	Washington	32	**31**	**31.0**	.433	.366	.617	**4.9**	**1.5**	**1.4**	**.8**	**12.2**
Career		102	33	21.7	.455	.357	.624	3.0	1.0	.9	.4	8.4

== Personal life ==
Carter is the nephew of rapper Jay Z.
