= 2017–18 Utah Utes men's basketball team =

American college basketball season

2017–18 Utah Utes men's basketball

NIT, Runner-Up
- Conference: Pac-12 Conference
- Record: 23–12 (11–7 Pac–12)
- Head coach: Larry Krystkowiak (7th season)
- Assistant coaches: Tommy Connor; DeMarlo Slocum; Andy Hill
- Home arena: Jon M. Huntsman Center

2017–18 Pac-12 Conference men's basketball standings
	Conf.				Overall
Team	W		L	PCT	W		L	PCT
No. 12 Arizona †	14	–	4	.778	27	–	8	.771
USC	12	–	6	.667	24	–	12	.667
UCLA	11	–	7	.611	21	–	12	.636
Utah	11	–	7	.611	23	–	12	.657
Stanford	11	–	7	.611	19	–	16	.543
Oregon	10	–	8	.556	23	–	13	.639
Washington	10	–	8	.556	21	–	13	.618
Colorado	8	–	10	.444	17	–	15	.531
Arizona State	8	–	10	.444	20	–	12	.625
Oregon State	7	–	11	.389	16	–	16	.500
Washington State	4	–	14	.222	12	–	19	.387
California	2	–	16	.111	8	–	24	.250
† Pac-12 Tournament winner Rankings from AP poll

The 2017–18 Utah Runnin' Utes men's basketball team represented the University of Utah during the 2017–18 NCAA Division I men's basketball season. The team was led by seventh-year head coach Larry Krystkowiak. They played their home games at the Jon M. Huntsman Center in Salt Lake City, Utah as members of the Pac-12 Conference. They finished the season 23–12, 11–7 in Pac-12 play to finish in a three-way tie for third place. They lost in the quarterfinals of the Pac-12 tournament to Oregon. They were invited to the National Invitation Tournament where they defeated UC Davis, LSU, Saint Mary's, and Western Kentucky to advance to the championship game where they lost to Penn State.

== Previous season ==
The Utes finished the season 20–12, 11–7 in Pac-12 play to finish in fourth place. They lost in the quarterfinals of the Pac-12 tournament to California. They received an invitation to the National Invitation Tournament where they lost in the first round to Boise State.

== Off-season ==
=== Departures ===
Name	Pos.	Height	Weight	Year	Hometown	Reason for departure
Lorenzo Bonam	G	6'4"	189	Sr.	Inkster, MI	Graduated
Tim Coleman	G	6'1"	190	Jr.	Cincinnati, OH	Elected to transfer eight games into the season.
Kyle Kuzma	F	6'9"	221	Jr.	Burton, MI	Declared for 2017 NBA draft.
JoJo Zamora	G	6'2"	170	Jr.	Oakland, CA	Transferred to New Mexico State
Devon Daniels	G	6'5"	200	Fr.	Battle Creek, MI	Transferred to NC State

=== Incoming transfers ===
Name	Pos.	Height	Weight	Year	Hometown	Note
Justin Bibbins	G	5'8"	150	Sr.	Carson, CA	Eligible to play immediately as Bibbins graduated from Long Beach State.

=== 2017 recruiting class ===
College recruiting
Name	Hometown	School	Height	Weight	Commit date
Branden Carlsen #40 PF	South Jordan, UT	Bingham High School	6 ft 10 in (2.08 m)	210 lb (95 kg)	Oct 23, 2016
Branden Carlsen #40 PF	Recruit ratings: Scout: Rivals: 247Sports: ESPN: (80)				
Donnie Tillman #40 SF	Detroit, MI	Findlay Prep	6 ft 7 in (2.01 m)	221 lb (100 kg)	Feb 1, 2017
Donnie Tillman #40 SF	Recruit ratings: Scout: Rivals: 247Sports: ESPN: (80)				
Christian PoPoola Jr. #48 SG	Las Vegas, NV	Bishop Gorman High School	6 ft 4 in (1.93 m)	190 lb (86 kg)	Apr 22, 2017
Christian PoPoola Jr. #48 SG	Recruit ratings: Scout: Rivals: 247Sports: ESPN: (78)				
Jaxon Brenchley #58 PG	Hyrum, UT	Mountain Crest High School	6 ft 4 in (1.93 m)	180 lb (82 kg)	Aug 31, 2016
Jaxon Brenchley #58 PG	Recruit ratings: Scout: Rivals: 247Sports: ESPN: (75)				
Devante Doutrive #67 SG	Woodland Hills, CA	Birmingham High School	6 ft 5 in (1.96 m)	190 lb (86 kg)	Sep 14, 2017
Devante Doutrive #67 SG	Recruit ratings: Scout: Rivals: 247Sports: ESPN: (75)				
Overall recruit ranking:
Note: In many cases, Scout, Rivals, 247Sports, On3, and ESPN may conflict in their listings of height and weight.; In these cases, the average was taken. ESPN grades are on a 100-point scale.; Sources: "2017 Utah Basketball Commitment List". Rivals.; "Utah Utes 2017 Player Commits". ESPN.; "2017 Team Ranking". Rivals.

== Roster ==
2017–18 Utah Utes men's basketball team
Players
Coaches

Pos.	#	Name	Height	Weight	Year	Previous school	Hometown
G	0	Sedrick Barefield	6 ft 2 in (1.88 m)	190 lb (86 kg)	Jr	Southern Methodist	Corona, California
G	1	Justin Bibbins	5 ft 8 in (1.73 m)	150 lb (68 kg)	Sr	West Virginia University	Carson, California
G	2	Kolbe Caldwell (W)	6 ft 5 in (1.96 m)	205 lb (93 kg)	So	Shawnee C.C.	Bowling Green, Kentucky
F	3	Donnie Tillman	6 ft 7 in (2.01 m)	225 lb (102 kg)	Fr	Findlay Prep	Detroit, Michigan
G	5	Parker Van Dyke	6 ft 3 in (1.91 m)	185 lb (84 kg)	RS Jr	East HS	Salt Lake City, Utah
G	10	Jake Connor (W)	6 ft 3 in (1.91 m)	181 lb (82 kg)	RS Jr	Highland HS	Salt Lake City, Utah
F	11	Chris Seeley	6 ft 8 in (2.03 m)	215 lb (98 kg)	So	Central HS	Fresno, California
F	13	David Collette	6 ft 10 in (2.08 m)	220 lb (100 kg)	Sr	Utah State	Murray, Utah
G	14	Brooks King (W)	6 ft 3 in (1.91 m)	200 lb (91 kg)	Fr	Centennial HS	Boise, Idaho
G	15	Nate Duda (W)	6 ft 5 in (1.96 m)	190 lb (86 kg)	So	North Platte C.C.	Framingham, Massachusetts
G	20	Beau Rydalch (W)	6 ft 6 in (1.98 m)	205 lb (93 kg)	So	South Summit HS	Oakley, Utah
F	21	Tyler Rawson	6 ft 10 in (2.08 m)	225 lb (102 kg)	Sr	Salt Lake C.C.	American Fork, Utah
G/F	30	Gabe Bealer	6 ft 6 in (1.98 m)	183 lb (83 kg)	RS Sr	CCSF	San Francisco, California
F/C	34	Jayce Johnson	7 ft 0 in (2.13 m)	235 lb (107 kg)	RS So	Santa Monica HS	Mission Viejo, California
F	40	Marc Reininger (W)	6 ft 9 in (2.06 m)	220 lb (100 kg)	So	Regis Jesuit HS	Monument, Colorado
F	43	Jakub Jokl	6 ft 11 in (2.11 m)	230 lb (104 kg)	So	Canarias	Havlíčkův Brod, Czech Republic
G	50	Christian Popoola	6 ft 4 in (1.93 m)	190 lb (86 kg)	Fr	Bishop Gorman HS	Las Vegas, Nevada
G	55	Devante Doutrive (redshirt)	6 ft 5 in (1.96 m)	190 lb (86 kg)	Fr	Birmingham HS	Woodland Hills, California

Head coach

- Larry Krystkowiak (Montana)

Assistant coach(es)

- Tommy Connor (Utah)
- Andy Hill (Eastern Washington)
- DeMarlo Slocum (Georgia Southern)

Legend

- (C) Team captain
- (S) Suspended
- (I) Ineligible
- (W) Walk-on
- Injured
- Current redshirt

Roster

== Schedule and results ==
Date time, TV	Rank^{#}	Opponent^{#}	Result	Record	Site (attendance) city, state
Exhibition
Nov 1, 2017*; 7:00 pm		Montana Tech	W 95–45	–	Jon M. Huntsman Center (9,097); Salt Lake City, UT
Non-conference regular season
Nov 10, 2017*; 8:00 pm, P12N		Prairie View A&M; MGM Resorts Main Event campus-site game	W 83–62	1–0	Jon M. Huntsman Center (9,887); Salt Lake City, UT
Nov 13, 2017*; 8:00 pm, P12N		Mississippi Valley State	W 91–51	2–0	Jon M. Huntsman Center (9,690); Salt Lake City, UT
Nov 16, 2017*; 6:00 pm, P12N		Missouri	W 77–59	3–0	Jon M. Huntsman Center (12,064); Salt Lake City, UT
Nov 20, 2017*; 10:30 pm, ATTSNRM		vs. Ole Miss; MGM Resorts Main Event Heavyweight semifinals	W 83–74	4–0	T-Mobile Arena (8,107); Paradise, NV
Nov 22, 2017*; 10:30 pm, ESPN2		vs. UNLV; MGM Resorts Main Event Heavyweight championship	L 58–85	4–1	T-Mobile Arena (8,424); Paradise, NV
Nov 24, 2017*; 6:00 pm, P12N		Eastern Washington; MGM Resorts Main Event campus-site game	W 85–69	5–1	Jon M. Huntsman Center (13,264); Salt Lake City, UT
Dec 2, 2017*; 5:00 pm, P12N		Hawaii	W 80–60	6–1	Jon M. Huntsman Center (13,896); Salt Lake City, UT
Dec 5, 2017*; 7:00 pm, FS1		at Butler	L 69–81	6–2	Hinkle Fieldhouse (7,638); Indianapolis, IN
Dec 9, 2017*; 5:30 pm, P12N		vs. Utah State; Old Oquirrh Bucket/Beehive Classic	W 77–67	7–2	Vivint Smart Home Arena (7,729); Salt Lake City, UT
Dec 16, 2017*; 9:00 pm, ESPN2		at BYU; Rivalry/Old Oquirrh Bucket	L 65–77	7–3	Marriott Center (16,272); Provo, UT
Dec 20, 2017*; 7:00 pm, P12N		Northwestern State	W 84–62	8–3	Jon M. Huntsman Center (13,125); Salt Lake City, UT
Pac-12 regular season
Dec 29, 2017; 8:00 pm, FS1		at Oregon	W 66–56	9–3 (1–0)	Matthew Knight Arena (9,661); Eugene, OR
Dec 31, 2017; 4:00 pm, P12N		at Oregon State	W 66–64	10–3 (2–0)	Gill Coliseum (4,751); Corvallis, OR
Jan 4, 2018; 7:00 pm, ESPN		No. 14 Arizona	L 82–94	10–4 (2–1)	Jon M. Huntman Center (13,543); Salt Lake City, UT
Jan 7, 2018; 6:00 pm, ESPNU		No. 4 Arizona State	L 77–80	10–5 (2–2)	Jon M. Huntsman Center (12,123); Salt Lake City, UT
Jan 11, 2018; 9:00 pm, ESPN2		at UCLA	L 64–83	10–6 (2–3)	Pauley Pavilion (8,739); Los Angeles, CA
Jan 14, 2018; 6:00 pm, ESPNU		at USC	L 67–84	10–7 (2–4)	Galen Center (4,822); Los Angeles, CA
Jan 18, 2018; 8:00 pm, P12N		Washington	W 70–62	11–7 (3–4)	Jon M. Huntsman Center (12,378); Salt Lake City, UT
Jan 21, 2018; 6:00 pm, ESPNU		Washington State	W 82–69	12–7 (4–4)	Jon M. Huntsman Center (11,241); Salt Lake City, UT
Jan 25, 2018; 7:30 pm, ESPNU		at No. 21 Arizona State	W 80–77 ^{OT}	13–7 (5–4)	Wells Fargo Arena (11,536); Tempe, AZ
Jan 27, 2018; 3:30 pm, FOX		at No. 11 Arizona	L 73–74	13–8 (5–5)	McKale Center (14,644); Tucson, AZ
Feb 2, 2018; 7:00 pm, FS1		at Colorado	L 55–67	13–9 (5–6)	Coors Events Center (7,645); Boulder, CO
Feb 8, 2018; 6:00 pm, FS1		Stanford	W 75–60	14–9 (6–6)	Jon M. Huntsman Center (14,038); Salt Lake City, UT
Feb 10, 2018; 7:30 pm, P12N		California	W 77–43	15–9 (7–6)	Jon M. Huntsman Center (14,358); Salt Lake City, UT
Feb 15, 2018; 7:00 pm, P12N		at Washington	W 70–58	16–9 (8–6)	Alaska Airlines Arena (8,170); Seattle, WA
Feb 17, 2018; 8:00 pm, ESPN2		at Washington State	W 77–70	17–9 (9–6)	Beasley Coliseum (2,924); Pullman, WA
Feb 22, 2018; 7:00 pm, ESPN		UCLA	W 84–78	18–9 (10–6)	Jon M. Huntsman Center (13,141); Salt Lake City, UT
Feb 24, 2018; 12:30 pm, P12N		USC	L 58–74	18–10 (10–7)	Jon M. Huntsman Center (13,598); Salt Lake City, UT
Mar 3, 2018; 5:00 pm, P12N		Colorado	W 64–54	19–10 (11–7)	Jon M. Huntsman Center (13,751); Salt Lake City, UT
Pac-12 Tournament
Mar 8, 2018; 9:30 pm, FS1	(3)	vs. (6) Oregon; Quarterfinals	L 66–68	19–11	T-Mobile Arena (13,194); Paradise, NV
NIT
Mar 14, 2018*; 7:00 pm, ESPN3	(2)	(7) UC Davis; First Round – Saint Mary's Bracket	W 69–59	20–11	Jon M. Huntsman Center (3,452); Salt Lake City, UT
Mar 19, 2018*; 7:00 pm, ESPNU	(2)	(3) LSU; Second Round – Saint Mary's Bracket	W 95–71	21–11	Jon M. Huntsman Center (5,528); Salt Lake City, UT
Mar 21, 2018*; 8:00 pm, ESPN	(2)	at (1) No. 25 Saint Mary's; Quarterfinals – Saint Mary's Bracket	W 67–58 ^{OT}	22–11	McKeon Pavilion (2,309); Moraga, CA
Mar 27, 2018*; 5:00 pm, ESPN	(2)	vs. (4) Western Kentucky; Semifinals	W 69–64	23–11	Madison Square Garden (7,865); New York City, NY
Mar 29, 2018*; 5:00 pm, ESPN	(2)	vs. (4) Penn State; Championship	L 66–82	23–12	Madison Square Garden (11,175); New York City, NY
*Non-conference game. ^{#}Rankings from AP Poll. (#) Tournament seedings in parentheses. All times are in Mountain Time.
