= Allonzo Trier =

American basketball player (born 1996)

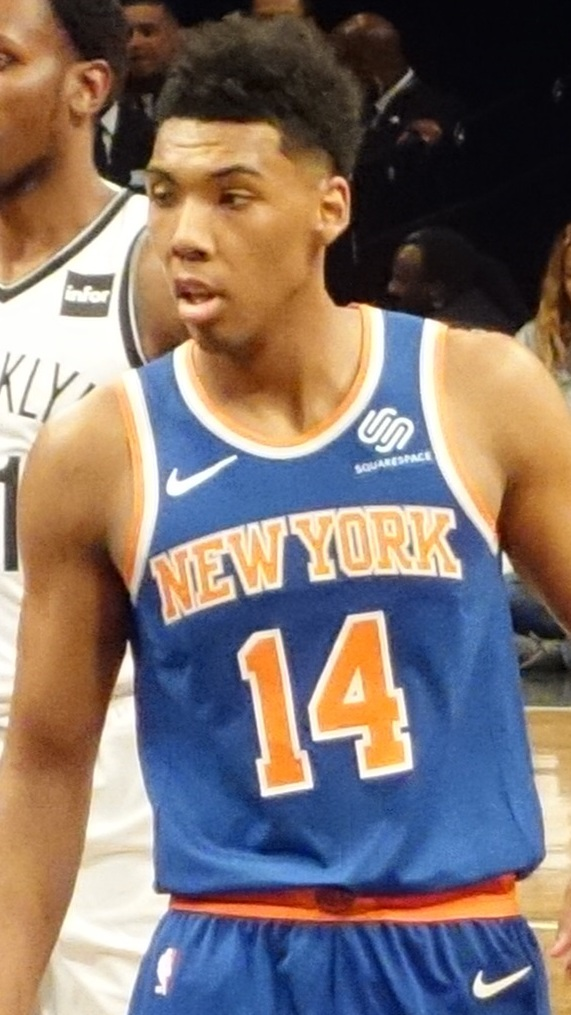
- Trier with the New York Knicks in 2018

Personal information
- Born: January 17, 1996 (age 30) Seattle, Washington, U.S.
- Listed height: 6 ft 4 in (1.93 m)
- Listed weight: 200 lb (91 kg)

Career information
- High school: Montrose Christian (Rockville, Maryland); Findlay Prep (Henderson, Nevada)
- College: Arizona (2015–2018)
- NBA draft: 2018: undrafted
- Playing career: 2018–2021
- Position: Shooting guard
- Number: 14

Career history
- 2018–2020: New York Knicks
- 2018–2020: →Westchester Knicks
- 2021: Iowa Wolves
- 2024: Rio Grande Valley Vipers

Career highlights
- First-team All-Pac-12 (2018); Second-team All-Pac-12 (2017); Pac-12 tournament MOP (2017); McDonald's All-American (2015)
- Stats at NBA.com
- Stats at Basketball Reference
Medals
Men's basketball
Representing the United States
FIBA U19 World Championship
Gold medal – first place	2015 Greece	National team
FIBA Americas U18 Championship
Gold medal – first place	2014 United States	National team

Allonzo Brian Trier (born January 17, 1996) is an American former professional basketball player. He played college basketball for the Arizona Wildcats. As a sophomore in 2016–17, he earned second-team all-conference honors in the Pac-12 and was named the most outstanding player in the Pac-12 tournament.

== High school career ==
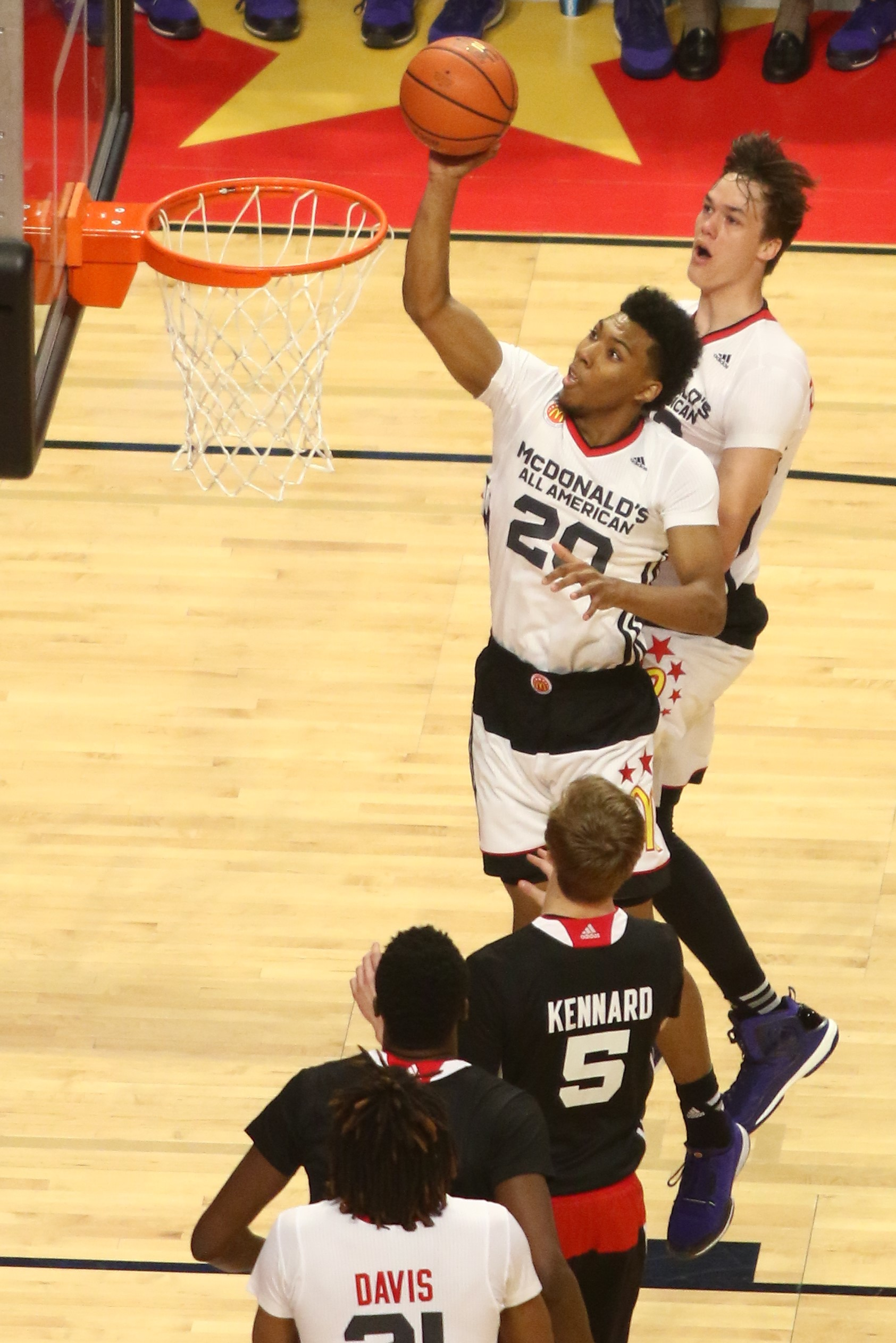
Trier at the 2015 McDonald's All-American Boys Game

Trier attended Montrose Christian School in his junior year, transferring from the Oklahoma City Storm and Tulsa NOAH (Northeast Oklahoma Association of Homeschools). He averaged 25.5 points, 4.0 rebounds, 2.8 assists. and 2.1 steals per game to lead Montrose to a 20–5 record and a National Christian Schools Athletic Association Division I title. He was named the 2014 Gatorade State Player of the Year and was a first-team Washington Post All-Met, elevating his recruiting stock. As a senior, Trier transferred to Findlay Prep in Henderson, Nevada. He averaged 26.6 points and 5.4 rebounds per game at Findlay. He was named to the 2015 USA Today All-USA second team. Playing for the West team in the 2015 McDonald's All-American Boys Game, Trier led his team in scoring with 17 points. In the Jordan Brand Classic, Trier scored 28 points and was named co-MVP.

Trier committed to play at Arizona during an official visit due to his good relationship with coach Sean Miller.

College recruiting
Name	Hometown	School	Height	Weight	Commit date
Allonzo Trier; SG	Seattle, WA	Findlay Prep	6 ft 4 in (1.93 m)	190 lb (86 kg)	Aug 3, 2014
Allonzo Trier; SG	Recruit ratings: Scout: Rivals: 247Sports: ESPN:				
Overall recruit ranking:
Note: In many cases, Scout, Rivals, 247Sports, On3, and ESPN may conflict in their listings of height and weight.; In these cases, the average was taken. ESPN grades are on a 100-point scale.; Sources:

== College career ==
=== Freshman season ===
In an 85–72 victory over Fresno State on December 10, 2015, Trier scored a season-high 27 points on 8-of-11 shooting. He averaged 14.8 points per game in his freshman season but missed seven games due to a hand injury. On April 4, 2016, he announced he would be returning for his sophomore season.

=== Sophomore season ===
Trier was suspended indefinitely for testing positive for PEDs; Trier was involved in a car crash and was given a drug. After the NCAA went over the medical documents, Trier was allowed to return.

On January 20, 2017, it was announced Trier would make his return for the UCLA game after 19 game absence.

As a sophomore in 2016–17, he earned second-team all-conference honors in the Pac-12 and was named the most outstanding player in the Pac-12 tournament.

=== Junior season ===
On February 22, 2018, he was ruled ineligible by the NCAA after testing positive for a banned substance. According to Arizona, it was a remnant of the same substance he was banned for a year earlier.

Following Arizona's loss in the 2018 NCAA men's basketball tournament, Trier announced his intention to forgo his last season of collegiate eligibility and declare for the 2018 NBA draft.

== Professional career ==
=== New York Knicks (2018–2020) ===
After going undrafted in the 2018 NBA draft, on July 3, 2018, Trier signed with the New York Knicks of the National Basketball Association (NBA), on a two-way contract with the Knicks' NBA G League affiliate, the Westchester Knicks. Under the terms of that deal, Trier would split time between New York and Westchester. In his NBA debut on October 17, Trier recorded 15 points on 5-of-9 shooting, four rebounds, and two blocks in a 126–107 win over the Atlanta Hawks. On November 23, Trier scored a career high 25 points in a 114–109 win over the New Orleans Pelicans. On November 27, he recorded his first career double-double with 24 points and 10 rebounds as the Knicks lost to the Detroit Pistons. On December 13, Trier signed a standard NBA contract with the Knicks, becoming the first two-way player to sign a guaranteed NBA contract within the first two months of the season. On January 23, 2019, Trier recorded his second career double-double, scoring a new career-high 31 points, shooting 12-for-18 from the field, and grabbing 10 rebounds in a 114–110 loss to the Houston Rockets. Trier made 64 appearances (including three starts) for New York during his rookie campaign, averaging 10.9 points, 3.1 rebounds, and 1.9 assists.

On July 14, 2019, the Knicks picked up the option on Trier's contract. On June 26, 2020, Trier was waived by the Knicks.

=== Iowa Wolves (2021) ===
On January 11, 2021, the Iowa Wolves of the NBA G League selected Trier with the fourth overall pick in the January 2021 NBA G League draft and he was later included in the team's roster.

=== Rio Grande Valley Vipers (2024) ===
On October 27, 2024, Trier signed with the Rio Grande Valley Vipers of the NBA G League, but was waived on November 7.

== National team career ==
He played in the FIBA Americas U18 Championship in 2014, winning a gold medal for the United States. He scored 9 points in the championship game. In five games he averaged 12.6 points and 1.0 rebounds per game. Trier competed in the FIBA U19 World Championship in 2015, winning a gold medal for the United States. Trier posted averages of 8.7 points and 1.5 rebounds per game.

== Personal life ==
Trier was born in Seattle, Washington, to Marcie Trier and a father whom he never met. When he was in sixth grade, he was diagnosed with dyslexia. He was kicked off a varsity team in eighth grade for being too good. In 2009, Trier was the subject of The New York Times Magazine profile of his ability at a young age and the frequent travelling for AAU events it entailed.

== Career statistics ==
Legend
GP	Games played	GS	Games started	MPG	Minutes per game
FG%	Field goal percentage	3P%	3-point field goal percentage	FT%	Free throw percentage
RPG	Rebounds per game	APG	Assists per game	SPG	Steals per game
BPG	Blocks per game	PPG	Points per game	**Bold**	Career high

=== NBA ===
==== Regular season ====
Year	Team	GP	GS	MPG	FG%	3P%	FT%	RPG	APG	SPG	BPG	PPG
2018–19	New York	**64**	**3**	**22.8**	.448	**.394**	**.803**	**3.1**	**1.9**	**.4**	**.2**	**10.9**
2019–20	New York	24	1	12.1	**.481**	.358	.791	1.2	1.2	.1	**.2**	6.5
Career		88	4	19.9	.454	.384	.801	2.6	1.7	.4	.2	9.7

=== College ===
Year	Team	GP	GS	MPG	FG%	3P%	FT%	RPG	APG	SPG	BPG	PPG
2015–16	Arizona	27	21	28.0	.466	.364	.793	3.3	1.1	.5	.2	14.8
2016–17	Arizona	18	13	31.9	.460	**.391**	.810	**5.3**	2.7	.4	.1	17.2
2017–18	Arizona	**33**	**33**	**34.1**	**.500**	.380	**.865**	3.0	**3.2**	**.6**	**.3**	**18.1**
Career		78	67	31.5	.479	.378	.827	3.7	2.4	.5	.2	16.8
