= Tra Holder =

American basketball player (born 1995)

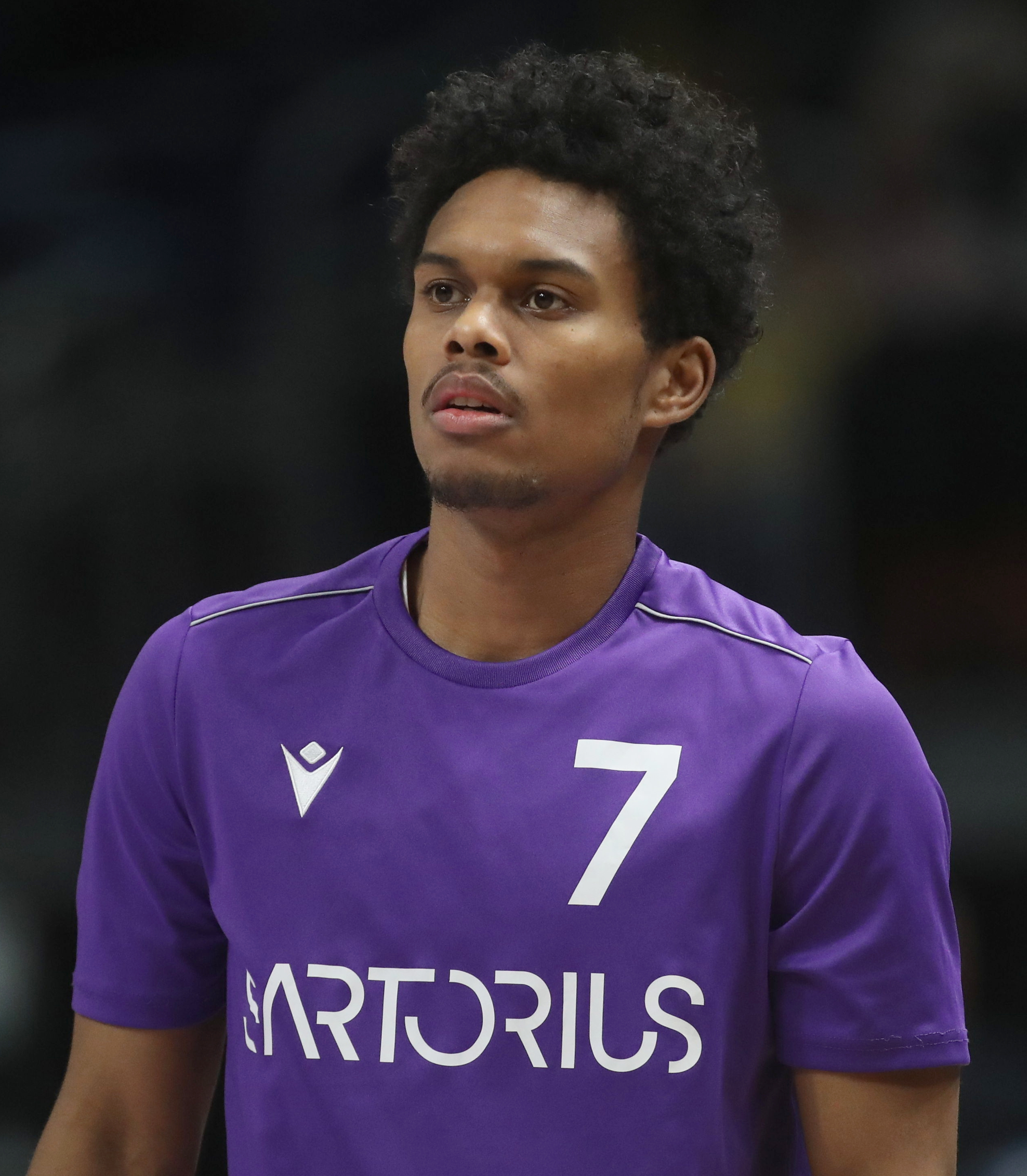
- Tra Holder in 2025

No. 2 – Obradoiro CAB
- Position: Point guard
- League: Primera FEB

Personal information
- Born: September 27, 1995 (age 31) Los Angeles, California, U.S.
- Listed height: 6 ft 1 in (1.85 m)
- Listed weight: 173 lb (78 kg)

Career information
- High school: Brentwood School (Los Angeles, California)
- College: Arizona State (2014–2018)
- NBA draft: 2018: undrafted
- Playing career: 2018–present

Career history
- 2018: Auxilium Torino
- 2019–2020: Skyliners Frankfurt
- 2020–2021: MKS Dąbrowa Górnicza
- 2021: Nürnberg Falcons
- 2021–2022: Birmingham Squadron
- 2022: Westchester Knicks
- 2023: Mexico City Capitanes
- 2023–2024: Jämtland Basket
- 2024–2025: BG Göttingen
- 2025–2026: Jiaozuo Cultural Tourism
- 2026–present: Obradoiro

Career highlights
- First-team All-Pac-12 (2018)
Medals
Men's 3x3 basketball
Representing Thailand
Southeast Asian Games
Gold medal – first place	2021 Vietnam	Team
Bronze medal – third place	2023 Cambodia	Team
Men's basketball
Representing Thailand
Southeast Asian Games
Bronze medal – third place	2021 Vietnam	Team
Bronze medal – third place	2023 Cambodia	Team

Antonio Price "Tra" Holder or Antonio Price Soonthornchote (born September 27, 1995) is an American-Thai professional basketball player for Obradoiro of the Spanish Primera FEB. He played college basketball for the Arizona State Sun Devils.

== Early life ==
Holder was born to Charee Rogers and Tony Holder. His mother is Thai. Holder grew up in Los Angeles, and attended high school at Brentwood School.

== College career ==
Holder committed to Arizona State, and former coach Herb Sendek after an unofficial visit to campus in May 2013. In his first season, he was honored as a member of the Pac-12 All-Freshman Team. As a sophomore, he developed into one of the best guards in the conference under Bobby Hurley. As a junior, Holder averaged 16.2 points, 3.7 rebounds and 3.2 assists per game.

Holder was named Pac-12 Player of the Week on November 20, 2017, after averaging 23.7 points, 6.3 rebounds, 5.7 assists and 2.0 steals in three victories. Holder scored 40 points to lead the Sun Devils to a 102–86 win over No. 15 Xavier. He was again awarded player of the week honors on November 27. Holder had 29 points on 8-for-16 shooting in a 95–85 victory over second-ranked Kansas on December 9. He would lead the Sun Devils to their first ever 10–0 start in college basketball history after a 76–64 win over the Vanderbilt Commodores. Ranked #3 in the AP poll and as the last undefeated team in the nation (12–0), on December 30, the Sun Devils played on the road at their historic rival, the Arizona Wildcats in McKale Arena. Tra Holder was the leading scorer of the game with 31 points, but the Sun Devils fell to the Wildcats 78–84 to begin the Pac-12 Conference schedule.

== Professional career ==
=== Auxilium Torino (2018) ===
After going undrafted in the 2018 NBA draft, on July 14, 2018, Holder signed a deal with the Italian club Auxilium Torino for the 2018–19 LBA season.

=== MKS Dąbrowa Górnicza (2020–2021) ===
On January 15, 2020, Holder signed with MKS Dąbrowa Górnicza of the Polish Basketball League (PLK).

=== Nürnberg Falcons (2021) ===
In January 2021, Holder signed with Nürnberg Falcons BC of the German ProA.

=== Birmingham Squadron (2021–2022) ===
On October 25, Holder signed with the Birmingham Squadron after being acquired from the available player pool. He was then later waived on January 31, 2022. On February 16, 2022, Holder was reacquired and activated by the Birmingham Squadron. On March 2, 2022, Holder was waived by the Birmingham Squadron.

=== Westchester Knicks (2022) ===
On March 5, 2022, Holder was acquired via available player pool by the Westchester Knicks. On December 14, 2022, Holder was waived.

=== Mexico City Capitanes (2023) ===
On February 13, 2023, Holder was acquired by the Mexico City Capitanes. On February 28, 2023, Holder was waived.

=== BG Göttingen (2024–2025) ===
On October 10, 2024, he signed with BG Göttingen of the Basketball Bundesliga (BBL).

=== Obradoiro (2026–present) ===
On April 2, 2026, he signed for Obradoiro of the Spanish Primera FEB.

== National team career ==
Holder has played for the Thai national team.
