= David Crisp =

American basketball player

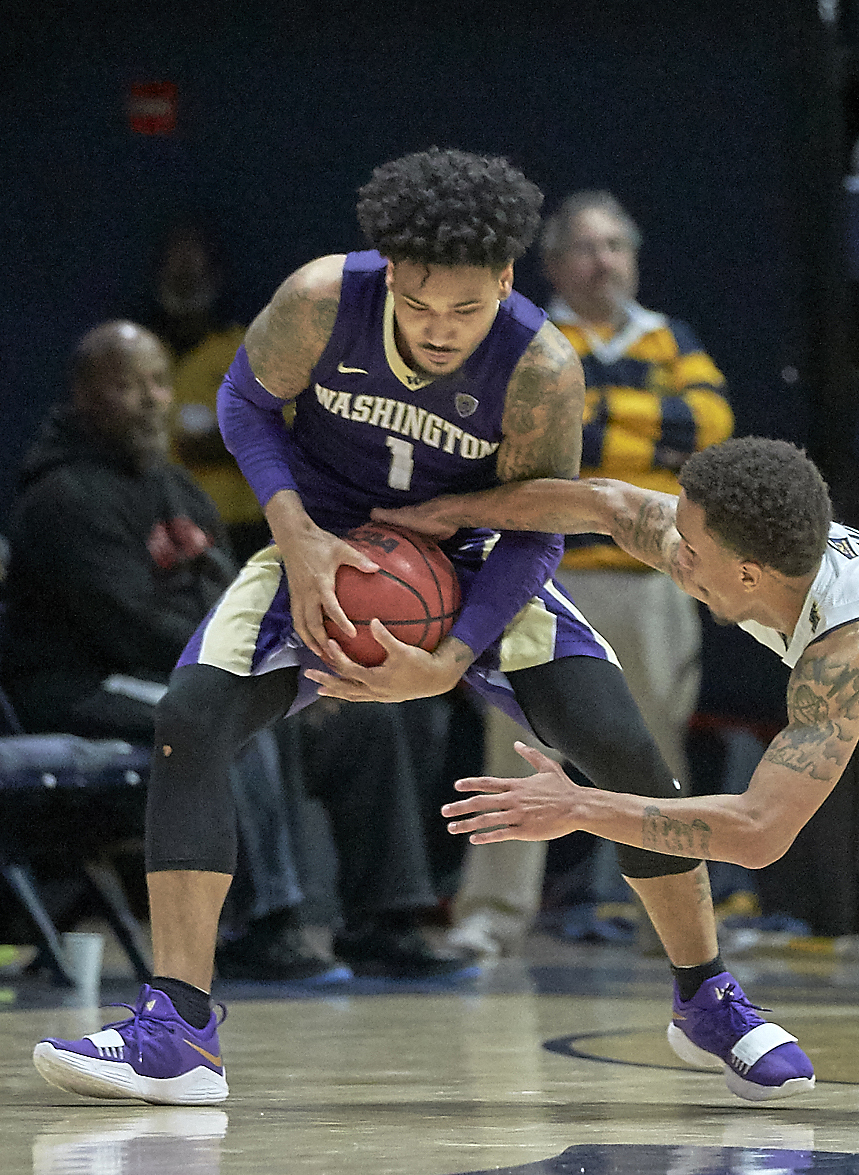

Randers Cimbria
- Position: Point guard
- League: Basketligaen

Personal information
- Born: September 27, 1996 (age 30) Lakewood, Washington
- Listed height: 6 ft 0 in (1.83 m)
- Listed weight: 191 lb (87 kg)

Career information
- High school: Clover Park (Lakewood, Washington); Rainier Beach (Seattle, Washington); Brewster Academy (Wolfeboro, New Hampshire)
- College: Washington (2015–2019)
- NBA draft: 2019: undrafted
- Playing career: 2020–present

Career history
- 2020–present: Randers Cimbria

David Crisp Jr. (born September 27, 1996) is an American professional basketball player for Randers Cimbria of the Basketligaen. He played college basketball for the Washington Huskies of the Pac-12 Conference. Crisp was selected by the Stockton Kings in the second round of the 2019 G-League draft.

== Early life ==
Crisp was born in Ft Knox, Kentucky. His father, David Crisp Sr., played college football for the Marshall Thundering Herd. Crisp played both basketball and football until 8th grade before ultimately choosing basketball. During the 2010–11 season, he led Clover Park High School to a Washington Class 2A state championship. Crisp then transferred to Rainier Beach High School where he won a state championship alongside San Antonio Spurs guard Dejounte Murray. In 2015, Crisp won a National Prep Championship with Brewster Academy.

== College career ==
Crisp declined offers from Creighton, Nebraska, Princeton and Texas A&M before signing with Washington. As a freshman, Crisp played in all 34 games averaging 7.2 points, 2.4 rebounds and 1.6 assists per game. As a sophomore, Crisp averaged 13.8 points, 3.4 rebounds, and 3.1 assists per game. During his junior season, Crisp became the 40th player in Huskies history to reach 1,000 points scored. He posted 11.6 points and 3.1 assists per game during his junior season. Crisp's senior season saw the Washington Huskies reach the second round of the NCAA tournament with Crisp scoring 8 points during their first round win against Utah State. Crisp averaged 12.2 points, 2.7 assists, 2.1 rebounds, and 1.0 steal per game as senior.

== Professional career ==
On June 13, 2019, Crisp was one of twenty-four prospects to work out for the Portland Trail Blazers, although he was not selected by them. Crisp was drafted with the 51st overall pick in the 2019 G-League Draft by the Stockton Kings. On November 6, 2019, Crisp was released by the Stockton Kings. On September 11, 2020, Crisp signed with Randers Cimbria of the Basketligaen.
