= List of Drake Bulldogs men's basketball seasons =

This is a list of seasons completed by the Drake Bulldogs men's basketball team of the National Collegiate Athletic Association (NCAA) Division I. Drake fielded their first team in 1906–07 with C. A. Pell coaching, and are currently coached by Eric Henderson.

== Seasons ==
Record table
Season	Coach	Overall	Conference	Standing	Postseason
C. A. Pell (Independent) (1906–1907)
1906–07	C. A. Pell	2–1			
C. A. Pell (Missouri Valley Conference) (1907–1909)
1907–08	C. A. Pell	1–4	0–1	3rd (North)	
1908–09	C. A. Pell	3–8	3–5	3rd (North)	
John L. Griffith (Missouri Valley Conference) (1909–1910)
1909–10	John L. Griffith	0–12	0–8	3rd (North)	
A. R. Hackett (Missouri Valley Conference) (1910–1912)
1910–11	A. R. Hackett	0–6	0–2	5th	
1911–12	A. R. Hackett	2–7	0–6	3rd (North)	
John L. Griffith (Missouri Valley Conference) (1912–1914)
1912–13	John L. Griffith	1–8	0–6	3rd (North)	
1913–14	John L. Griffith	1–9	0–5	3rd (North)	
Ray Whisman (Missouri Valley Conference) (1914–1916)
1914–15	Ray Whisman	5–6	1–5	6th	
1915–16	Ray Whisman	3–9	1–5	6th	
Ralph Glaze (Missouri Valley Conference) (1916–1917)
1916–17	Ralph Glaze	5–7	0–4	7th	
S. W. Hobbs (Missouri Valley Conference) (1917–1918)
1917–18	S. W. Hobbs	10–18	2–9	7th	
M. B. Banks (Missouri Valley Conference) (1918–1921)
1918–19	M. B. Banks	2–17	0–10	8th	
1919–20	M. B. Banks	12–11	3–7	6th	
1920–21	M. B. Banks	10–8	5–8	5th?	
Ossie Solem (Missouri Valley Conference) (1921–1925)
1921–22	Ossie Solem	14–4	12–4	3rd	
1922–23	Ossie Solem	10–6	10–6	3rd	
1923–24	Ossie Solem	9–9	8–8	T–4th	
1924–25	Ossie Solem	4–13	4–12	T–7th	
Bill Boelter (Missouri Valley Conference) (1925–1932)
1925–26	Bill Boelter	9–9	7–9	T–6th	
1926–27	Bill Boelter	8–10	7–7	4th	
1927–28	Bill Boelter	7–13	7–11	T–7th	
1928–29	Bill Boelter	6–13	3–4	3rd	
1929–30	Bill Boelter	10–9	4–4	3rd	
1930–31	Bill Boelter	4–15	2–6	5th	
1931–32	Bill Boelter	2–17	2–6	5th	
Evan O. Williams (Missouri Valley Conference) (1932–1943)
1932–33	Evan O. Williams	4–12	2–8	6th	
1933–34	Evan O. Williams	6–12	4–6	T–4th	
1934–35	Evan O. Williams	14–11	8–4	T–1st	
1935–36	Evan O. Williams	16–12	8–4	T–1st	
1936–37	Evan O. Williams	13–10	7–5	T–3rd	
1937–38	Evan O. Williams	14–6	10–4	2nd	
1938–39	Evan O. Williams	14–7	11–3	T-1st	
1939–40	Evan O. Williams	13–12	7–5	3rd	
1940–41	Evan O. Williams	9–11	6–6	T–4th	
1941–42	Evan O. Williams	2–13	1–9	6th	
1942–43	Evan O. Williams	8–9	3–7	T–4th	
Bill Easton (Missouri Valley Conference) (1943–1944)
1943–44	Bill Easton	7–13			
Vee Green (Missouri Valley Conference) (1944–1946)
1944–45	Vee Green	11–13			
1945–46	Vee Green	10–16	5–7	4th	
Forddy Anderson (Missouri Valley Conference) (1946–1948)
1946–47	Forddy Anderson	18–11	8–4	T–2nd	
1947–48	Forddy Anderson	14–12	5–5	3rd	
Jack McClelland (Missouri Valley Conference) (1948–1951)
1948–49	Jack McClelland	13–13	4–6	4th	
1949–50	Jack McClelland	14–12	5–7	5th	
1950–51	Jack McClelland	11–14	4–10	T–6th	
Jack McClelland (Independent) (1951–1956)
1951–52	Jack McClelland	13–12			
1952–53	Jack McClelland	13–12			
1953–54	Jack McClelland	7–16			
1954–55	Jack McClelland	9–12			
1955–56	Jack McClelland	10–14			
John E. Benington (Missouri Valley Conference) (1956–1958)
1956–57	John E. Benington	8–16	4–10	8th	
1957–58	John E. Benington	13–12	7–7	4th	
Maury John (Missouri Valley Conference) (1958–1971)
1958–59	Maury John	9–15	4–10	6th	
1959–60	Maury John	11–14	4–10	7th	
1960–61	Maury John	19–7	7–5	T–3rd	
1961–62	Maury John	16–8	6–6	4th	
1962–63	Maury John	11–14	3–9	7th	
1963–64	Maury John	21–7	10–2	T–1st	NIT second round
1964–65	Maury John	13–12	6–8	6th	
1965–66	Maury John	15–10	6–8	T–6th	
1966–67	Maury John	9–16	4–10	T–7th	
1967–68	Maury John	18–8	9–7	T–4th	
1968–69	Maury John	26–5	13–3	T-1st	NCAA University Division Third Place
1969–70	Maury John	22–7	14–2	1st	NCAA University Division Elite Eight
1970–71	Maury John	21–8	9–5	T–1st	NCAA University Division Elite Eight
Howard Stacey (Missouri Valley Conference) (1971–1974)
1971–72	Howard Stacey	7–19	2–12	T–7th	
1972–73	Howard Stacey	14–12	5–9	7th	
1973–74	Howard Stacey	13–13	3–9	9th	
Bob Ortegel (Missouri Valley Conference) (1974–1981)
1974–75	Bob Ortegel	19–10	9–5	3rd	NCIT Champion
1975–76	Bob Ortegel	8–19	3–9	7th	
1976–77	Bob Ortegel	10–17	5–7	5th	
1977–78	Bob Ortegel	6–22	2–14	9th	
1978–79	Bob Ortegel	15–12	8–8	T–3rd	
1979–80	Bob Ortegel	15–12	6–10	7th	
1980–81	Bob Ortegel	18–11	10–6	T–4th	NIT first round
Gary Garner (Missouri Valley Conference) (1981–1988)
1981–82	Gary Garner	12–15	7–9	T–6th	
1982–83	Gary Garner	13–15	9–9	6th	
1983–84	Gary Garner	8–20	4–12	8th	
1984–85	Gary Garner	12–15	4–12	T–8th	
1985–86	Gary Garner	19–11	10–6	T–2nd	NIT first round
1986–87	Gary Garner	17–14	6–8	5th	
1987–88	Gary Garner	14–14	5–9	6th	
Tom Abatemarco (Missouri Valley Conference) (1988–1990)
1988–89	Tom Abatemarco	12–17	6–8	T–5th	
1989–90	Tom Abatemarco; Eddie Fields	13–18	5–9	7th	
Rudy Washington (Missouri Valley Conference) (1990–1996)
1990–91	Rudy Washington	8–21	4–12	T–8th	
1991–92	Rudy Washington	6–21	3–15	T–9th	
1992–93	Rudy Washington	14–14	9–9	5th	
1993–94	Rudy Washington	11–16	6–12	T–7th	
1994–95	Rudy Washington	12–15	9–9	T–6th	
1995–96	Rudy Washington	12–15	8–10	T–7th	
Kurt Kanaskie (Missouri Valley Conference) (1996–2003)
1996–97	Kurt Kanaskie	2–26	0–18	10th	
1997–98	Kurt Kanaskie	3–24	0–18	10th	
1998–99	Kurt Kanaskie	10–17	5–13	10th	
1999–00	Kurt Kanaskie	11–18	4–14	10th	
2000–01	Kurt Kanaskie	12–16	8–10	T–7th	
2001–02	Kurt Kanaskie	14–15	9–9	T–5th	
2002–03	Kurt Kanaskie	10–20	5–13	T–8th	
Tom Davis (Missouri Valley Conference) (2003–2007)
2003–04	Tom Davis	12–16	7–11	T–6th	
2004–05	Tom Davis	13–16	7–11	7th	
2005–06	Tom Davis	12–19	5–13	T–7th	
2006–07	Tom Davis	17–15	6–12	T–7th	
Keno Davis (Missouri Valley Conference) (2007–2008)
2007–08	Keno Davis	28–5	15–3	1st	NCAA Division I first round
Mark Phelps (Missouri Valley Conference) (2008–2013)
2008–09	Mark Phelps	17–16	7–11	T–8th	CIT first round
2009–10	Mark Phelps	14–19	7–11	8th	
2010–11	Mark Phelps	13–18	7–11	7th	
2011–12	Mark Phelps	18–16	9–9	T–3rd	CIT second round
2012–13	Mark Phelps	15–17	7–11	T–7th	
Ray Giacoletti (Missouri Valley Conference) (2013–2017)
2013–14	Ray Giacoletti	15–16	6–12	T–8th	
2014–15	Ray Giacoletti	9–22	6–12	7th	
2015–16	Ray Giacoletti	7–24	2–16	10th	
2016–17	Ray Giacoletti; Jeff Rutter	7–24	5–13	T–9th	
Niko Medved (Missouri Valley Conference) (2017–2018)
2017–18	Niko Medved	17–17	10–8	T–3rd	CIT second round
Darian DeVries (Missouri Valley Conference) (2018–2024)
2018–19	Darian DeVries	24–10	12–6	T–1st	CIT first round
2019–20	Darian DeVries	20–14	8–10	8th	No postseason held
2020–21	Darian DeVries	26–5	15–3	T–2nd	NCAA Division I first round
2021–22	Darian DeVries	25–11	13–5	2nd	CBI quarterfinals
2022–23	Darian DeVries	27–8	15–5	2nd	NCAA Division I first round
2023–24	Darian DeVries	28–7	16–4	2nd	NCAA Division I first round
Ben McCollum (Missouri Valley Conference) (2024–2025)
2024–25	Ben McCollum	31–4	17–3	1st	NCAA Division I Round of 32
Eric Henderson (Missouri Valley Conference) (2025–present)
2025–26	Eric Henderson	14–20	6–14	9th	
Total:		1,414–1,549	669–889		
National champion Postseason invitational champion Conference regular season champion Conference regular season and conference tournament champion Division regular season champion Division regular season and conference tournament champion Conference tournament champion
