= 2016–17 Arizona Wildcats men's basketball team =

American college basketball season

2016–17 Arizona Wildcats men's basketball

Pac-12 tournament champions Pac-12 regular season co-champions

NCAA tournament, Sweet Sixteen
- Conference: Pac-12 Conference

Ranking
- Coaches: No. 7
- AP: No. 4
- Record: 0–5, 32 wins vacated (0–2 Pac-12, 16 wins vacated)
- Head coach: Sean Miller (8th season)
- Associate head coach: Joe Pasternack
- Assistant coaches: Emanuel Richardson; Mark Phelps
- Home arena: McKale Center

2016–17 Pac-12 Conference men's basketball standings
	Conf.				Overall
Team	W		L	PCT	W		L	PCT
No. 9 Oregon	16	–	2	.889	33	–	6	.846
No. 4 Arizona †	16	–	2	.889	32	–	5	.865
No. 8 UCLA	15	–	3	.833	31	–	5	.861
Utah	11	–	7	.611	20	–	12	.625
California	10	–	8	.556	21	–	13	.618
USC	10	–	8	.556	26	–	10	.722
Colorado	8	–	10	.444	19	–	15	.559
Arizona State	7	–	11	.389	15	–	18	.455
Stanford	6	–	12	.333	14	–	17	.452
Washington State	6	–	12	.333	13	–	18	.419
Washington	2	–	16	.111	9	–	22	.290
Oregon State	1	–	17	.056	5	–	27	.156
† Pac-12 Tournament winner Rankings from AP poll

The 2016–17 Arizona Wildcats men's basketball team represented the University of Arizona during the 2016–17 NCAA Division I men's basketball season. The team was led by eighth-year head coach Sean Miller, and played their home games at McKale Center in Tucson, Arizona as members in the Pac-12 Conference. Coming into the 2016–17 season Arizona has been ranked in 78-consecutive AP polls & 81-straight coaches polls. The 97-consecutive weeks in the AP poll is currently the second-longest streak in the nation behind Kansas at 161 weeks. They have been ranked every week in the 2016-2017 season, bringing those totals to 97 weeks for the AP & 100 weeks for the coaches poll. Arizona won its first 10 conference games, the best start since the '97-'98 season when they started 16–0. They finished the season with a record of 31–4, tied at 16–2 with Oregon in Pac-12 play for first place to win their 3rd Pac-12 regular season championship title for the 15th time. The Wildcats entered the Pac-12 Tournament as a 2-seed, the Wildcats defeated 7-seed Colorado in the quarterfinals, 3-seed UCLA in the semifinals and 1-seed Oregon (avenged from 85–58 loss on February 4 in Eugene, OR) in the championship game, Wildcats won their 2nd Pac-12 Tournament championship title for the 6th time since 2002. Arizona received as an automatic bid to the 5th straight NCAA tournament (34th NCAA tournament appearances) as a 2-seed in the West regional, The Arizona Wildcats defeated the 15-seed North Dakota 100–82 in the first round, 7-seed Saint Mary's 69–60 in the second round before being upset by 11-seed Xavier 73–71 in the Sweet Sixteen.

Due to 2017–18 NCAA Division I men's basketball corruption scandal, all wins from this season have been vacated.

== Previous season ==
The Wildcats finished the 2015–16 season with a record of 25–9, 12–6 in Pac-12 play to finish in a tie with California for third place. The Wildcats entered the Pac-12 tournament as a 4 seed where they beat Colorado in the quarterfinals, but fell in the semifinals to Oregon in overtime. Arizona received an at-large bid to the NCAA tournament, the program's 33rd overall appearance, as a No. 6 seed in the South Region. They lost in the First Round to Wichita State.

== Off-season ==
Name	Pos.	Height	Weight	Year	Hometown	Notes
Ryan Anderson	PF	6’9”	235	RS Senior	Lakewood, CA	Graduated.
Mark Tollefsen	SF	6’9”	205	RS Senior	Danville, CA	Graduated.
Kaleb Tarczewski	C	7'0"	250	Senior	Claremont, NH	Graduated.
Gabe York	SG	6'3"	190	Senior	West Covina, CA	Graduated.
Jacob Hazzard	PG	6'0"	170	Senior	Los Angeles, CA	Walk-on; Graduated.
Elliott Pitts	G	6'5"	190	Junior	Dublin, CA	Dismissed from the team due to undisclosed reasons. Transferred to Diablo Valley College.
Trey Mason	G	6'2"	195	Junior	Los Angeles, CA	Walk-on; Left team but will continue as a student.
Justin Simon	G	6'5"	200	Freshman	Temecula, CA	Transferred to St. John's.

=== Incoming transfers ===
Name	Pos.	Height	Weight	Year	Hometown	Notes
Talbott Denny	G	6'6"	210	RS Senior	Tucson, AZ	Graduate transfer from Lipscomb.
Keanu Pinder	F	6'8"	220	Junior	Perth, AU	Junior college transfer from Hutchinson Community College.
Dylan Smith	G	6'5"	170	Sophomore	Mobile, AL	Transferred after freshman year from UNC Asheville. Will sit out for 2016–17 season due to NCAA transfer rules and have three years of eligibility starting in 2017–18.

=== 2016 recruiting class ===
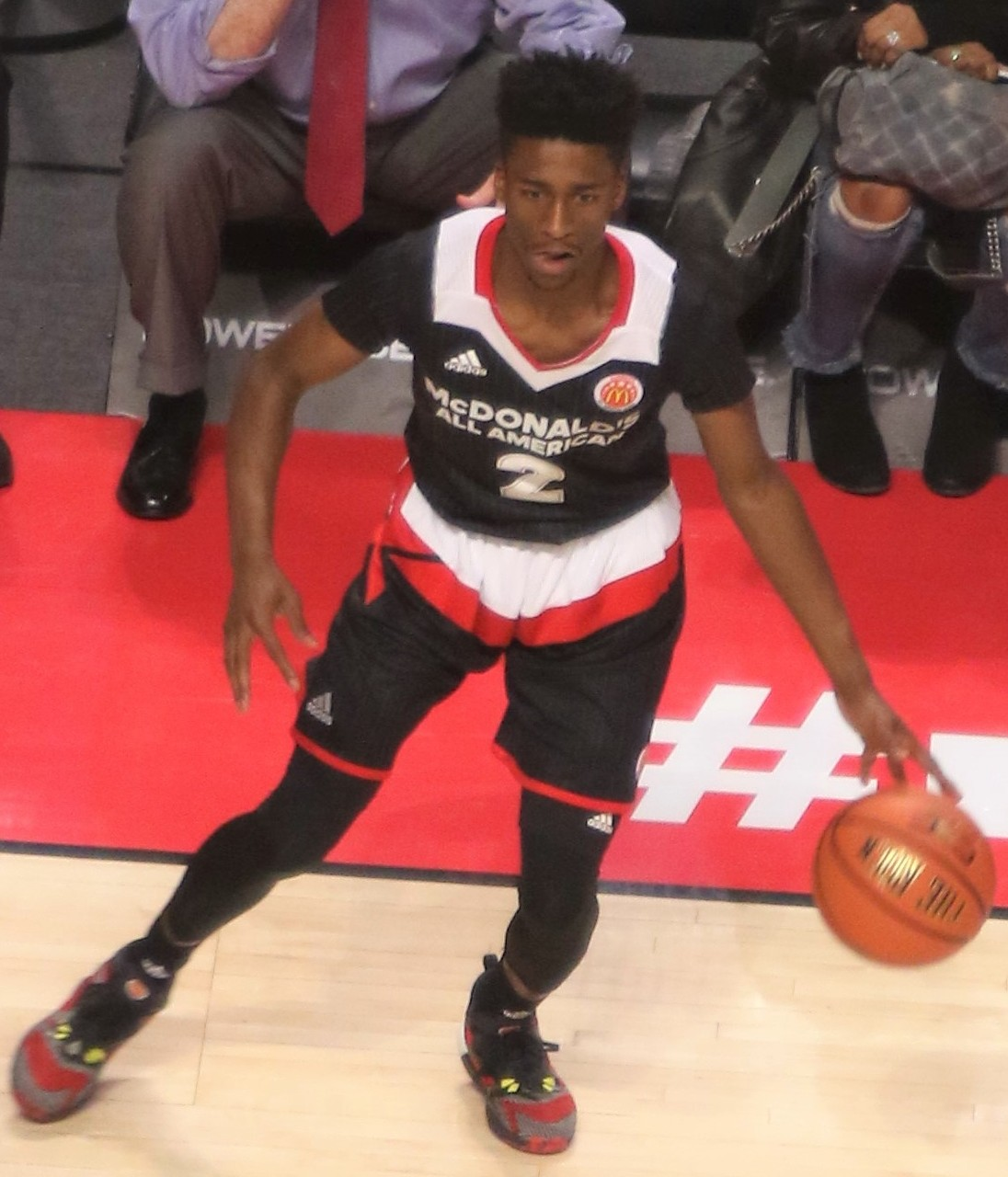
Kobi Simmons at the 2016 McDonald's All-American Game

Arizona's recruiting class has been ranked among the top 5 in the nation. However, due to eligibility concerns, five-star recruit Terrance Ferguson chose to play internationally and not attend Arizona.

College recruiting
Name	Hometown	School	Height	Weight	Commit date
Lauri Markkanen; F/C	Helsinki, FI	Helsinki Basketball Academy	6 ft 11 in (2.11 m)	225 lb (102 kg)	Oct 17, 2015
Lauri Markkanen; F/C	Recruit ratings: Scout: Rivals: 247Sports: ESPN: (96)				
Kobi Simmons; PG	Alpharetta, GA	St. Francis HS	6 ft 5 in (1.96 m)	170 lb (77 kg)	Jan 16, 2016
Kobi Simmons; PG	Recruit ratings: Scout: Rivals: 247Sports: ESPN: (92)				
Rawle Alkins; SG	Middle Village, NY	Word of God Christian Academy	6 ft 4 in (1.93 m)	200 lb (91 kg)	Mar 7, 2016
Rawle Alkins; SG	Recruit ratings: Scout: Rivals: 247Sports: ESPN: (92)				
Overall recruit ranking: Scout: #7 Rivals: #3 247Sports: #5 ESPN: #7
Note: In many cases, Scout, Rivals, 247Sports, On3, and ESPN may conflict in their listings of height and weight.; In these cases, the average was taken. ESPN grades are on a 100-point scale.; Sources: "Arizona 2016 Basketball Commitments". Rivals.; "2016 Arizona Basketball Commits". Scout.; "2016 Arizona Wildcats Recruiting Class". ESPN.; "Scout.com Team Recruiting Rankings". Scout.; "2016 Team Ranking". Rivals.; "2016 Arizona 24/7 Sports Commits". 247Sports.

Recruits at the 2017 McDonald's All-American Boys Game

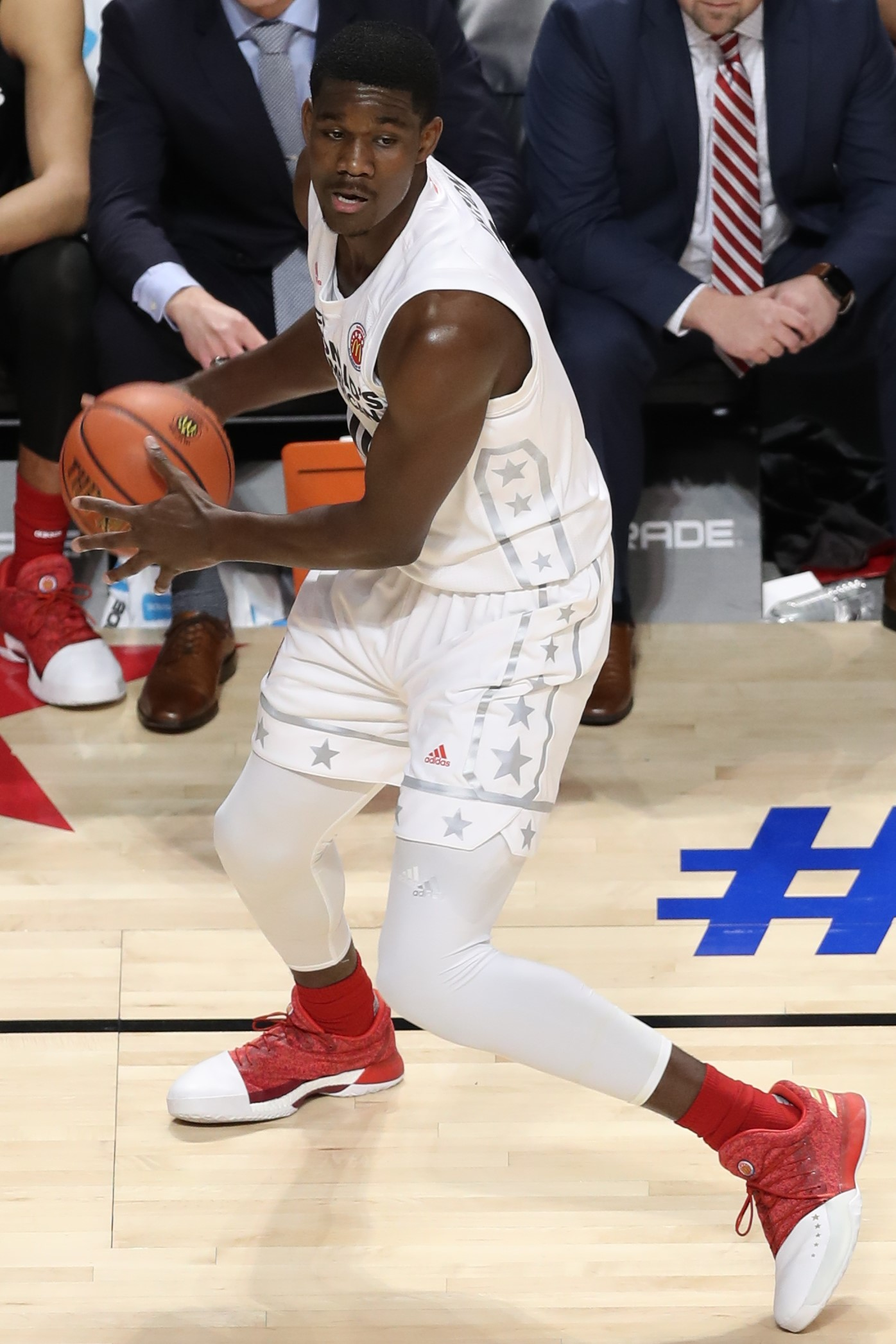
Deandre Ayton, Arizona

College recruiting (2017)
Name	Hometown	School	Height	Weight	Commit date
Alex Barcello; PG	Tempe, AZ	Corona del Sol HS	6 ft 2 in (1.88 m)	175 lb (79 kg)	Aug 26, 2016
Alex Barcello; PG	Recruit ratings: Scout: Rivals: 247Sports: ESPN: (83)				
Deandre Ayton; C	Nassau, Bahamas	Hillcrest Prep Academy (AZ)	7 ft 0 in (2.13 m)	220 lb (100 kg)	Sep 6, 2016
Deandre Ayton; C	Recruit ratings: Scout: Rivals: 247Sports: ESPN: (97)				
Brandon Randolph; SG	Yonkers, NY	Westtown School (PA)	6 ft 6 in (1.98 m)	180 lb (82 kg)	Oct 12, 2016
Brandon Randolph; SG	Recruit ratings: Scout: Rivals: 247Sports: ESPN: (89)				
Ira Lee; PF	Los Angeles, CA	Crossroads School	6 ft 8 in (2.03 m)	225 lb (102 kg)	Oct 20, 2016
Ira Lee; PF	Recruit ratings: Scout: Rivals: 247Sports: ESPN: (85)				
Emmanuel Akot; F/G	Winnipeg, MB	Wasatch Academy (UT)	6 ft 8 in (2.03 m)	185 lb (84 kg)	Mar 9, 2017
Emmanuel Akot; F/G	Recruit ratings: Scout: Rivals: 247Sports: ESPN: (88)				
Overall recruit ranking: Scout: #3 Rivals: #3 247Sports: #3 ESPN: #3
Note: In many cases, Scout, Rivals, 247Sports, On3, and ESPN may conflict in their listings of height and weight.; In these cases, the average was taken. ESPN grades are on a 100-point scale.; Sources: "Arizona 2017 Basketball Commitments". Rivals.; "2017 Arizona Basketball Commits". Scout.; "2017 Arizona Wildcats Recruiting Class". ESPN.; "Scout.com Team Recruiting Rankings". Scout.; "2017 Team Ranking". Rivals.; "2017 Arizona 24/7 Sports Commits". 247Sports.

== Personnel ==
=== Roster ===
2016–17 Arizona Wildcats men's basketball team
Players
Coaches

Pos.	#	Name	Height	Weight	Year	Previous school	Hometown
G	0	Parker Jackson-Cartwright	5 ft 11 in (1.8 m)	170 lb (77 kg)	Jr	Sierra Canyon School	Los Angeles, CA
G	1	Rawle Alkins	6 ft 5 in (1.96 m)	220 lb (100 kg)	Fr	Word of God Christian	Brooklyn, NY
G	2	Kobi Simmons	6 ft 5 in (1.96 m)	175 lb (79 kg)	Fr	St. Francis HS	Atlanta, GA
G	3	Dylan Smith (redshirt)	6 ft 5 in (1.96 m)	170 lb (77 kg)	So	UNC Asheville	Mobile, AL
G	5	Kadeem Allen	6 ft 3 in (1.91 m)	205 lb (93 kg)	RS Sr	Hutchinson C.C.	Wilmington, NC
F	10	Lauri Markkanen	7 ft 0 in (2.13 m)	230 lb (104 kg)	Fr	Helsinki Basketball Academy	Jyväskylä, FI
C	14	Dušan Ristić	7 ft 0 in (2.13 m)	245 lb (111 kg)	Jr	Sunrise Christian Academy	Novi Sad, RS
G	20	Talbott Denny (injured)	6 ft 5 in (1.96 m)	215 lb (98 kg)	RS Sr	Lipscomb	Tucson, AZ
C	21	Chance Comanche	6 ft 11 in (2.11 m)	215 lb (98 kg)	So	Beverly Hills HS	Beverly Hills, CA
F	24	Ray Smith (injured)	6 ft 8 in (2.03 m)	220 lb (100 kg)	RS Fr	Las Vegas HS	Las Vegas, NV
F	25	Keanu Pinder	6 ft 9 in (2.06 m)	220 lb (100 kg)	Jr	Hutchinson C.C.	Perth, AU
G	35	Allonzo Trier	6 ft 5 in (1.96 m)	205 lb (93 kg)	So	Findlay Prep	Seattle, WA
G	50	Tyler Trillo (W)	5 ft 11 in (1.8 m)	170 lb (77 kg)	RS So	Roger Williams	Southbury, CT
G	51	Paulo Cruz (W)	6 ft 4 in (1.93 m)	210 lb (95 kg)	So	Francis Parker School	San Diego, CA
G	52	Kory Jones (W)	6 ft 3 in (1.91 m)	170 lb (77 kg)	Fr	Westfield HS	Herndon, VA
F	55	Jake Desjardins (W)	6 ft 6 in (1.98 m)	215 lb (98 kg)	Fr	Coronado HS	Henderson, NV

Head coach

- Sean Miller (Pittsburgh)

Assistant coach(es)

- Joe Pasternack (Indiana)
- Emanuel Richardson (Pitt–Johnstown)
- Mark Phelps (Old Dominion)

Legend

- (C) Team captain
- (S) Suspended
- (I) Ineligible
- (W) Walk-on
- Injured
- Current redshirt

Roster

- Aug 24, 2016 – Talbott Denny will miss the 2016–17 season after tearing his left ACL.
- Nov 1, 2016 – Allonzo Trier suspended indefinitely for a test positive for PED. On Jan. 20, it was announced Trier would make his return for the UCLA game after 19 game absence.
- Nov 1, 2016 – Sean Miller announced in a statement that Chance Comanche suspended indefinitely due to academic reasons. Suspension was lifted by season opener.
- Nov 3, 2016 – Ray Smith tore his ACL in his right knee in the team's first exhibition game on November 1. Two days later, Smith announced on Twitter that he will end his basketball career.
- Nov 30, 2016 – Parker Jackson-Cartwright suffered a high ankle sprain during game against Texas Southern. Made return for conference opener on December 30.

==== Depth chart ====
- before Jan. 20

Pos.	Starting 5	Bench 1	Bench 2
C	Dušan Ristić	Chance Comanche
PF	Lauri Markkanen	Keanu Pinder	Jake Dejardins
SF	Rawle Alkins		Paulo Cruz
SG	Kobi Simmons		Kory Jones
PG	Kadeem Allen	Parker Jackson-Cartwright	Tyler Trillo

- after Jan. 20

Pos.	Starting 5	Bench 1	Bench 2
C	Dušan Ristić	Chance Comanche
PF	Lauri Markkanen	Keanu Pinder	Jake Dejardins
SF	Rawle Alkins		Paulo Cruz
SG	Allonzo Trier	Kobi Simmons	Kory Jones
PG	Kadeem Allen	Parker Jackson-Cartwright	Tyler Trillo

=== Coaching staff ===
Name	Position	Year at Arizona	Alma Mater (year)
Sean Miller	Head coach	8th	Pittsburgh (1992)
Joe Pasternack	Associate head coach	6th	Indiana (1999)
Emanuel Richardson	Assistant coach	8th	Pittsburgh-Johnstown (1998)
Mark Phelps	Assistant coach	2nd	Old Dominion (1996)
Ryan Reynolds	Director of Basketball Operations	8th	Xavier (2007)
Austin Carroll	Assistant director of Basketball Operations	1st	American (2014)

== Schedule and results ==
In Arizona's non-conference schedule the team hosted Cal State Bakersfield, Grand Canyon, New Mexico, Texas Southern, UC Irvine, Northern Colorado and Sacred Heart. Arizona had one true road game against Missouri. The Wildcats also played five games in four neutral sites. They played Michigan State in the Armed Forces Classic at Joint Base Pearl Harbor–Hickam in Honolulu, Hawaii (later announced that game was moved to Stan Sheriff Center to accommodate more fans), Gonzaga in the first ever HoopHall LA event at Staples Center in Los Angeles, California, Texas A&M at the Toyota Center in Houston, Texas, and also played at Orleans Arena as part in the Las Vegas Invitational in Las Vegas, where they face off against three of the following: Butler, Santa Clara or Vanderbilt.

In the unbalanced 18-game Pac-12 schedule, the team will face neither the Rocky Mountain teams (Colorado/Utah) on the road, nor the Oregon teams (Oregon/Oregon State) at home.

Arizona's pre-season Red-Blue scrimmage took place on October 14, 2016 at McKale Center. The Red team beat the Blue, 53–49.

Date time, TV	Rank^{#}	Opponent^{#}	Result	Record	High points	High rebounds	High assists	Site (attendance) city, state
Exhibition
Nov. 1, 2016*; 7:30 pm, P12N	No. 10	College of Idaho	W 86–35	–	17 – Simmons	11 – Pinder	8 – Allen	McKale Center (13,844); Tucson, AZ
Nov. 6, 2016*; 4:00 pm, P12N	No. 10	Chico State	W 78–70	–	21 – Markkanen	7 – Markkanen	6 – Jackson-Cartwright	McKale Center (14,323); Tucson, AZ
Non-conference regular season
Nov. 11, 2016*; 5:00 pm, ESPN	No. 10	vs. No. 12 Michigan State; Armed Forces Classic	W 65–63	1–0	18 – Simmons	6 – Tied	3 – Jackson-Cartwright	Stan Sheriff Center (9,475); Honolulu, HI
Nov. 15, 2016*; 8:00 pm, P12N	No. 10	Cal State Bakersfield	W 78–66	2–0	26 – Markkanen	8 – Markkanen	5 – Jackson-Cartwright	McKale Center (14,214); Tucson, AZ
Nov. 18, 2016*; 8:00 pm, P12N	No. 10	Sacred Heart; Las Vegas Invitational campus-site game	W 95–65	3–0	22 – Markkanen	15 – Ristić	4 – Jackson-Cartwright	McKale Center (14,392); Tucson, AZ
Nov. 21, 2016*; 7:00 pm, P12N	No. 8	Northern Colorado; Las Vegas Invitational campus-site game	W 71–55	4–0	17 – Markkanen	13 – Markkanen	11 – Jackson-Cartwright	McKale Center (14,397); Tucson, AZ
Nov. 24, 2016*; 8:30 pm, FS1	No. 8	vs. Santa Clara; Las Vegas Invitational semifinal	W 69–61	5–0	16 – Markkanen	9 – Markkanen	6 – Jackson-Cartwright	Orleans Arena (2,537); Paradise, NV
Nov. 25, 2016*; 8:30 pm, FS1	No. 8	vs. Butler; Las Vegas Invitational championship	L 65–69	5–1	15 – Markkanen	6 – Tied	8 – Jackson-Cartwright	Orleans Arena (3,000); Paradise, NV
Nov. 30, 2016*; 7:00 pm, P12N	No. 16	Texas Southern	W 85–63	6–1	19 – Markkanen	6 – Tied	7 – Allen	McKale Center (14,410); Tucson, AZ
Dec. 3, 2016*; 3:30 pm, ESPN	No. 16	vs. No. 8 Gonzaga; HoopHall LA	L 62–69	6–2	16 – Alkins	8 – Markkanen	3 – Allen	Staples Center; Los Angeles, CA
Dec. 6, 2016*; 8:00 pm, P12N	No. 20	UC Irvine	W 79–57	7–2	18 – Tied	10 – Ristić	6 – Allen	McKale Center (14,208); Tucson, AZ
Dec. 10, 2016*; 10:00 am, ESPN2	No. 20	at Missouri	W 79–60	8–2	19 – Tied	9 – Tied	4 – Allen	Mizzou Arena (10,151); Columbia, MO
Dec. 14, 2016*; 9:00 pm, ESPNU	No. 19	Grand Canyon	W 64–54	9–2	13 – Simmons	8 – Tied	4 – Alkins	McKale Center (13,477); Tucson, AZ
Dec. 17, 2016*; 10:00 am, ESPN2	No. 19	vs. Texas A&M; Lone Star Shootout	W 67–63	10–2	18 – Ristić	7 – Tied	6 – Alkins	Toyota Center (8,777); Houston, TX
Dec. 20, 2016*; 7:00 pm, P12N	No. 18	New Mexico	W 77–46	11–2	14 – Comanche	11 – Alkins	5 – Allen	McKale Center (14,008); Tucson, AZ
Pac-12 regular season
Dec. 30, 2016; 9:00 pm, ESPN2	No. 18	at California	W 67–62	12–2 (1–0)	16 – Ristić	10 – Markkanen	4 – Tied	Haas Pavilion (10,844); Berkeley, CA
Jan. 1, 2017; 6:00 pm, P12N	No. 18	at Stanford	W 91–52	13–2 (2–0)	19 – Alkins	10 – Comanche	6 – Jackson-Cartwright	Maples Pavilion (4,396); Stanford, CA
Jan. 5, 2017; 8:00 pm, FS1	No. 17	Utah	W 66–56	14–2 (3–0)	18 – Ristić	9 – Markkanen	9 – Jackson-Cartwright	McKale Center (14,302); Tucson, AZ
Jan. 7, 2017; 7:30 pm, P12N	No. 17	Colorado	W 82–73	15–2 (4–0)	22 – Markkanen	8 – Ristić	6 – Jackson-Cartwright	McKale Center (14,644); Tucson, AZ
Jan. 12, 2017; 7:00 pm, ESPN2	No. 16	Arizona State; Rivalry	W 91–75	16–2 (5–0)	30 – Markkanen	8 – Markkanen	8 – Allen	McKale Center (14,644); Tucson, AZ
Jan. 19, 2017; 7:00 pm, P12N	No. 14	at USC	W 73–66	17–2 (6–0)	23 – Markkanen	12 – Ristić	3 – Tied	Galen Center (4,930); Los Angeles, CA
Jan. 21, 2017; 2:00 pm, CBS	No. 14	at No. 3 UCLA; Rivalry	W 96–85	18–2 (7–0)	20 – Simmons	7 – Tied	5 – Simmons	Pauley Pavilion (13,659); Los Angeles, CA
Jan. 26, 2017; 7:30 pm, P12N	No. 7	Washington State	W 79–62	19–2 (8–0)	17 – Trier	13 – Markkanen	7 – Trier	McKale Center (14,644); Tucson, AZ
Jan. 29, 2017; 1:30 pm, FOX	No. 7	Washington	W 77–66	20–2 (9–0)	14 – Allen	8 – Tied	5 – Allen	McKale Center (14,644); Tucson, AZ
Feb. 2, 2017; 7:00 pm, ESPN2	No. 5	at Oregon State	W 71–54	21–2 (10–0)	18 – Trier	9 – Markkanen	3 – Tied	Gill Coliseum (4,745); Corvallis, OR
Feb. 4, 2017; 2:00 pm, ESPN	No. 5	at No. 13 Oregon	L 58–85	21–3 (10–1)	16 – Alkins	6 – Alkins	4 – Alkins	Matthew Knight Arena (12,364); Eugene, OR
Feb. 8, 2017; 9:00 pm, FS1	No. 9	Stanford	W 74–67	22–3 (11–1)	22 – Trier	7 – Trier	6 – Allen	McKale Center (14,644); Tucson, AZ
Feb. 11, 2017; 8:00 pm, ESPN2	No. 9	California	W 62–57	23–3 (12–1)	13 – Simmons	5 – Tied	5 – Allen	McKale Center (14,644); Tucson, AZ
Feb. 16, 2017; 7:00 pm, FS1	No. 5	at Washington State	W 78–59	24–3 (13–1)	20 – Jackson-Cartwright	12 – Trier	3 – Tied	Beasley Coliseum (3,448); Pullman, WA
Feb. 18, 2017; 6:00 pm, ESPN2	No. 5	at Washington	W 76–68	25–3 (14–1)	26 – Markkanen	13 – Markkanen	4 – Tied	Alaska Airlines Arena (9,482); Seattle, WA
Feb. 23, 2017; 8:00 pm, P12N	No. 4	USC	W 90–77	26–3 (15–1)	25 – Trier	7 – Markkanen	5 – Jackson-Cartwright	McKale Center (14,644); Tucson, AZ
Feb. 25, 2017; 6:15 pm, ESPN	No. 4	No. 5 UCLA; College GameDay/Rivalry	L 72–77	26–4 (15–2)	28 – Trier	5 – Tied	6 – Jackson-Cartwright	McKale Center (14,644); Tucson, AZ
March 4, 2017; 2:00 pm, CBS	No. 7	at Arizona State; Rivalry	W 73–60	27–4 (16–2)	19 – Trier	15 – Alkins	3 – Allen	Wells Fargo Arena (9,494); Tempe, AZ
Pac-12 Tournament
Mar. 9, 2017; 7:00 pm, P12N	(2) No. 7	vs. (7) Colorado; Quarterfinals	W 92–78	28–4	20 – Markkanen	8 – Ristić	7 – Jackson-Cartwright	T-Mobile Arena (18,153); Paradise, NV
Mar. 10, 2017; 9:30 pm, ESPN	(2) No. 7	vs. (3) No. 3 UCLA; Semifinals/Rivalry	W 86–75	29–4	29 – Markkanen	6 – Markkanen	4 – Tied	T-Mobile Arena (19,224); Paradise, NV
Mar. 11, 2017; 9:00 pm, ESPN	(2) No. 7	vs. (1) No. 5 Oregon; Championship	W 83–80	30–4	23 – Trier	8 – Trier	4 – Allen	T-Mobile Arena (18,927); Paradise, NV
NCAA tournament
Mar. 16, 2017*; 6:50 pm, TBS	(2 W) No. 4	vs. (15 W) North Dakota; First Round	W 100–82	31–4	20 – Tied	7 – Tied	5 – Tied	Vivint Smart Home Arena (16,341); Salt Lake City, UT
Mar. 18, 2017*; 4:45 pm, CBS	(2 W) No. 4	vs. (7 W) No. 22 Saint Mary's; Second Round	W 69–60	32–4	16 – Markkanen	11 – Markkanen	2 – Trier	Vivint Smart Home Arena (18,565); Salt Lake City, UT
Mar. 23, 2017*; 7:10 pm, TBS	(2 W) No. 4	vs. (11 W) Xavier; Sweet Sixteen	L 71–73	32–5	19 – Trier	8 – Markkanen	5 – Jackson-Cartwright	SAP Center (16,884); San Jose, CA
*Non-conference game. ^{#}Rankings from AP Poll. (#) Tournament seedings in parentheses. W=West Region. All times are in Mountain Time.

== Ranking movement ==
Ranking movements Legend: ██ Increase in ranking ██ Decrease in ranking
	Week																			
Poll	Pre	1	2	3	4	5	6	7	8	9	10	11	12	13	14	15	16	17	18	Final
AP	10	10	8	16	20	19	18	18	17	16	14	7	5	9	5	4	7	7	4	Not released
Coaches	11	9	9	15	20	19	18	18	17	16	13	9	5	10	7	4	8	7	4	7

*AP does not release post-NCAA tournament rankings

== Player statistics ==
Player	GP	GS	MPG	FGM-FGA	3PM-3PA	FTM-FTA	RPG	APG	SPG	BPG	PPG
Rawle Alkins	37	36	28.0	143–309	44–119	74–101	4.9	2.1	0.9	0.5	10.9
Kadeem Allen	34	33	30.0	107–236	32–75	86–116	4.0	3.0	1.6	0.6	8.7
Chance Comanche	37	2	18.1	89–156	0–0	54–74	3.6	0.4	0.1	0.4	6.3
Paulo Cruz	8	0	2.6	0–4	0–2	0–0	0.4	0.0	0.0	0.0	0.0
Jake Desjardins	7	0	1.7	0–2	0–0	2–2	0.1	0.0	0.0	0.0	0.3
Parker Jackson-Cartwright	31	10	24.9	57–133	30–71	38–54	2.5	4.1	1.2	0.1	5.9
Kory Jones	4	0	1.8	1–1	1–1	0–0	0.0	0.0	0.0	0.3	0.8
Lauri Markkanen	37	37	30.8	185–376	69–163	137–164	7.2	0.9	0.4	0.5	15.6
Keanu Pinder	35	0	12.0	29–54	1–4	19–33	2.9	0.3	0.5	0.6	2.2
Dušan Ristić	36	34	22.8	164–295	1–2	62–81	5.5	0.4	0.3	0.4	10.9
Kobi Simmons	37	16	23.5	111–281	32–98	69–89	1.6	2.0	0.6	0.1	8.7
Allonzo Trier	18	13	31.9	91–198	34–87	94–116	5.3	2.7	0.4	0.1	17.2
Tyler Trillo	8	0	3.9	0–3	0–3	0–0	0.0	0.5	0.0	0.0	0.0

== Awards and honors ==
=== Preseason Award Watchlists ===
- Allonzo Trier
  - Jerry West Award Watchlist (October 18, 2016)
- Lauri Markkanen
  - Karl Malone Award Watchlist (October 20, 2016)
  - Naismith Award Watchlist (November 10, 2016)
  - Wooden Award Watchlist (November 15, 2016)

=== Midseason awards ===
- Lauri Markkanen
  - Wooden Award Midseason Top 25 (January 12, 2017)
  - Wayman Tisdale Award
    & Oscar Robertson Award Midseason watch list (January 23, 2017)
  - Karl Malone Award Finalist (February 2, 2017)
  - Naismith Trophy Top 30 (February 9, 2017)
  - Wooden Award Midseason Top 20 (January 12, 2017)

=== Season awards ===
- Sean Miller
  - 2017 Werner Ladder Naismith Men's College Coach of the Year semifinalist (March 3, 2017)
  - Pac-12 Coach of the Year (March 7, 2017)
  - Coach of the Year (Bleacher Report, Fox)
  - AP Pac-12 Coach of the Year (March 7, 2017)
  - NABC District 20 Coach of the Year (March 22, 2017)
- Lauri Markkanen
  - 2017 Wooden Award Top 15 Finalist (March 4, 2017)
- Allonzo Trier
  - Pac-12 Tournament MOP (2017)

=== Weekly awards ===
- Lauri Markkanen
  - 2x Pac-12 Player of the Week (January 20, 2017 – February 20, 2017)
  - Oscar Robertson National Player of the Week (January 24, 2017)
  - Naismith Trophy National Player of the Week (February 20, 2017)
  - Wayman Tisdale National Freshman Player of the Week (February 20, 2017)

=== All-Conference Pac-12 team ===
- Lauri Markkanen
  - All-Pac-12 Freshman team (2017)
  - All-Pac-12 first team (2017)
  - All-Pac-12 tournament team (2017)
  - AP All-Pac-12 first team (2017)
- Rawle Alkins
  - All-Pac-12 freshman team (2017)
- Kadeem Allen
  - All-Pac-12 defensive team (2017)
  - All-Pac-12 second team (2017)
- Allonzo Trier
  - All-Pac-12 second team (2017)

=== All-American teams ===
- Lauri Markkanen
  - 2017 All-American 3rd team (AP, USA Today, SN, NBC, B1G Man)
  - District IX All-District team (2017)
  - NABC All-District First Team (District 20, March 22, 2017)

== See also ==
2016–17 Arizona Wildcats women's basketball team
