= 2015–16 Arizona Wildcats men's basketball team =

American college basketball season

2015–16 Arizona Wildcats men's basketball

NCAA tournament, First Round
- Conference: Pac-12 Conference

Ranking
- Coaches: No. 22
- AP: No. 17
- Record: 25–9 (12–6 Pac-12)
- Head coach: Sean Miller (7th season)
- Assistant coaches: Joe Pasternack; Emanuel Richardson; Mark Phelps
- Home arena: McKale Center

2015–16 Pac-12 Conference men's basketball standings
	Conf.				Overall
Team	W		L	PCT	W		L	PCT
No. 5 Oregon †	14	–	4	.778	31	–	7	.816
No. 13 Utah	13	–	5	.722	27	–	9	.750
No. 17 Arizona	12	–	6	.667	25	–	9	.735
No. 23 California	12	–	6	.667	23	–	11	.676
Colorado	10	–	8	.556	22	–	12	.647
USC	9	–	9	.500	21	–	13	.618
Oregon State	9	–	9	.500	19	–	13	.594
Washington	9	–	9	.500	19	–	15	.559
Stanford	8	–	10	.444	15	–	15	.500
UCLA	6	–	12	.333	15	–	17	.469
Arizona State	5	–	13	.278	15	–	17	.469
Washington State	1	–	17	.056	9	–	22	.290
† Pac-12 Tournament winner Rankings from AP poll

The 2015–16 Arizona Wildcats men's basketball team represented the University of Arizona during the 2015–16 NCAA Division I men's basketball season. The team was led by seventh-year head coach Sean Miller, and played their home games at McKale Center in Tucson, Arizona as a member of the Pac-12 Conference. They finished the season 25–9, 12–6 in Pac-12 play to tie with California for third place. They defeated Colorado in the quarterfinals of the Pac-12 tournament to advance to the semifinals where they lost to Oregon. Arizona received an at-large bid to the fourth-straight NCAA tournament, the program's 31st appearance, as a 6-seed in the South Region. They lost in the first round to Wichita State.

== Previous season ==
The 2014–15 Arizona Wildcats finished the season with an overall record of 34–4 and a 16–2 conference record to win their second straight Pac-12 regular season championship (14th overall). Arizona claimed the longest active home winning streak in D-I men's college basketball (38th home win at 2nd all-time, 82nd home win at 5th all-time) after BYU defeated Gonzaga in the regular season finale, snapping the nation's longest active home winning streak of 41 games, as well as Gonzaga's school record 22-game winning streak. In the Pac-12 Tournament as a #1 seed, Arizona defeated #8 seed California Golden Bears; 73–51, and #4 seed UCLA Bruins; 70–64. The Wildcats then went on to beat Oregon Ducks; 80–52 in the Pac-12 Tournament championship game, and claimed their 5th Pac-12 tournament title for the first time since 2002, along with punching their 32nd ticket to the NCAA Tournament. Arizona entered the NCAA tournament as a #2 seed in the West region, and defeated #15 seed Texas Southern Tigers 93–72, then #10 seed Ohio State Buckeyes; 73–58, and #6 seed Xavier Musketeers, to gain its third trip (2nd straight) to the Elite Eight, as well as Sean Miller's first as head coach. The Wildcats then fell to #1 seed Wisconsin Badgers; 85–78 for the second time (from the Elite Eight's by 1 point overtime loss in last year).

== Off-season ==
=== Departures ===
Name	Pos.	Height	Weight	Year	Hometown	Notes
Matt Korcheck	PF	6'10"	235	RS Senior	Tucson, Arizona	Graduated
T. J. McConnell	PG	6'1"	195	RS Senior	Pittsburgh, Pennsylvania	Graduated
Drew Mellon	SF	6’6"	205	Senior	Santa Ana, California	Graduated
Brandon Ashley	PF	6'9"	230	Junior	San Francisco, California	Declared for 2015 NBA draft
Rondae Hollis-Jefferson	SF	6'7"	220	Sophomore	Chester, Pennsylvania	Declared for 2015 NBA draft. Selected 23rd overall by the Portland Trail Blazers; later traded to the Brooklyn Nets.
Stanley Johnson	SF	6'7"	245	Freshman	Fullerton, California	Declared for 2015 NBA draft. Selected 8th overall by the Detroit Pistons.
Craig Victor II	PF	6'9"	230	Freshman	New Orleans, Louisiana	Left team in January. Elected to transfer to LSU

=== Incoming transfers ===
Name	Pos.	Height	Weight	Year	Hometown	Notes
Mark Tollefsen	F	6'9"	200	RS Senior	Danville, California	Graduate transfer from San Francisco. Is eligible to play immediately for the 2015–16 season per NCAA graduate transfer rules.

=== 2015 recruiting class ===
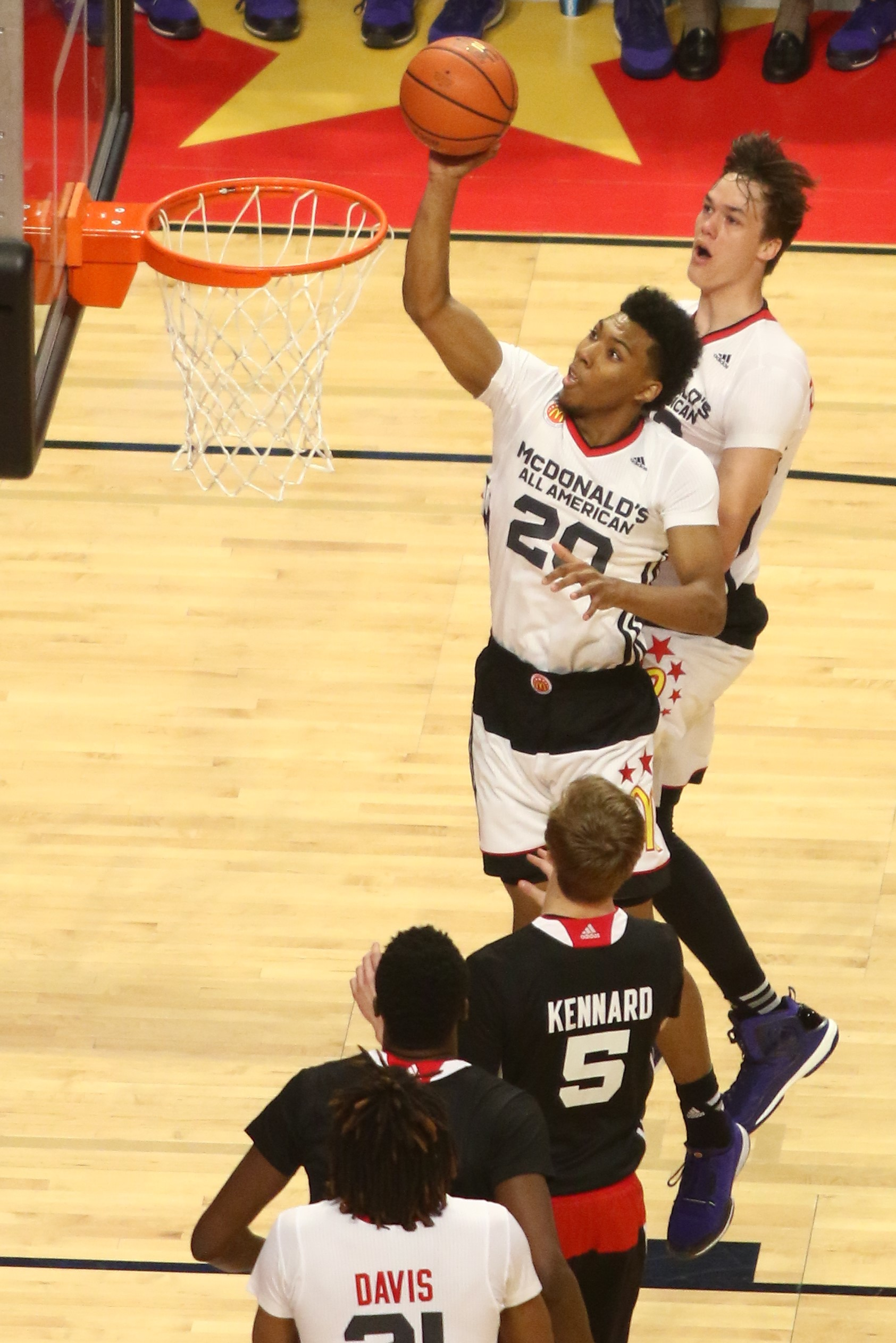
Allonzo Trier at the 2015 McDonald's All-American Boys Game

College recruiting information
Name	Hometown	School	Height	Weight	Commit date
Justin Simon; CG	Temecula, California	Temecula Valley HS/Brewster Academy	6 ft 5 in (1.96 m)	190 lb (86 kg)	May 6, 2014
Justin Simon; CG	Recruit ratings: Scout: Rivals: 247Sports: ESPN:				
Ray Smith; SF	Las Vegas, Nevada	Las Vegas HS	6 ft 8 in (2.03 m)	180 lb (82 kg)	Jul 13, 2014
Ray Smith; SF	Recruit ratings: Scout: Rivals: 247Sports: ESPN:				
Allonzo Trier; SG	Seattle, Washington	Findlay Prep	6 ft 4 in (1.93 m)	190 lb (86 kg)	Aug 3, 2014
Allonzo Trier; SG	Recruit ratings: Scout: Rivals: 247Sports: ESPN:				
Chance Comanche; C	Beverly Hills, California	Beverly Hills HS	6 ft 10 in (2.08 m)	200 lb (91 kg)	Sep 14, 2014
Chance Comanche; C	Recruit ratings: Scout: Rivals: 247Sports: ESPN:				
Overall recruit ranking: Scout: #4 Rivals: #3 247Sports: #4 ESPN: #4
Note: In many cases, Scout, Rivals, 247Sports, On3, and ESPN may conflict in their listings of height and weight.; In these cases, the average was taken. ESPN grades are on a 100-point scale.; Sources: "Arizona 2015 Basketball Commitments". Rivals.; "2015 Arizona Basketball Commits". Scout.; "2015 Arizona Wildcats Recruiting Class". ESPN.; "Scout.com Team Recruiting Rankings". Scout.; "2015 Team Ranking". Rivals.; "2015 Arizona 24/7 Sports Commits". 247Sports.

College recruiting information (2016)
Name	Hometown	School	Height	Weight	Commit date
Lauri Markkanen; PF	Helsinki, Finland	Helsinki Basketball Academy	6 ft 11 in (2.11 m)	225 lb (102 kg)	Oct 17, 2015
Lauri Markkanen; PF	Recruit ratings: Scout: Rivals: 247Sports: ESPN:				
Kobi Simmons; CG	Alpharetta, Georgia	St. Francis HS	6 ft 5 in (1.96 m)	175 lb (79 kg)	Jan 16, 2016
Kobi Simmons; CG	Recruit ratings: Scout: Rivals: 247Sports: ESPN:				
Rawle Alkins; SG	Middle Village, New York	Word of God Christian Academy	6 ft 5 in (1.96 m)	210 lb (95 kg)	Mar 7, 2016
Rawle Alkins; SG	Recruit ratings: Scout: Rivals: 247Sports: ESPN:				
Overall recruit ranking:
Note: In many cases, Scout, Rivals, 247Sports, On3, and ESPN may conflict in their listings of height and weight.; In these cases, the average was taken. ESPN grades are on a 100-point scale.; Sources: "Arizona 2016 Basketball Commitments". Rivals.; "2016 Arizona Basketball Commits". Scout.; "2016 Arizona Wildcats Recruiting Class". ESPN.; "Scout.com Team Recruiting Rankings". Scout.; "2016 Team Ranking". Rivals.; "2016 Arizona 24/7 Sports Commits". 247Sports.

== Personnel ==
On April 13, assistant coach Damon Stoudamire left the team to rejoin the Memphis staff under head coach and former UA player Josh Pastner. On May 22 Mark Phelps, joined the Arizona staff.

=== Roster ===
2015–16 Arizona Wildcats men's basketball team
Players
Coaches

Pos.	#	Name	Height	Weight	Year	Previous school	Hometown
G	0	Parker Jackson-Cartwright	5 ft 11 in (1.8 m)	170 lb (77 kg)	So	Sierra Canyon School	Los Angeles, California
G	1	Gabe York	6 ft 3 in (1.91 m)	190 lb (86 kg)	Sr	Orange Lutheran HS	West Covina, California
F	2	Ray Smith (injured) (redshirt)	6 ft 8 in (2.03 m)	210 lb (95 kg)	Fr	Las Vegas HS	Las Vegas, Nevada
G	3	Justin Simon	6 ft 5 in (1.96 m)	200 lb (91 kg)	Fr	Brewster Academy	Temecula, California
G	5	Kadeem Allen	6 ft 3 in (1.91 m)	200 lb (91 kg)	RS Jr	Hutchinson C.C.	Wilmington, North Carolina
G	11	Allonzo Trier	6 ft 6 in (1.98 m)	210 lb (95 kg)	Fr	Findlay Prep	Seattle, Washington
F	12	Ryan Anderson	6 ft 9 in (2.06 m)	235 lb (107 kg)	RS Sr	Boston College	Lakewood, California
C	14	Dušan Ristić	7 ft 0 in (2.13 m)	255 lb (116 kg)	So	Sunrise Christian Academy	Novi Sad, Serbia
C	21	Chance Comanche	6 ft 11 in (2.11 m)	205 lb (93 kg)	Fr	Beverly Hills HS	Beverly Hills, California
F	23	Mark Tollefsen	6 ft 9 in (2.06 m)	205 lb (93 kg)	RS Sr	San Francisco	Danville, California
G	24	Elliott Pitts	6 ft 5 in (1.96 m)	190 lb (86 kg)	Jr	De La Salle HS	Dublin, California
C	35	Kaleb Tarczewski	7 ft 0 in (2.13 m)	250 lb (113 kg)	Sr	St. Mark's School	Claremont, New Hampshire
G	44	Trey Mason (W)	6 ft 2 in (1.88 m)	195 lb (88 kg)	Jr	Loyola HS	Los Angeles, California
G	50	Jacob Hazzard (W)	6 ft 0 in (1.83 m)	170 lb (77 kg)	Sr	Loyola HS	Los Angeles, California
G	51	Paulo Cruz (W)	6 ft 4 in (1.93 m)	195 lb (88 kg)	Fr	Francis Parker School	San Diego, California

Head coach

- Sean Miller (Pittsburgh)

Assistant coach(es)

- Joe Pasternack (Indiana)
- Emanuel Richardson (Pitt–Johnstown)
- Mark Phelps (Old Dominion)

Legend

- (C) Team captain
- (S) Suspended
- (I) Ineligible
- (W) Walk-on
- Injured
- Current redshirt

Roster
Last update: January 19, 2016

- Oct 24, 2015 – Freshman Ray Smith to miss entire 2015–16 season due to a torn ACL in his right knee.
- Dec 1, 2015 – Senior Kaleb Tarczewski missed 8 games due to left foot injury. Returned for Pac-12 season play against Arizona State.
- Jan 10, 2015 – Freshman Allonzo Trier missed 7 games due to a right hand injury. Returned Feb. 6 game at Washington.
- Junior Elliott Pitts out since Dec. 9 game against Fresno State, due to an undisclosed personal issue.
  After the Feb. 17 game against Arizona State, Sean Miller announced Pitts would not return for the remainder of the season.

==== Depth chart ====
Pos.	Starting 5	Bench 1	Bench 2	Bench 3
C	Kaleb Tarczewski	Dušan Ristić
PF	Ryan Anderson	Chance Comanche
SF	Allonzo Trier	Mark Tollefsen	Elliott Pitts	Ray Smith
SG	Gabe York	Justin Simon	Trey Mason	Paulo Cruz
PG	Kadeem Allen	Parker Jackson-Cartwright	Jacob Hazzard

=== Coaching staff ===
Name	Position	Year at Arizona	Alma Mater (year)
Sean Miller	Head coach	7th	Pittsburgh (1992)
Joe Pasternack	Associate head coach	5th	Indiana (1999)
Emanuel Richardson	Assistant coach	7th	Pittsburgh-Johnstown (1998)
Mark Phelps	Assistant coach	1st	Old Dominion (1996)
Ryan Reynolds	Director of Basketball Operations	7th	Xavier (2007)
Ben Tucker	Assistant director of Basketball Operations	2nd	Arizona (2010)

== Schedule ==
Date time, TV	Rank^{#}	Opponent^{#}	Result	Record	High points	High rebounds	High assists	Site (attendance) city, state
Exhibition
Nov 8, 2015*; 6:00 pm, P12N	No. 12	Chico State	W 90–54	–	19 – Anderson	10 – Anderson	4 – Allen	McKale Center (14,268); Tucson, Arizona
Non-conference regular season
Nov 13, 2015*; 7:30 pm, P12N	No. 12	Pacific	W 79–61	1–0	19 – Anderson	12 – Anderson	5 – Allen	McKale Center (14,644); Tucson, Arizona
Nov 16, 2015*; 6:00 pm, P12N	No. 12	Bradley	W 90–60	2–0	22 – Trier	7 – Tarczewski	7 – Pitts	McKale Center (14,238); Tucson, Arizona
Nov 19, 2015*; 6:30 pm, P12N	No. 12	Boise State; Wooden Legacy campus-site game	W 88–76	3–0	23 – York	15 – Anderson	6 – Allen	McKale Center (14,644); Tucson, Arizona
Nov 22, 2015*; 6:00 pm, P12N	No. 12	Northwestern State	W 61–42	4–0	18 – York	10 – Ristić	6 – Jackson-Cartwright	McKale Center (14,396); Tucson, Arizona
Nov 26, 2015*; 9:30 pm, ESPN2	No. 11	vs. Santa Clara; Wooden Legacy Quarterfinals	W 75–73 ^{OT}	5–0	17 – Anderson	11 – Anderson	7 – Jackson-Cartwright	Titan Gym (2,460); Fullerton, California
Nov 27, 2015*; 9:30 pm, ESPN2	No. 11	vs. Providence; Wooden Legacy Semifinals	L 65–69	5–1	27 – Anderson	12 – Anderson	4 – Allen	Titan Gym (2,873); Fullerton, California
Nov 29, 2015*; 2:30 pm, ESPNU	No. 11	vs. Boise State; Wooden Legacy 3rd Place Game	W 68–59	6–1	13 – Tied	7 – Tied	2 – Tied	Honda Center (4,393); Anaheim, California
Dec 5, 2015*; 1:15 pm, ESPN	No. 19	at No. 13 Gonzaga	W 68–63	7–1	18 – York	6 – 3 Tied	2 – 3 Tied	McCarthey Athletic Center (6,000); Spokane, Washington
Dec 9, 2015*; 7:00 pm, P12N	No. 13	Fresno State	W 85–72	8–1	27 – Trier	8 – Anderson	5 – Allen	McKale Center (14,262); Tucson, Arizona
Dec 13, 2015*; 6:00 pm, P12N	No. 13	Missouri	W 88–52	9–1	17 – Tollefsen	10 – Comanche	5 – Jackson-Cartwright	McKale Center (14,644); Tucson, Arizona
Dec 16, 2015*; 8:00 pm, P12N	No. 13	Northern Arizona	W 92–37	10–1	19 – Tollefsen	12 – Anderson	7 – Allen	McKale Center (13,566); Tucson, Arizona
Dec 19, 2015*; 7:30 pm, ESPN2	No. 13	UNLV	W 82–70	11–1	20 – Ristić	13 – Anderson	5 – Allen	McKale Center (14,644); Tucson, Arizona
Dec 22, 2015*; 7:00 pm, P12N	No. 8	Long Beach State	W 85–70	12–1	20 – Trier	14 – Anderson	4 – Allen	McKale Center (14,644); Tucson, Arizona
Pac-12 regular season
Jan 3, 2016; 12:00 pm, FS1	No. 8	at Arizona State; Rivalry	W 94–82	13–1 (1–0)	22 – York	10 – Anderson	6 – York	Wells Fargo Arena (8,044); Tempe, Arizona
Jan 7, 2016; 7:00 pm, ESPN2	No. 7	at UCLA; Rivalry	L 84–87	13–2 (1–1)	15 – Anderson	15 – Anderson	4 – Allen	Pauley Pavilion (12,026); Los Angeles, California
Jan 9, 2016; 5:00 pm, P12N	No. 7	at USC	L 101–103 ^{4OT}	13–3 (1–2)	25 – Trier	12 – Tarczewski	5 – York	Galen Center (6,854); Los Angeles, California
Jan 14, 2016; 7:00 pm, FS1	No. 18	Washington	W 99–67	14–3 (2–2)	21 – Anderson	13 – Tarczewski	11 – Jackson-Cartwright	McKale Center (14,479); Tucson, Arizona
Jan 16, 2016; 7:30 pm, P12N	No. 18	Washington State	W 90–66	15–3 (3–2)	15 – Anderson	8 – Tied	7 – Jackson-Cartwright	McKale Center (14,502); Tucson, Arizona
Jan 21, 2016; 9:00 pm, P12N	No. 12	at Stanford	W 71–57	16–3 (4–2)	19 – York	9 – Ristić	4 – Tied	Maples Pavilion (5,275); Stanford, California
Jan 23, 2016; 6:30 pm, ESPN	No. 12	at California	L 73–74	16–4 (4–3)	15 – York	9 – Anderson	6 – Jackson-Cartwright	Haas Pavilion (11,858); Berkeley, California
Jan 28, 2016; 7:00 pm, ESPN2	No. 18	No. 23 Oregon	L 75–83	16–5 (4–4)	22 – Anderson	10 – Anderson	10 – Allen	McKale Center (14,644); Tucson, Arizona
Jan 30, 2016; 7:30 pm, P12N	No. 18	Oregon State	W 80–63	17–5 (5–4)	24 – York	12 – Anderson	6 – Allen	McKale Center (14,644); Tucson, Arizona
Feb 3, 2016; 8:00 pm, P12N	No. 23	at Washington State	W 79–64	18–5 (6–4)	31 – Anderson	12 – Anderson	4 – Jackson-Cartwright	Beasley Coliseum (3,189); Pullman, Washington
Feb 6, 2016; 2:30 pm, FOX	No. 23	at Washington	W 77–72	19–5 (7–4)	22 – Anderson	15 – Anderson	3 – Allen	Alaska Airlines Arena (9,266); Seattle, Washington
Feb 12, 2016; 7:00 pm, ESPN	No. 17	UCLA; Rivalry	W 81–75	20–5 (8–4)	18 – Trier	14 – Tarczewski	4 – Jackson-Cartwright	McKale Center (14,644); Tucson, Arizona
Feb 14, 2016; 6:00 pm, FS1	No. 17	No. 23 USC	W 86–78	21–5 (9–4)	17 – York	9 – Tied	5 – Jackson-Cartwright	McKale Center (14,644); Tucson, Arizona
Feb 17, 2016; 7:00 pm, ESPN2	No. 12	Arizona State; Rivalry	W 99–61	22–5 (10–4)	20 – Trier	15 – Tarczewski	7 – Jackson-Cartwright	McKale Center (14,644); Tucson, Arizona
Feb 24, 2016; 7:00 pm, ESPN2	No. 9	at Colorado	L 72–75	22–6 (10–5)	19 – Anderson	10 – Anderson	3 – Tied	Coors Events Center (11,309); Boulder, Colorado
Feb 27, 2016; 12:00 pm, ESPN	No. 9	at No. 22 Utah	L 64–70	22–7 (10–6)	23 – Trier	10 – Tarczewski	3 – York	Jon M. Huntsman Center (15,508); Salt Lake City, Utah
Mar 3, 2016; 7:00 pm, ESPN	No. 18	No. 25 California	W 64–61	23–7 (11–6)	19 – York	12 – Tarczewski	6 – Allen	McKale Center (14,644); Tucson, Arizona
Mar 5, 2016; 2:00 pm, CBS	No. 18	Stanford	W 94–62	24–7 (12–6)	32 – York	12 – Anderson	6 – Allen	McKale Center (14,644); Tucson, Arizona
Pac-12 Tournament
Mar 10, 2016; 3:30 pm, P12N	(4) No. 15	vs. (5) Colorado; Quarterfinals	W 82–78	25–7	23 – Trier	11 – Tarczewski	2 – 3 Tied	MGM Grand Garden Arena (12,916); Paradise, Nevada
Mar 11, 2016; 7:00 pm, P12N	(4) No. 15	vs. (1) No. 8 Oregon; Semifinals	L 89–95 ^{OT}	25–8	21 – York	12 – Tarczewski	5 – Jackson-Cartwright	MGM Grand Garden Arena (12,916); Paradise, Nevada
NCAA tournament
Mar 17, 2016*; 6:20 pm, TNT	(6 S) No. 17	vs. (11 S) Wichita State; First Round	L 55–65	25–9	11 – Allen	11 – Anderson	2 – Tied	Dunkin' Donuts Center (11,559); Providence, Rhode Island
*Non-conference game. ^{#}Rankings from AP Poll. (#) Tournament seedings in parentheses. S=South Region. All times are in Mountain Time.

== Ranking movement ==
Ranking movement Legend: ██ Increase in ranking. ██ Decrease in ranking. RV=Received votes.
Poll	Pre	Wk 2	Wk 3	Wk 4	Wk 5	Wk 6	Wk 7	Wk 8	Wk 9	Wk 10	Wk 11	Wk 12	Wk 13	Wk 14	Wk 15	Wk 16	Wk 17	Wk 18	Post	Final
AP	12	12	11	19	13	13	8	8	7	18	12	18	23	17	12	9	18	15	17	N/A*
Coaches	10	10	10	14	12	12	8	7	6	16	11	15	20	14	12	10	16	14	16	22

*AP does not release post-NCAA tournament rankings

== Player statistics ==
- As of Mar. 21, 2016

Player	GP	GS	MPG	FGM-FGA	3PM-3PA	FTM-FTA	RPG	APG	SPG	BPG	PPG
Kadeem Allen	34	28	24.9	100–215	18–50	67–95	3.1	3.5	1.0	0.8	8.4
Ryan Anderson	33	33	29.2	174–319	2–7	155–208	10.1	0.8	0.7	0.6	15.3
Chance Comanche	23	0	6.0	16–33	0–0	11–16	1.6	0.2	0.0	0.3	1.9
Paulo Cruz	6	0	2.7	0–2	0–2	0–0	0	0	0	0	0
Jacob Hazzard	7	0	3.7	6–10	4–6	2–2	0.1	0.3	0	0	2.6
Parker Jackson-Cartwright	34	6	21.2	57–142	27–72	37–57	1.6	3.4	0.6	0.2	5.2
Elliott Pitts	7	2	21.3	7–26	2–16	0–2	2.3	1.8	1.1	0	2.3
Dušan Ristić	34	9	16.5	94–171	3–8	52–82	3.8	0.8	0.1	0.7	7.1
Justin Simon	24	0	7.5	23–46	1–3	9–21	1.2	0.3	0.3	0.2	2.3
Kaleb Tarczewski	26	24	27.4	80–150	0–0	84–118	9.3	0.6	0.3	1.4	9.4
Mark Tollefsen	34	13	21.9	90–175	26–73	31–39	3.0	1.3	0.6	0.7	7.0
Allonzo Trier	27	21	28.0	122–262	40–110	115–145	3.3	1.1	0.5	0.2	14.8
Gabe York	34	34	33.3	177–419	98–233	59–78	3.2	2.2	0.9	0.3	15.0

== Honors ==
=== Award Watchlists ===
- Kareem Abdul-Jabbar Award – Kaleb Tarczewski
- Wooden Award Preseason Top 50 – Kaleb Tarczewski
- Jerry West Award – Allonzo Trier
- Wooden Award Midseason Top 25 – Ryan Anderson
- Naismith Memorial Basketball Hall of Fame - 2016 Karl Malone Power Forward of the Year Finalist – Ryan Anderson
- Lute Olson National Player of the Year Award Finalist – Ryan Anderson

=== Weekly awards ===
Name	awards
Allonzo Trier	Pac-12 Player of the Week – Dec.14
Ryan Anderson	Pac-12 Player of the Week – Feb. 8 Naismith Trophy Player of the Week – Feb. 7 Oscar Robertson National Player of the Week – Feb. 7
Gabe York	Pac-12 Player of the Week – Mar. 7

=== Season awards ===
Name	awards
Ryan Anderson	All-Pac-12 First Team
Kaleb Tarczewski	All-Pac-12 Second Team
Kaleb Tarczewski	All-Pac-12 Defensive Team
Gabe York	All-Pac-12 Second Team
Allonzo Trier	Pac-12 All Freshman Team

== See also ==
2015–16 Arizona Wildcats women's basketball team
