= 2017–18 Arizona Wildcats men's basketball team =

American college basketball season

2017–18 Arizona Wildcats men's basketball

Pac-12 regular season & tournament champions

NCAA tournament, First Round
- Conference: Pac-12 Conference

Ranking
- AP: No. 12
- Record: 9–8, 18 wins vacated (3–4 Pac-12, 11 wins vacated)
- Head coach: Sean Miller (9th season)
- Associate head coach: Lorenzo Romar
- Assistant coaches: Austin Carroll; Mark Phelps
- Home arena: McKale Center

2017–18 Pac-12 Conference men's basketball standings
	Conf.				Overall
Team	W		L	PCT	W		L	PCT
No. 12 Arizona †	14	–	4	.778	27	–	8	.771
USC	12	–	6	.667	24	–	12	.667
UCLA	11	–	7	.611	21	–	12	.636
Utah	11	–	7	.611	23	–	12	.657
Stanford	11	–	7	.611	19	–	16	.543
Oregon	10	–	8	.556	23	–	13	.639
Washington	10	–	8	.556	21	–	13	.618
Colorado	8	–	10	.444	17	–	15	.531
Arizona State	8	–	10	.444	20	–	12	.625
Oregon State	7	–	11	.389	16	–	16	.500
Washington State	4	–	14	.222	12	–	19	.387
California	2	–	16	.111	8	–	24	.250
† Pac-12 Tournament winner Rankings from AP poll

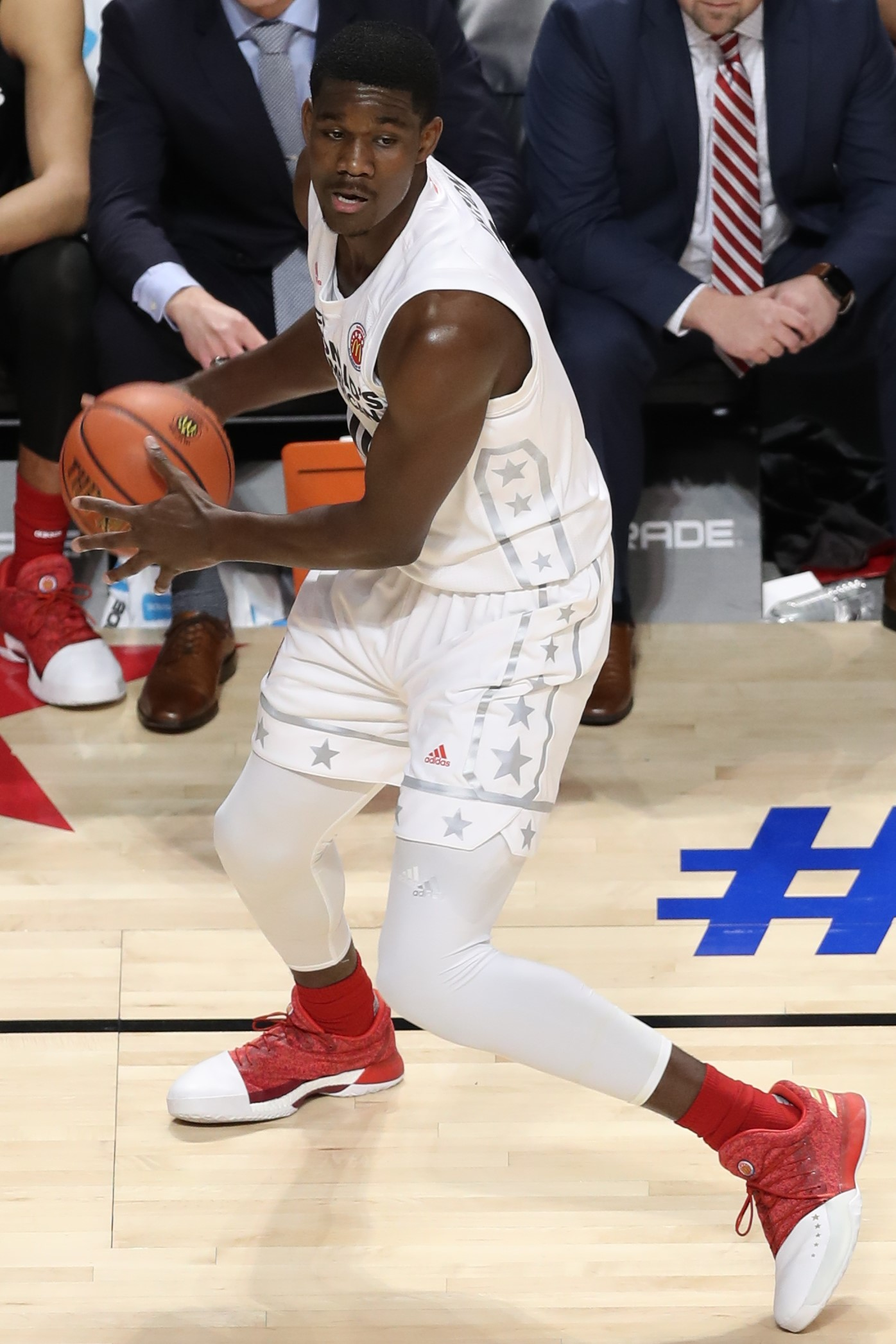
Arizona recruit Deandre Ayton at the 2017 McDonald's All-American Boys Game.

The 2017–18 Arizona Wildcats men's basketball team represented the University of Arizona during the 2017–18 NCAA Division I men's basketball season. The team was led by ninth-year head coach Sean Miller, and played their home games at McKale Center in Tucson, Arizona as members in the Pac-12 Conference. They finished the season 27–8, 14–4 in Pac-12 play to win the regular season championship. They defeated Colorado, UCLA, and USC to win the Pac-12 tournament. As a result, they received the conference's automatic bid to the NCAA tournament where, as a No. 4 seed, they were upset in the first round by No. 13 seed Buffalo.

Due to 2017–18 NCAA Division I men's basketball corruption scandal, 18 wins from this season have been vacated. The following 9 wins against Northern Arizona, UMBC, Cal State Bakersfield, Long Beach State, UNLV, Texas A&M, Utah, Colorado & California would count in the overall record as the player involved in the scandal did not play in these games.

== Previous season ==
Entering the 2016–17 season, Arizona had been ranked in 78 consecutive AP polls and 81-straight Coaches polls. The Wildcats were ranked every week extending their streak to 97 weeks for the AP and 100 weeks for the Coaches poll. The 97 consecutive weeks in the AP poll is currently the second-longest streak in the nation behind Kansas at 161 weeks. Arizona won its first 10 conference games, the best start since the 1997–98 season when they started 16–0. During the season, Arizona was invited and participated in the Armed Forces Classic in Honolulu. Arizona defeated Michigan State. Arizona also defeated Texas A&M in the Lone Star Shootout in Houston. Arizona also defeated Sacred Heart, Northern Colorado and Santa Clara but lost to Butler in the championship game of the Las Vegas Invitational in Paradise, NV.

They finished the season 32–5, 16–2 in Pac-12 play to finish in a first place tie with Oregon. The championship marked the school's 15th Pac-12 regular season championship title. As the No. 2 seed in the Pac-12 tournament, Arizona defeated Colorado, UCLA and Oregon (avenged from 85 to 58 loss on February 4 in Eugene, OR) to win the sixth Pac-12 tournament championship title since 2002. As a result, the Wildcats received the conference's automatic bid to the NCAA tournament for the fifth consecutive year (32nd NCAA tournament appearances). As a No. 2 seed in the West region, they defeated North Dakota 100–82 and Saint Mary's 69–60 to advance to the Sweet Sixteen. However, in the Sweet Sixteen, they lost to No. 11 seed Xavier 73–71.

== Offseason ==
Offseason departures
Name	Position	Year	Hometown	Reason
Kadeem Allen	G	RS Senior	Wilmington, NC	Graduated/2017 NBA draft. Drafted No. 53 overall in the 2nd round to Boston Celtics.
Chance Comanche	C	Sophomore	Beverly Hills, CA	Declared for 2017 NBA draft. Went undrafted.
Paulo Cruz	G	Sophomore	San Diego, CA	Walk-on; Transferred to Cal Poly.
Ray Smith	F	RS Freshman	Las Vegas, NV	Retired from basketball due to multiple injuries
Kobi Simmons	G	Freshman	Atlanta, GA	Declared for the NBA draft. Went undrafted. Signed an undrafted free agent deal with Memphis Grizzlies.
Lauri Markkanen	F	Freshman	Jyväskylä, FI	Declared for 2017 NBA draft. Drafted No. 7th overall in the 1st round to Minnesota Timberwolves and traded to Chicago Bulls.

Incoming transfers
Name	Position	Year	Hometown	Previous School	Remaining Eligibility	Notes
Chase Jeter	F/C	Junior	Las Vegas, NV	Duke	2	Will sit out the 2017–18 season due to NCAA transfer rules.

=== 2017 recruiting class ===
Tempe, Arizona product Alex Barcello was the first commitment in the Arizona class. He committed to Arizona on August 26 at a press conference at his high school. He chose Arizona over Butler, Indiana, Stanford and Virginia. He was a consensus four star prospect, and was ranked the consensus No. 93 overall player by the four main recruiting services.

Deandre Ayton, a Bahamian attending school in Phoenix, was the second commitment in the Arizona class. He committed to Arizona on September 6 live on ESPN. He chose Arizona for an upset over Kansas and Kentucky. He was a consensus five star prospect, and was ranked the consensus No. 2 overall player by the four main recruiting services.

Brandon Randolph, originally from Yonkers, New York, was the third commitment in the Arizona class. He committed to Arizona on October 12. He chose Arizona over Syracuse, Oregon and Wake Forest. He was a consensus top fifty player, ranked No. 42 by the four main recruiting services.

Ira Lee, from Los Angeles, was the fourth commitment in the Arizona class. He committed to Arizona on October 20. He chose Arizona over California and Oregon. He was a consensus top-25 player and ranked as a four-star player by the four main recruiting services Rivals, ESPN, Scout, and 24/7 Sports.

Emmanuel Akot from Winnipeg, CA, was the first commitment in the 2018 Arizona class, but he will reclassified to 2017 class (fifth and final commitment). He committed to Arizona on March 9 at a press conference at his high school. He chose Arizona over Louisville, Oregon and Utah. He was a consensus five star prospect, and was ranked the consensus No. 21 overall player by the four main recruiting services.

Arizona also added Preferred Walk-on Matt Weyand from Mater Dei High School in Santa Ana, California.

College recruiting
Name	Hometown	School	Height	Weight	Commit date
Alex Barcello; PG	Tempe, AZ	Corona del Sol HS	6 ft 2 in (1.88 m)	168 lb (76 kg)	Aug 26, 2016
Alex Barcello; PG	Recruit ratings: Scout: Rivals: 247Sports: ESPN: (83)				
Deandre Ayton; C	Nassau, BS	Hillcrest Prep Academy (AZ)	7 ft 0 in (2.13 m)	241 lb (109 kg)	Sep 6, 2016
Deandre Ayton; C	Recruit ratings: Scout: Rivals: 247Sports: ESPN: (97)				
Brandon Randolph; SG	Yonkers, NY	Westtown School (PA)	6 ft 6 in (1.98 m)	176 lb (80 kg)	Oct 12, 2016
Brandon Randolph; SG	Recruit ratings: Scout: Rivals: 247Sports: ESPN: (89)				
Ira Lee; PF	Los Angeles, CA	Crossroads School	6 ft 7.5 in (2.02 m)	217.5 lb (98.7 kg)	Oct 20, 2016
Ira Lee; PF	Recruit ratings: Scout: Rivals: 247Sports: ESPN: (85)				
Emmanuel Akot; F/G	Winnipeg, MB	Wasatch Academy (UT)	6 ft 7.5 in (2.02 m)	192.5 lb (87.3 kg)	Mar 9, 2017
Emmanuel Akot; F/G	Recruit ratings: Scout: Rivals: 247Sports: ESPN: (88)				
Overall recruit ranking: Scout: #3 Rivals: #3 247Sports: #3 ESPN: #3
Note: In many cases, Scout, Rivals, 247Sports, On3, and ESPN may conflict in their listings of height and weight.; In these cases, the average was taken. ESPN grades are on a 100-point scale.; Sources: "Arizona 2017 Basketball Commitments". Rivals.; "2017 Arizona Basketball Commits". Scout.; "2017 Arizona Wildcats Recruiting Class". ESPN.; "Scout.com Team Recruiting Rankings". Scout.; "2017 Team Ranking". Rivals.; "2017 Arizona 24/7 Sports Commits". 247Sports.

School Offers by Recruit

ESPN 100

- Alex Barcello: Arizona, Butler, Indiana, Stanford and Virginia
- Brandon Randolph: Arizona Syracuse, Oregon and Wake Forest
- Ira Lee: Arizona, California and Oregon
- Deandre Ayton: Arizona, Kansas and Kentucky
- Emmanuel Akot: Arizona, Louisville, Oregon and Utah

== FBI investigation ==
On September 26, federal prosecutors in New York announced charges of fraud and corruption against 10 people involved in college basketball, including Arizona assistant coach Emmanuel "Book" Richardson. The charges allege that Richardson and others allegedly received payments from financial advisers and others to influence student-athletes to retain their services and in turn used those payments to secure recruits. Following the news, Richardson was suspended and relieved of all duties. On January 11, 2018, UA fired assistant basketball coach Book Richardson after his appeal failed.

On February 23, 2018, according to a published report by ESPN, an FBI wiretap revealed that head coach Sean Miller talked with Christian Dawkins (another key figure in the scandal) to discuss paying their top prospect, Deandre Ayton, $100,000 to commit to Arizona, with the monetary situation being dealt with directly with him. While Miller would not coach their next game that day against Oregon, Arizona allowed Ayton to play. Coach Sean Miller subsequently denied the allegation and the University of Arizona announced he will remain the coach of Arizona Wildcats men's basketball team, with Ayton also allowed to continue playing with the team for the rest of the season. However, as a consequence of the report involving Ayton, both of Arizona's remaining committed recruits from the class of 2018, Shareef O'Neal and Brandon Williams, announced they had decommitted.

== Personnel ==
=== Roster ===
2017–18 Arizona Wildcats men's basketball team
Players
Coaches

Pos.	#	Name	Height	Weight	Year	Previous school	Hometown
G	0	Parker Jackson-Cartwright	5 ft 11 in (1.8 m)	170 lb (77 kg)	Sr	Sierra Canyon School	Los Angeles, CA
G	1	Rawle Alkins	6 ft 5 in (1.96 m)	220 lb (100 kg)	So	Word of God Christian	Brooklyn, NY
G	3	Dylan Smith	6 ft 5 in (1.96 m)	170 lb (77 kg)	RS So	UNC Asheville	Mobile, AL
F	4	Chase Jeter (redshirt)	6 ft 10 in (2.08 m)	230 lb (104 kg)	Jr	Duke	Las Vegas, NV
G	5	Brandon Randolph	6 ft 6 in (1.98 m)	175 lb (79 kg)	Fr	Westtown School	Yonkers, NY
F	11	Ira Lee	6 ft 7 in (2.01 m)	235 lb (107 kg)	Fr	Crossroads School	Glendale, AZ
C	13	Deandre Ayton	7 ft 1 in (2.16 m)	250 lb (113 kg)	Fr	Hillcrest Prep	Nassau, Bahamas
C	14	Dušan Ristić	7 ft 0 in (2.13 m)	245 lb (111 kg)	Sr	Sunrise Christian Academy	Novi Sad, Serbia
G	20	Talbott Denny	6 ft 5 in (1.96 m)	215 lb (98 kg)	GS	Lipscomb	Tucson, AZ
G	23	Alex Barcello	6 ft 2 in (1.88 m)	180 lb (82 kg)	Fr	Corona del Sol HS	Chandler, AZ
G	24	Emmanuel Akot	6 ft 7 in (2.01 m)	200 lb (91 kg)	Fr	Wasatch Academy	Winnipeg, MB
F	25	Keanu Pinder	6 ft 10 in (2.08 m)	220 lb (100 kg)	Sr	Hutchinson C.C.	Perth, Australia
G	35	Allonzo Trier	6 ft 5 in (1.96 m)	205 lb (93 kg)	Jr	Findlay Prep	Seattle, WA
G	50	Tyler Trillo (W)	5 ft 11 in (1.8 m)	170 lb (77 kg)	RS Jr	Roger Williams	Southbury, CT
G	52	Kory Jones (injured) (W)	6 ft 3 in (1.91 m)	170 lb (77 kg)	So	Westfield HS	Herndon, VA
G	54	Matt Weyand (W)	6 ft 5 in (1.96 m)	190 lb (86 kg)	Fr	Mater Dei HS	Santa Ana, CA
F	55	Jake DesJardins (W)	6 ft 6 in (1.98 m)	215 lb (98 kg)	So	Coronado HS	Henderson, NV

Head coach

- Sean Miller (Pittsburgh)

Assistant coach(es)

- Lorenzo Romar (Washington)
- Austin Carroll (American)
- Mark Phelps (Old Dominion)

Legend

- (C) Team captain
- (S) Suspended
- (I) Ineligible
- (W) Walk-on
- Injured
- Current redshirt

Roster
Last update: February 2018

- Aug 23, 2017 – Sophomore walk-on Kory Jones will miss the 2017–18 season after tearing his left ACL.
- Sept 27, 2017 – Sophomore Rawle Alkins out 8–12 weeks with a broken right foot.
- Feb 22, 2018 – Junior Allonzo Trier ruled ineligible by NCAA for testing positive of a banned substance.

==== Depth chart ====
Pos.	Starting 5	Bench 1	Bench 2	Bench 3
C	Dušan Ristić	Keanu Pinder
PF	Deandre Ayton	Ira Lee	Jake DesJardins
SF	Rawle Alkins	Brandon Randolph	Emmanuel Akot
SG	Allonzo Trier	Dylan Smith	Matt Weyand	Kory Jones +
PG	P. Jackson-Cartwright	Alex Barcello	Talbott Denny	Tyler Trillo

=== Coaching staff ===
Name	Position	Year at Arizona	Alma Mater (year)
Sean Miller	Head coach	9th	Pittsburgh (1992)
Lorenzo Romar	Associate head coach	1st	Washington (1980)
Mark Phelps	Assistant coach	3rd	Old Dominion (1996)
Ryan Reynolds	Director of Basketball Operations	9th	Xavier (2007)
Austin Carroll	Assistant director of Basketball Operations	2nd	American (2014)

== Preseason ==
=== Summer Exhibition Tour ===
Practices began earlier than otherwise allowed by the NCAA in preparation for a three-game foreign tour to Spain in August. (NCAA rules allow teams to conduct 10 practices in preparation for a foreign tour.) NCAA rules allow for foreign tours once every four years and the Spain tour was Arizona's first since 2012. It was the eighth in program history. The University of Arizona basketball program will travel to Spain in August for a foreign tour, including a trio of exhibition games. The Wildcats will spend time in Barcelona and Valencia Aug. 11 through Aug. 19.

UA will take on Combinado Valenciano on Saturday, Aug. 13 at 7 p.m. local at the Pabellon Municipal Fuente de San Luis in Valencia.

The trip's second exhibition features Arizona and the Mataro All-Stars on Wednesday, August 16 at 7:10 p.m. in Barcelona inside the Pavello Municipal Teresa Maria Roca prior to the final exhibition two days later against Mataro Parc Boet in the same arena.

All three of the exhibitions will be streamed online by FloHoops.com with a subscription required.

=== Red and Blue game ===
The annual Red-Blue game will take place at McKale Center on October 20, 2017. After freshman Brandon Randolph won the dunk contest, the Blue team, led by Deandre Ayton, knocked off the Red team, 55–37.

=== Preseason rankings ===
For the fifth time in the past six seasons, Arizona Wildcats voted 2017-18 Pac-12 preseason favorite by media poll. On October 19, Arizona was pre-season ranked 5th in USA Today coaches preseason poll. On November 1, Arizona was pre-season ranked No. 3 in AP Top 25 preseason poll.

In its preseason college preview, Lindy's Sports ranked the Wildcats No. 2 in the country. The Blue Ribbon Yearbook ranked UA No. 2 in its preseason rankings. Athlon Sports ranked the Wildcats No. 1 in the country. Street & Smith ranked UA No. 1 in the country. KenPom ranked UA No. 3 in the country. NBC Sports ranked the Wildcats No. 3 in the country. CBS Sports ranked No. 2 for the Wildcats. ESPN ranked No. 2 for the Wildcats. Sports Illustrated ranked UA No. 1 in the country.

== Schedule and results ==
On June 8, Arizona released the non-conference schedule is highlighted by marquee match-ups at McKale Center and across the country. Arizona will also host Alabama, Cal State Bakersfield, UConn, Long Beach State, North Dakota State, Northern Arizona and UMBC in Tucson, AZ. Arizona will travel to Phoenix to play Texas A&M at Talking Stick Resort Arena in the annual Valley of the Sun Shootout, to Nassau, Bahamas to play three of the following teams: (NC State, Northern Iowa, Purdue, SMU, Tennessee, Villanova or Western Kentucky) in the Battle 4 Atlantis at Imperial Arena, to Albuquerque to play against New Mexico, and finally face UNLV in Paradise, NV.

The 2018 Pac-12 Tournament will begin March 7 in Las Vegas and conclude on March 10. Selection Sunday occurs the following day.

In the unbalanced 18-game Pac-12 schedule, Arizona will not play the Washington teams (Washington/Washington State) at home and Los Angeles teams (UCLA/USC) on the road.

Date time, TV	Rank^{#}	Opponent^{#}	Result	Record	High points	High rebounds	High assists	Site (attendance) city, state
Spain Exhibition Tour
August 13, 2017*; 10:00 am, FloHoops.com		vs. Combinado Valenciano	W 113–44		21 – Randolph	16 – Ristic	7 – Jackson-Cartwright	Pabellon Municipal Fuente de San Luis; Valencia, ES
August 16, 2017*; 10:10 am, FLOHoops.com		vs. Mataro All-Stars	W 99–74		21 – Trier	10 – Ayton	8 – Trier	Pavello Municipal Teresa Maria Roca; Barcelona, ES
August 18, 2017*; 10:10 am, FLOHoops.com		vs. Mataro Parc Boet	Canceled					Pavello Municipal Teresa Maria Roca; Barcelona, ES
Exhibition
November 1, 2017*; 7:00 pm, P12N	No. 3	Eastern New Mexico	W 91–63	–	31 – Ayton	10 – Ayton	6 – Akot	McKale Center (13,803); Tucson, AZ
November 5, 2017*; 4:00 pm, P12N	No. 3	Chico State	W 91–53	–	22 – Trier	11 – Ayton	6 – Akot	McKale Center (13,865); Tucson, AZ
Non-conference regular season
November 10, 2017*; 6:00 pm, P12N	No. 3	Northern Arizona	W 101–67	1–0	32 – Trier	12 – Ayton	8 – Jackson-Cartwright	McKale Center (14,644); Tucson, AZ
November 12, 2017*; 4:00 pm, P12N	No. 3	UMBC; Battle 4 Atlantis campus-site game	W 103–78	2–0	30 – Trier	13 – Ayton	9 – Jackson-Cartwright	McKale Center (13,496); Tucson, AZ
November 16, 2017*; 8:00 pm, P12N	No. 3	Cal State Bakersfield	W 91–59	3–0	28 – Trier	10 – Ayton	4 – Trier	McKale Center (14,301); Tucson, AZ
November 22, 2017*; 5:00 pm, ESPN3	No. 2	vs. NC State; Battle 4 Atlantis quarterfinals	L 84–90	3–1	27 – Tied	14 – Ayton	5 – Jackson-Cartwright	Imperial Arena (2,850); Nassau, BAH
November 23, 2017*; 7:30 pm, ESPN3	No. 2	vs. SMU; Battle 4 Atlantis 2nd round consolation	L 60–66	3–2	17 – Ayton	15 – Ayton	3 – Tied	Imperial Arena (1,236); Nassau, BAH
November 24, 2017*; 7:30 pm, ESPN3	No. 2	vs. No. 18 Purdue; Battle 4 Atlantis 7th place game	L 64–89	3–3	22 – Ayton	8 – Ayton	7 – Jackson-Cartwright	Imperial Arena (2,298); Nassau, BAH
November 29, 2017*; 6:00 pm, P12N		Long Beach State	W 91–56	4–3	15 – Trier	9 – Tied	5 – Jackson-Cartwright	McKale Center (13,626); Tucson, AZ
December 2, 2017*; 8:00 pm, CBSSN		at UNLV	W 91–88 ^{OT}	5–3	29 – Trier	10 – Ayton	3 – Tied	Thomas & Mack Center (14,579); Paradise, NV
December 5, 2017*; 7:00 pm, ESPN2		vs. No. 7 Texas A&M; Valley of the Sun Shootout	W 67–64	6–3	13 – 4 tied	10 – Ayton	4 – Barcello	Talking Stick Resort Arena (8,907); Phoenix, AZ
December 9, 2017*; 8:00 pm, ESPN2		Alabama	W 88–82	7–3	29 – Ayton	18 – Ayton	6 – Trier	McKale Center (14,644); Tucson, AZ
December 16, 2017*; 6:00 pm, CBSSN	No. 23	at New Mexico	W 89–73	8–3	26 – Alkins	13 – Ayton	5 – Tied	The Pit (13,207); Albuquerque, NM
December 18, 2017*; 7:00 pm, P12N	No. 18-t	North Dakota State	W 83–53	9–3	25 – Ayton	9 – Ayton	4 – Trier	McKale Center (14,048); Tucson, AZ
December 21, 2017*; 7:00 pm, ESPN2	No. 18-t	UConn	W 73–58	10–3	20 – Alkins	9 – Ristic	5 – Ayton	McKale Center (14,392); Tucson, AZ
Pac-12 regular season
December 30, 2017; 7:00 pm, P12N	No. 17	No. 3 Arizona State; Rivalry	W 84–78	11–3 (1–0)	23 – Ayton	19 – Ayton	6 – Jackson-Cartwright	McKale Center (14,644); Tucson, AZ
January 4, 2018; 7:00 pm, ESPN	No. 14	at Utah	W 94–82	12–3 (2–0)	24 – Ayton	14 – Ayton	5 – Trier	Jon M. Huntsman Center (13,543); Salt Lake City, UT
January 6, 2018; 12:00 pm, P12N	No. 14	at Colorado	L 77–80	12–4 (2–1)	26 – Ayton	11 – Ristic	8 – Jackson-Cartwright	Coors Events Center (8,519); Boulder, CO
January 11, 2018; 7:00 pm, P12N	No. 17	Oregon State	W 62–53	13–4 (3–1)	21 – Trier	10 – Ayton	5 – Jackson-Cartwright	McKale Center (14,644); Tucson, AZ
January 13, 2018; 12:00 pm, ESPN2	No. 17	Oregon	W 90–83	14–4 (4–1)	25 – Trier	7 – Ayton	6 – Alkins	McKale Center (14,644); Tucson, AZ
January 17, 2018; 7:00 pm, P12N	No. 14	at California	W 79–58	15–4 (5–1)	20 – Ayton	11 – Ayton	6 – Jackson-Cartwright	Haas Pavilion (7,721); Berkeley, CA
January 20, 2018; 2:00 pm, CBS	No. 14	at Stanford	W 73–71	16–4 (6–1)	21 – Trier	9 – Ristic	5 – Tied	Maples Pavilion (6,079); Stanford, CA
January 25, 2018; 6:30 pm, FS1	No. 11	Colorado	W 80–71	17–4 (7–1)	23 – Trier	8 – Ristic	4 – Jackson-Cartwright	McKale Center (14,644); Tucson, AZ
January 27, 2018; 3:30 pm, FOX	No. 11	Utah	W 74–73	18–4 (8–1)	23 – Ristic	8 – Ayton	6 – Jackson-Cartwright	McKale Center (14,644); Tucson, AZ
January 31, 2018; 8:00 pm, P12N	No. 9	at Washington State	W 100–72	19–4 (9–1)	25 – Ayton	11 – Ayton	4 – Jackson-Cartwright	Beasley Coliseum (4,607); Pullman, WA
February 3, 2018; 8:30 pm, P12N	No. 9	at Washington	L 75–78	19–5 (9–2)	21 – Ristic	12 – Ayton	5 – Jackson-Cartwright	Alaska Airlines Arena (10,000); Seattle, WA
February 8, 2018; 8:00 pm, ESPN	No. 13	UCLA; Rivalry	L 74–82	19–6 (9–3)	17 – Trier	12 – Ayton	4 – Jackson-Cartwright	McKale Center (14,644); Tucson, AZ
February 10, 2018; 8:15 PM, ESPN	No. 13	USC	W 81–67	20–6 (10–3)	20 – Alkins	11 – Ristic	5 – Alkins	McKale Center (14,644); Tucson, AZ
February 15, 2018; 7:00 pm, ESPN	No. 17	at No. 25 Arizona State; Rivalry	W 77–70	21–6 (11–3)	25 – Ayton	16 – Ayton	5 – Trier	Wells Fargo Arena (14,233); Tempe, AZ
February 22, 2018; 7:00 pm, FS1	No. 14	at Oregon State	W 75–65 ^{OT}	22–6 (12–3)	19 – Ayton	12 – Ayton	4 – Ayton	Gill Coliseum (4,963); Corvallis, OR
February 24, 2018; 8:15 pm, ESPN	No. 14	at Oregon	L 93–98 ^{OT}	22–7 (12–4)	28 – Ayton	18 – Ayton	5 – Tied	Matthew Knight Arena (12,364); Eugene, OR
March 1, 2018; 8:00 pm, FS1	No. 19	Stanford	W 75–67	23–7 (13–4)	21 – Ristic	10 – Ayton	4 – 3 tied	McKale Center (14,644); Tucson, AZ
March 3, 2018; 4:30 pm, P12N	No. 19	California	W 66–54	24–7 (14–4)	26 – Ayton	20 – Ayton	7 – Trier	McKale Center (14,644); Tucson, AZ
Pac-12 Tournament
March 8, 2018; 1:00 pm, P12N	(1) No. 15	vs. (8) Colorado; Quarterfinals	W 83–67	25–7	22 – Trier	11 – Ristic	4 – Jackson-Cartwright	T-Mobile Arena (15,182); Paradise, NV
March 9, 2018; 7:00 pm, P12N	(1) No. 15	vs. (4) UCLA; Semifinals/Rivalry	W 78–67 ^{OT}	26–7	32 – Ayton	14 – Ayton	4 – Jackson-Cartwright	T-Mobile Arena (16,596); Paradise, NV
March 10, 2018; 8:00 pm, FS1	(1) No. 15	vs. (2) USC; Championship	W 75–61	27–7	32 – Ayton	18 – Ayton	5 – Jackson-Cartwright	T-Mobile Arena (16,501); Paradise, NV
NCAA tournament
March 15, 2018*; 6:40 pm, CBS	(4 S) No. 12	vs. (13 S) Buffalo; First Round	L 68–89	27–8	16 – Ristic	13 – Ayton	5 – Alkins	Taco Bell Arena (11,673); Boise, ID
*Non-conference game. ^{#}Rankings from AP Poll. (#) Tournament seedings in parentheses. S=South. All times are in Mountain Time.

Schedule Source: ArizonaWildcats.com

== Ranking movement ==
	Pre	Wk 2	Wk 3	Wk 4	Wk 5	Wk 6	Wk 7	Wk 8	Wk 9	Wk 10	Wk 11	Wk 12	Wk 13	Wk 14	Wk 15	Wk 16	Wk 17	Wk 18	Final
Arizona	3 (18)	3 (16)	2 (11)	RV	RV	23	18T	17	14	17	14	11	9	13	17	14	19	15	12

	Pre	Wk 3	Wk 4	Wk 5	Wk 6	Wk 7	Wk 8	Wk 9	Wk 10	Wk 11	Wk 12	Wk 13	Wk 14	Wk 15	Wk 16	Wk 17	Wk 18	Final	Postseason (final)
Arizona	5 (2)	4	RV	RV	23	19	18	16	21	17	12	9	13	19	14	22	17	15	RV

- Number in italic indicates the number of first place votes

^Coaches did not release a Week 2 poll.
*AP does not release post-NCAA Tournament rankings

== Player statistics ==
Individual player statistics (Final)
			Minutes		Scoring		Total FGs			3-point FGs			Free-Throws			Rebounds							
Player	GP	GS	Tot	Avg	Pts	Avg	FG	FGA	Pct	3FG	3FA	Pct	FT	FTA	Pct	Off	Def	Tot	Avg	A	TO	Stl	Blk
Alex Barcello	16	0	187	11.7	46	2.9	16	44	.364	8	26	.308	6	8	.750	3	17	20	1.3	19	8	3	0
Allonzo Trier	26	26	878	33.8	509	19.6	159	293	.543	61	144	.424	130	153	.850	11	73	84	3.2	81	59	16	11
Brandon Randolph	25	4	323	12.9	109	4.4	38	101	.376	14	44	.318	19	26	.731	4	20	24	1.0	25	19	12	4
Deandre Ayton	26	26	841	32.3	509	19.5	200	331	.604	10	29	.318	96	130	.738	71	207	278	10.7	36	45	12	47
Dušan Ristić	26	26	658	25.3	308	11.8	128	216	.593	3	8	.375	49	61	.803	56	127	183	7.0	26	31	9	15
Dylan Smith	25	6	384	15.4	116	4.6	39	104	.375	25	69	.362	13	15	.867	8	32	40	1.6	31	24	4	5
Emmanuel Akot	22	4	218	9.9	39	1.8	15	39	.385	8	19	.421	1	5	.200	8	18	26	1.2	20	14	4	3
Ira Lee	25	0	273	10.9	60	2.4	23	51	.451	1	2	.500	13	23	.565	19	41	60	2.4	10	12	5	11
Jake DesJardins	3	0	7	2.3	2	0.7	1	2	.500	0	2	.000	0	0	.000	0	3	3	1.0	1	1	0	0
Keanu Pinder	23	0	220	9.6	49	2.1	18	27	.667	0	0	.000	13	21	.619	10	37	47	2.0	1	12	7	12
Matt Weyand	0	0	0	0.0	0	0.0	0	0	.000	0	0	.000	0	0	.000	0	0	0	0.0	0	0	0	0
Parker Jackson-Cartwright	26	26	810	31.2	190	7.3	62	144	.431	36	81	.444	30	41	.732	5	51	56	2.2	127	43	37	3
Rawle Alkins	14	12	415	29.6	191	13.6	63	136	.463	23	59	.390	42	56	.750	25	33	58	4.1	39	35	18	11
Talbott Denny	2	0	5	2.5	0	0.0	0	0	.000	0	0	.000	0	0	.000	0	0	0	0.0	0	1	0	0
Tyler Trillo	1	0	5	5.0	3	3.0	1	1	1.000	1	1	1.000	0	0	.000	0	0	0	0.0	0	1	0	0
Total	26	-	-	-	2128	82	763	1489	.512	190	482	.394	412	539	.764	251	681	932	36	417	313	127	122
Opponents																							

Legend
GP	Games played	GS	Games started	Avg	Average per game
FG	Field-goals made	FGA	Field-goal attempts	Off	Offensive rebounds
Def	Defensive rebounds	A	Assists	TO	Turnovers
Blk	Blocks	Stl	Steals	High	Team high

== Awards and honors ==
=== Weekly awards ===
- Allonzo Trier
  - Week 1, Pac-12 Player of the Week (Nov. 13)
  - NBC Sports Player of the Week (Nov. 13)
- Deandre Ayton
  - Week 4, Pac–12 Player of the Week (Dec. 4)
  - Wayman Tisdale National Freshman of the Week (Dec 10)
  - Wayman Tisdale National Freshman of the Week (2) (Feb 25)
  - NCAA Men's Player of the Week (Jan. 1)
  - NBC Sports Player of the Week (Jan. 1)
  - Pac-12 Player of the Week (2) (Jan. 2)
- Dusan Ristic
  - Pac-12 Player of the Week (Jan. 29)

=== Watchlists ===
- Allonzo Trier

Jerry West Award Preseason Watch List (2018)
Oscar Robertson Award Preseason Watch List (2018)
Lute Olson Award Preseason Watch List (2018)
Naismith Trophy Award Preseason Watch List (2018)
John R. Wooden Award Preseason Watch List (2018)
John R. Wooden Award Midseason Top 25 (2018)

- Rawle Alkins

Julius Erving Award Preseason Watch List (2018)
Naismith Trophy Award Preseason Watch List (2018)
John R. Wooden Award Preseason Watch List (2018)

- Deandre Ayton

Karl Malone Award Preseason Watch List (2018)
Oscar Robertson Award Preseason Watch List (2018)
Naismith Trophy Award Preseason Watch List (2018)
John R. Wooden Award Preseason Watch List (2018)
John R. Wooden Award Midseason Top 25 (2018)
Oscar Robertson Trophy Midseason Watch List (2018)
Karl Malone Award Finalist (2018)
Naismith Trophy Award Finalist (2018)

- Dušan Ristić

Kareem Abdul-Jabbar Award Preseason Watch List (2018)

=== Pac-12 awards ===
- Deandre Ayton

Pac-12 Tournament Most Outstanding Player (2018)
Pac-12 Player of the Year (2018)
Pac-12 Freshman Player of the Year (2018)

=== National district awards ===
- Deandre Ayton

USBWA District IX Player of the Year (2018)

=== All-American and national awards ===
- Allonzo Trier

AP Pac-12 First Team All-American (2018)
AP Preseason First Team All-American (2017)
Street & Smith Preseason Second Team All-American (2017)
NBC Sports Preseason First Team All-American (2017)
ESPN Preseason First Team All-American (2017)
Sports Illustrated Preseason First Team All-American (2017)
USA Today Preseason First Team All-American (2017)
Blue Ribbon Preseason Second Team All-American (2017)
Athlon Sports Preseason Second Team All-American (2017)
Sporting News Preseason Second Team All-American (2017)
USBWA District IX All-District Team (2018)
NABC District 20 Second Team (2018)
AP All-American Honorable mention (2018)

- Deandre Ayton

Karl Malone Power Forward of the Year Award (2018)
AP Pac-12 Player of the Year (2018)
AP Pac-12 Newcomer of the Year (2018)
AP Pac-12 First Team All-American (2018)
NBC Sports First Team All-American (2018)
AP Preseason Second Team All-American (2017)
NBC Sports Preseason Third Team All-American (2017)
Blue Ribbon Preseason Third Team All-American (2017)
Athlon Sports Preseason Third Team All-American (2017)
Sporting News Preseason Third Team All-American (2017)
Sports Illustrated Preseason Honorable Mention All-American (2017)
USA Today Preseason Honorable Mention All-American (2017)
USA Today First Team All-American (2018)
Sporting News First Team All-American (2018)
USBWA District IX All-District Team (2018)
USBWA First Team All-American (2018)
NABC First Team All-American (2018)
NABC District 20 First team (2018)
AP First Team All-American (2018)

==== All-Pac-12 team ====
- Deandre Ayton

All Pac-12 First team (2018)
All Pac-12 Freshman team (2018)
All Pac-12 Defensive team (2018)

- Allonzo Trier

All Pac-12 First team (2018)

- Dusan Ristic

All Pac-12 Second team (2018)

- Rawle Alkins

All Pac-12 Honorable mention (2018)

==== All-Pac-12 tournament team ====
- Deandre Ayton

All Pac-12 tournament team (2018)

- Dusan Ristic

All Pac-12 tournament team (2018)

== See also ==
2017–18 Arizona Wildcats women's basketball team
