= Kildonan-East Collegiate =

Kildonan East Collegiate
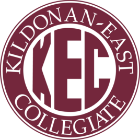

Location
- 845 Concordia Avenue; Winnipeg, Manitoba, R2M 3K3; Canada; 49.9171°N 97.0756°W

Information
- School type: Public, Secondary School
- Motto: Reiver Nation
- Established: c.1971
- School board: River East Transcona School Division
- Superintendent: Sandra Herbst
- Principal: Marjorie Millman
- Grades: Grades 9-12
- Enrollment: 1356 (2024)
- Language: English
- Colours: Maroon and Silver
- Team name: Kildonan East Reivers
- Website: School Website

Kildonan East Collegiate is a grade 9 to 12 Public high school in Winnipeg, Manitoba, Canada with an enrolment of 1300 students. It is a part of the River East Transcona School Division.

Built in 1971, Kildonan East Collegiate is a vocational school with various courses from grades 9 to 12.

== History ==
In 1971, the school opened and was initially named Kildonan East Regional Secondary School. In 1987, the school was renamed to Kildonan East Collegiate. When the school opened in September 1971, it had an enrolment of 651 students. It increased to 1600 students in 1979.

In 2014, the schools second floor bathroom was deliberately set on fire causing approximately $500,000 in damages.

In 2016, a former student was arrested after posting a video to YouTube threatening the school.

In 2019, Kildonan East Collegiate created an Indigenous outdoor learning space that included a 20-foot teepee, a traditional learning circle and an Indigenous medicine garden. A ceremony to commemorate this the building of this learning place took place after it was built.

== Notable alumni ==
- Emmanuel Akot, former college basketball player, Reivers Basketball alumni
- Randy Ambrosie, CFL Commissioner
