= Kurt Kanaskie =

American college basketball coach (born 1958)

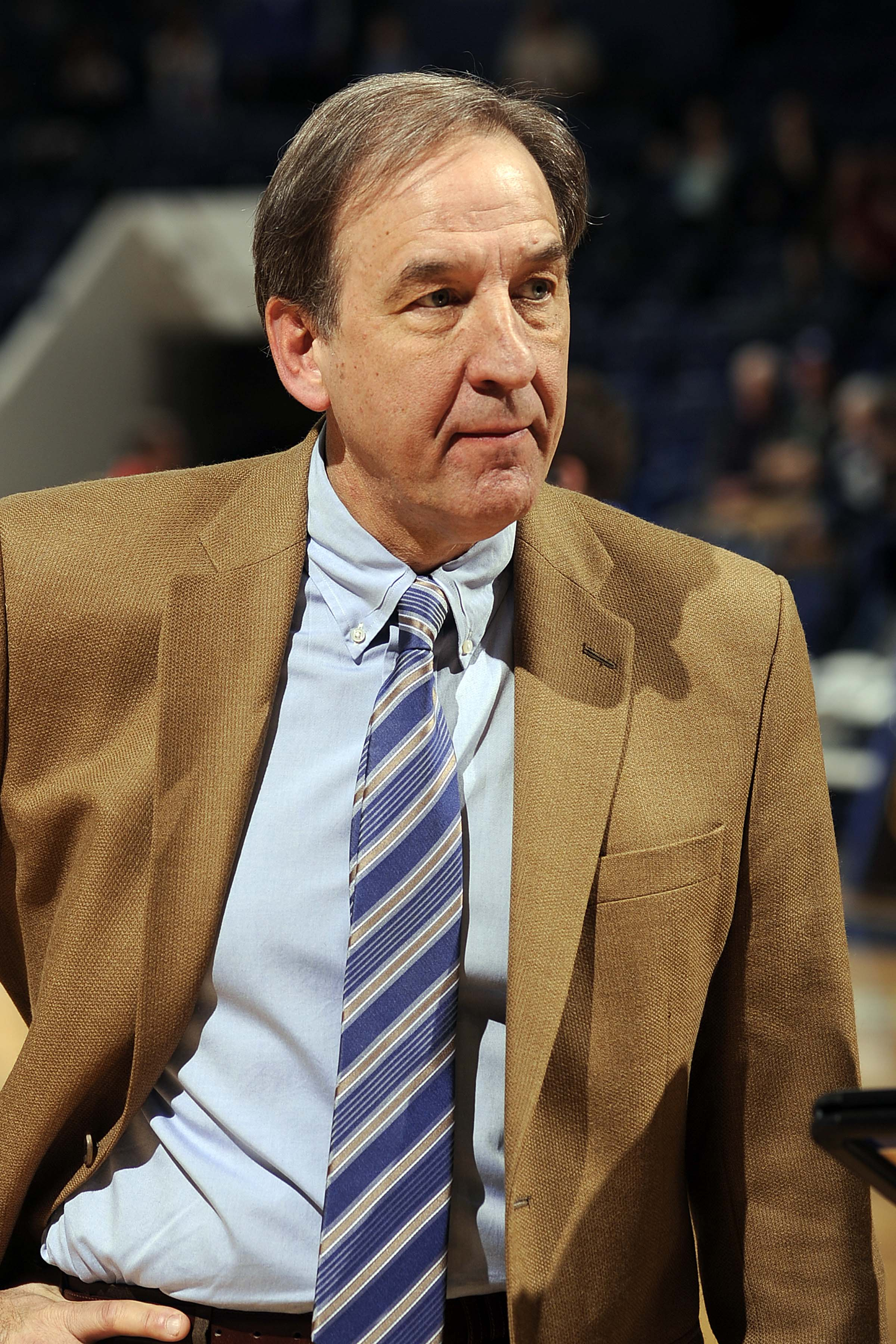
- Kanaskie in 2016.

Current position
- Title: Associate head coach
- Team: UNC Wilmington
- Conference: CAA

Biographical details
- Born: April 14, 1958 (age 68); Enola, Pennsylvania, U.S.

Playing career
- 1976–1980: La Salle
- Position: Guard

Coaching career (HC unless noted)
- 1980–1985: South Carolina (asst.)
- 1985–1988: Lock Haven
- 1988–1996: IUP
- 1996–2003: Drake
- 2003–2009: Penn State (asst.)
- 2009–2011: Penn State (assoc. HC)
- 2011–2012: Navy (assoc. HC)
- 2012–2014: Virginia Tech (asst.)
- 2014–2020: Air Force (asst.)
- 2020–2022: UNC Wilmington (asst.)
- 2022–present: UNC Wilmington (assoc. HC)

Head coaching record
- Overall: 269–243
- Tournaments: 7–4 (NCAA D-II)

Kurt Michael Kanaskie (born April 14, 1958) is an American college basketball coach who is currently the associate head coach for men's basketball at UNC Wilmington. Previously, Kanaskie was head coach positions at Lock Haven, IUP, and Drake.

== Early life and education ==
Born in Enola, Pennsylvania, Kanaskie grew up in nearby Mechanicsburg and attended Cumberland Valley High School, in which he was an all-state basketball player. Kanaskie later attended La Salle College (now La Salle University) and played basketball for the La Salle Explorers under head coach Paul Westhead from 1976 to 1980. As a senior in 1979–80, Kanaskie averaged 14.5 points and 2.7 rebounds and helped La Salle win the ECC Tournament and make the 1980 NCAA tournament. Kanaskie graduated from La Salle in 1980 with a Bachelor of Science in business administration.

== Coaching career ==
In the 1980 NBA draft, the Golden State Warriors selected Kanaskie as the second pick in the eighth round, 162nd overall. That year, Kanaskie became a college basketball assistant coach at South Carolina under Bill Foster. After five years in that position, Kanaskie served as head coach at Division II Lock Haven University from 1985 to 1988. Inheriting a program that won only 18 games in the past four seasons, Kanaskie led Lock Haven to 15 wins in his first season and ended with a 55–32 overall record. The Pennsylvania State Athletic Conference (PSAC) named Kanaskie its Coach of the Year for the West Division in 1987 and 1988 and co-Coach of the Year in the conference in 1987.

In 1988, Kanaskie became head coach at Indiana University of Pennsylvania (IUP), another PSAC school. In eight seasons at IUP, Kanaskie had a 152–75 record after inheriting a program with four straight losing seasons. Kanaskie led IUP to its first-ever NCAA tournament in 1994 and earned two more West Division PSAC Coach of the Year honors in 1994 and 1995.

Kanaskie moved up to the Division I level as head coach at Drake University, a position he held from 1996 to 2003. When he began the job, Drake was under NCAA probation and had few returning scholarship players. Drake won only five games in Kanaskie's first two seasons but improved to 12–16 (8–10 Missouri Valley Conference) in 2000–01. Kanaskie received a five-year contract extension after that season but still did not deliver a winning season. Days after the 2002–03 season, both Kanaskie's lawyer and the Drake athletic director indicated that Kanaskie would keep his job. However, Kanaskie resigned on April 11, 2003, ending his tenure at Drake with an overall 62–136 record.

Kanaskie returned to being an assistant coach in 2003 at Penn State under Ed DeChellis. In 2009, DeChellis promoted Kanaskie to associate head coach. When DeChellis became head coach at Navy in 2011, Kanaskie followed and also became associate head coach.

After one year at Navy, Kanaskie became assistant coach at Virginia Tech under James Johnson in 2012. Johnson was fired after two seasons. Kanaskie moved to Air Force as assistant coach under Dave Pilipovich in 2014.

On April 6, 2020, Kanaskie was hired as an assistant coach under Takayo Siddle at UNCW. Prior to the 2022-23 season, Kanaskie was promoted to Associate Head Coach.

== Head coaching record ==
Record table
Season	Team	Overall	Conference	Standing	Postseason
Lock Haven Bald Eagles (Pennsylvania State Athletic Conference) (1985–1988)
1985–86	Lock Haven	15–12	5–5	T–3rd (West)	
1986–87	Lock Haven	20–7	8–2	T–1st (West)	NCAA D-II Regional Third Place
1987–88	Lock Haven	18–11	10–2	2nd (West)	
Lock Haven:		55–32	23–9		
IUP Crimson Hawks (Pennsylvania State Athletic Conference) (1988–1996)
1988–89	IUP	10–17	1–11	7th (West)	
1989–90	IUP	14–13	4–8	5th (West)	
1990–91	IUP	15–12	3–9	6th (West)	
1991–92	IUP	15–12	6–6	3rd (West)	
1992–93	IUP	18–9	8–4	2nd (West)	
1993–94	IUP	27–3	11–1	1st (West)	NCAA D-II Quarterfinals
1994–95	IUP	29–2	11–1	1st (West)	NCAA D-II Semifinals
1995–96	IUP	24–7	9–3	2nd (West)	NCAA D-II Regional Finals
IUP:		152–75	53–43		
Drake Bulldogs (Missouri Valley Conference) (1996–2003)
1996–97	Drake	2–26	0–18	10th	
1997–98	Drake	3–24	0–18	10th	
1998–99	Drake	10–17	5–13	10th	
1999–2000	Drake	11–18	4–14	10th	
2000–01	Drake	12–16	8–10	T–7th	
2001–02	Drake	14–15	9–9	T–5th	
2002–03	Drake	10–20	5–13	T–8th	
Drake:		62–136	31–95		
Total:		269–243			
National champion Postseason invitational champion Conference regular season champion Conference regular season and conference tournament champion Division regular season champion Division regular season and conference tournament champion Conference tournament champion
