= Evan O. Williams =

American football and basketball coach (1889–1946)

- Williams pictured in The Quax 1934, Drake Yearbook

Biographical details
- Born: September 26, 1889; Bristol Township, Minnesota, U.S.
- Died: December 21, 1946 (aged 57); Des Moines, Iowa, U.S.

Playing career

Football
- c. 1908: Carleton

Basketball
- c. 1908: Carleton

Baseball
- c. 1908: Carleton

Coaching career (HC unless noted)

Football
- 1915: Huron
- 1919–1931: South HS (MN)
- 1932: Drake

Basketball
- 1915–?: Huron
- 1919–1932: South HS (MN)
- 1932–1943: Drake

Administrative career (AD unless noted)
- 1932–1940: Drake

Head coaching record
- Overall: 2–6–1 (college football, Drake only); 113–115 (college basketball, Drake only)

Evan Owen "Bill" Williams (September 26, 1889 – December 21, 1946) was an American football and basketball coach. He served as the head football coach at Huron University in Huron, South Dakota for one season, 1915, and Drake University in Des Moines, Iowa for one season, in 1932 season. Williams was also the head basketball coach at Drake from 1932 to 1943, compiling a record of 113–115. He was the athletic director at Drake from 1932 to 1940.

During World War II, Williams served as recreation field director with the Red Cross in the South West Pacific theatre. He returned to Des Moines the spring of 1946, and worked an automobile salesman. Williams committed suicide by hanging, on December 22, 1946, at Hotel Kirkwood in Des Moines.

== Head coaching record ==
=== College football ===
Year	Team	Overall	Conference	Standing	Bowl/playoffs
Drake Bulldogs (Missouri Valley Conference) (1932)
1932	Drake	2–6–1	1–3–1	5th	
Drake:		2–6–1	1–3–1		
Total:		2–6–1			

=== College basketball ===
Tenure	Team	Years	Record	Pct.
1932–1943	Drake	11	113–115	.496
