= Emmanuel Akot =

Canadian-South Sudanese basketball player (born 1999)

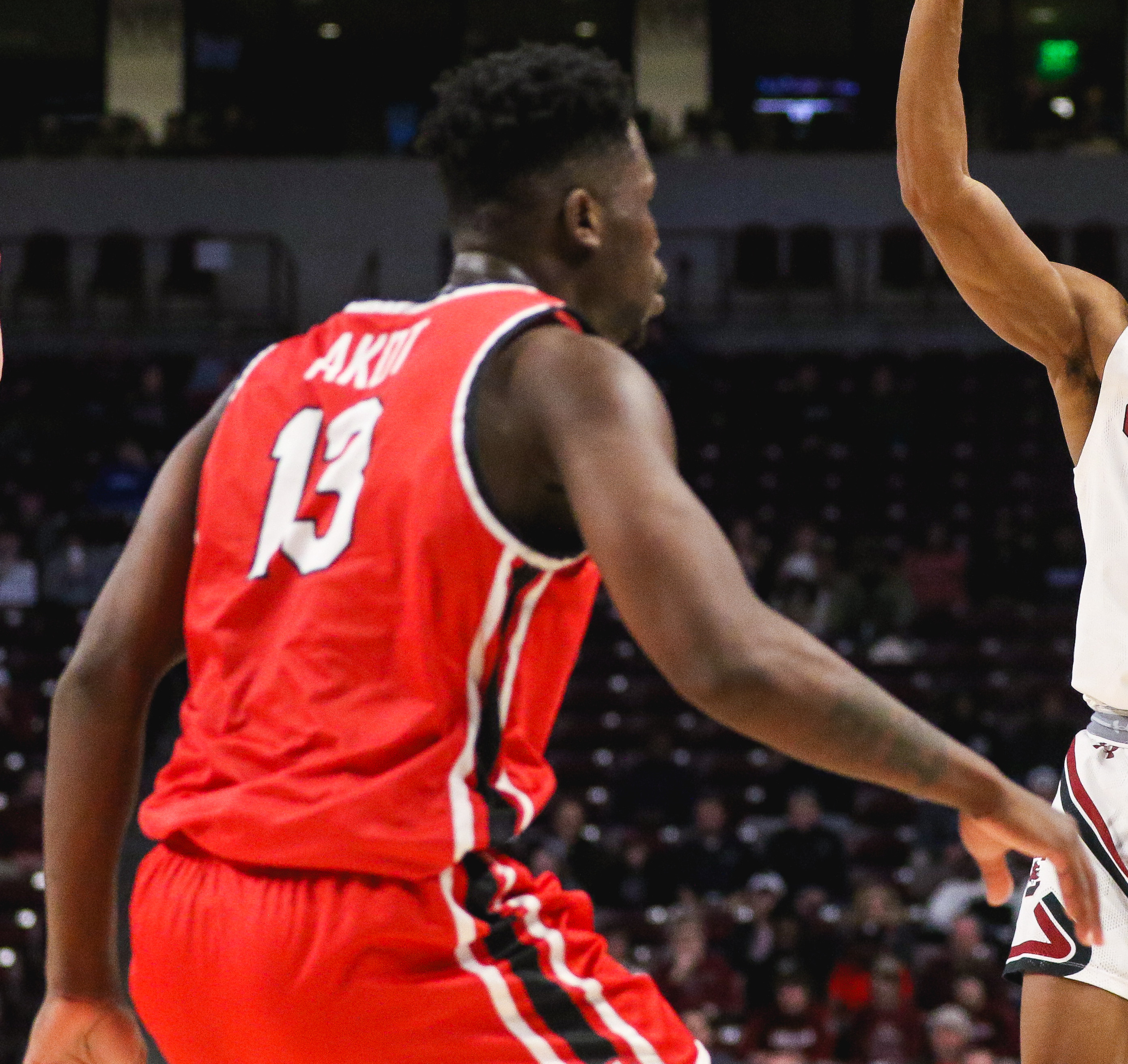
- Akot in 2022 with Western Kentucky

No. 7 – Calor de Cancún
- Position: Power forward / small forward
- League: LNBP

Personal information
- Born: March 17, 1999 (age 27) Calgary, Alberta
- Listed height: 6 ft 8 in (2.03 m)
- Listed weight: 215 lb (98 kg)

Career information
- High school: Kildonan-East Collegiate (Winnipeg, Manitoba); Wasatch Academy (Mount Pleasant, Utah)
- College: Arizona (2017–2019); Boise State (2020–2022); Western Kentucky (2022–2023)
- NBA draft: 2023: undrafted
- Playing career: 2023–present

Career history
- 2023: Ottawa BlackJacks
- 2023–2024: Heroes Den Bosch
- 2024: Anwil Włocławek
- 2024–2026: Winnipeg Sea Bears
- 2026–present: El Calor de Cancún

Career highlights
- CEBL champion (2026)

Emmanuel Akot (born March 17, 1999) is a Canadian-South Sudanese professional basketball player for El Calor de Cancún of the Mexican Liga Nacional de Baloncesto Profesional (LNBP). He played college basketball for the Western Kentucky Hilltoppers, Arizona Wildcats and the Boise State Broncos.

== High school career ==
Akot played for Kildonan-East Collegiate in Winnipeg, Manitoba, up until his sophomore season. While in Kansas for a tournament, Akot received an offer from Wasatch Academy. As a senior at Wasatch Academy, Akot averaged 17 points, seven rebounds and two assists per game. Akot was considered a five-star recruit by 247Sports and Rivals, and a four-star recruit by ESPN. In March 2017, Akot committed to playing college basketball for Arizona. He also received offers from Louisville, Oregon and Utah.

== College career ==
As a freshman for Arizona, Akot played 31 games with four starts. He averaged 1.8 points and 1.1 rebounds per game of his freshman season. He continued his college career with Arizona for his sophomore season and averaged 3.8 points and 2.8 rebounds per game. Akot opted to transfer from Arizona forcing him to sit out the entirety of the 2019–20 season. In 2020, Akot transferred to Boise State. In his two seasons with the Broncos, Akot played in 54 games, starting 39 of them, while averaging 10.0 points and 3.3 rebounds per game. After playing 2 seasons for Boise State, Akot opted to transfer once again, this time to Memphis. However, Memphis would lose Akot, as he would instead transfer to Western Kentucky.

== Professional career ==
=== Ottawa BlackJacks (2023) ===
After going undrafted in the 2023 NBA draft, Akot signed his first professional contract with the Ottawa BlackJacks of the Canadian Elite Basketball League, as a mid-season addition to the roster.

=== Heroes Den Bosch (2023–2024) ===
On August 22, 2023, Dutch basketball club Heroes Den Bosch announced they had signed Akot for the upcoming season.

=== Winnipeg Sea Bears (2024–Present) ===
On May 28, 2024, Akot signed with the Winnipeg Sea Bears of the Canadian Elite Basketball League.

=== Anwil Włocławek (2024) ===
On August 16, 2024, Akot signed with Anwil Włocławek of the Polish Basketball League (PLK). He left the team in October.

== Career statistics ==
Legend
GP	Games played	GS	Games started	MPG	Minutes per game
FG%	Field goal percentage	3P%	3-point field goal percentage	FT%	Free throw percentage
RPG	Rebounds per game	APG	Assists per game	SPG	Steals per game
BPG	Blocks per game	PPG	Points per game	**Bold**	Career high

=== College ===
Year	Team	GP	GS	MPG	FG%	3P%	FT%	RPG	APG	SPG	BPG	PPG
2017–18	Arizona	**31**	4	10.4	.389	.375	.455	1.1	.8	.2	.1	1.8
2018–19	Arizona	17	11	19.3	.394	.286	.400	2.8	1.1	.2	.1	3.8
2019–20	Boise State	Redshirt										
2020–21	Boise State	23	10	25.5	.389	.333	.633	3.6	2.7	**.8**	**.5**	9.1
2021–22	Boise State	**31**	29	**31.8**	.400	**.387**	.590	3.1	**2.8**	.7	.4	**10.6**
2022–23	Western Kentucky	**31**	**31**	29.5	**.407**	.321	**.708**	**3.7**	2.1	.5	.2	10.0
Career		133	85	23.6	.399	.350	.615	2.8	2.0	.5	.3	7.3
