= Charles Pell =

American college sports coach, administrator (1874–1936)

- Pell pictured in The Quax (1903), Drake University yearbook

Biographical details
- Born: October 1, 1874 near Prairie City, Iowa, U.S.
- Died: January 26, 1936 (aged 61); Sedro-Woolley, Washington, U.S.

Playing career

Football
- 1898–1901: Drake

Track and field
- 1899–1902: Drake
- Positions: Fullback, left guard (football)

Coaching career (HC unless noted)

Football
- 1902–1905: Iowa State Normal
- 1906–1907: Drake

Basketball
- 1903–1906: Iowa State Normal
- 1906–1909: Drake

Baseball
- 1906: Iowa State Normal

Administrative career (AD unless noted)
- 1906–1908: Drake

Head coaching record
- Overall: 20–23–7 (football); 17–24 (basketball); 1–7 (baseball)

Charles Albert "Doc" Pell (October 1, 1874 – January 26, 1936) was an American college sports coach and athletics administrator. He served as the head football coach at Iowa State Normal School—now known as the University of Northern Iowa—from 1902 to 1905 and Drake University from 1906 to 1907, compiling a career college football head coaching record of 20–23–7.

== Early life and playing career ==
Pell was born in 1874, near Prairie City, Iowa. He later moved with his family to Dexter, Iowa, where attended public school. Pell entered Drake University, in Des Moines, Iowa, in 1898. There he played on the football team from 1898 to 1901 as a fullback and a left guard. Pell also competed in track and field at Drake from 1899 to 1902, captaining the team in his final year.

== Coaching career ==
In 1906, Pell returned to Drake when he was appointed to succeed W. J. Monilaw as athletic director and Willie Heston as head football coach. He resigned from his position at Drake two years later, at the end of the track season in the spring of 1908.

== Later life and death ==
Pell was later a well-known orchardist in Washington state. He died of pneumonia, on January 26, 1936.

== Head coaching record ==
=== Football ===
Year	Team	Overall	Conference	Standing	Bowl/playoffs
Iowa State Normal (Independent) (1902–1905)
1902	Iowa State Normal	1–6–1			
1903	Iowa State Normal	4–3–1			
1904	Iowa State Normal	5–3–1			
1905	Iowa State Normal	5–3–2			
Iowa State Normal:		15–15–4			
Drake Bulldogs (Independent) (1906–1907)
1906	Drake	2–4–1			
1907	Drake	3–4–1			
Drake:		5–8–2			
Total:		20–23–7			
