= Mark Phelps =

American basketball player-coach

Current position
- Title: Assistant coach
- Team: Loyola Marymount
- Conference: WCC

Biographical details
- Born: January 22, 1966 (age 60); Dayton, Ohio, U.S.

Coaching career (HC unless noted)
- 1996–2006: NC State (assistant)
- 2006–2008: Arizona State (assistant)
- 2008–2013: Drake
- 2013–2014: Missouri (assistant)
- 2014–2015: Marquette (assistant)
- 2015–2019: Arizona (assistant)
- 2020–2024: Prolific Prep (CA)
- 2024–present: Loyola Marymount (assistant)

Head coaching record
- Overall: 77–86 (.472)

Mark Edward Phelps (born January 22, 1966) is an American basketball coach who is currently an assistant coach at Loyola Marymount University.

== Coaching career ==
Prior to his current job, Phelps was an assistant at the University of Arizona from 2015-2019. Phelps spent the 2013–14 season as an assistant coach for Marquette University. His most recent NCAA head coaching job was with the Drake University men's basketball team. He was named the 25th head basketball coach at Drake University and successor to Keno Davis on April 21, 2008. He was fired by Drake on March 14, 2013. He has a B.S. in physical education from Old Dominion University, which he received in 1996, and is a 1984 graduate of Kempsville High School in Virginia Beach, Virginia.

On May 18, 2015, Phelps was hired as an assistant to Sean Miller's staff at the University of Arizona. Phelps was hired to replace assistant Damon Stoudamire who left to return to his old position under Josh Pastner at the University of Memphis.

== Head coaching record ==
Record table
Season	Team	Overall	Conference	Standing	Postseason
Drake (Missouri Valley Conference) (2008–present)
2008–09	Drake	17–16	7–11	T–8th	CIT, First Round
2009–10	Drake	14–19	7–11	8th	
2010–11	Drake	13–18	7–11	7th	
2011–12	Drake	18–16	9–9	T–3rd	CIT, Second Round
2012–13	Drake	15–17	7–11	T–7th	
Drake:		77–86 (.472)	37–53 (.411)		
Total:		77–86 (.472)			
National champion Postseason invitational champion Conference regular season champion Conference regular season and conference tournament champion Division regular season champion Division regular season and conference tournament champion Conference tournament champion
