= Jevon Carter =

American basketball player (born 1995)

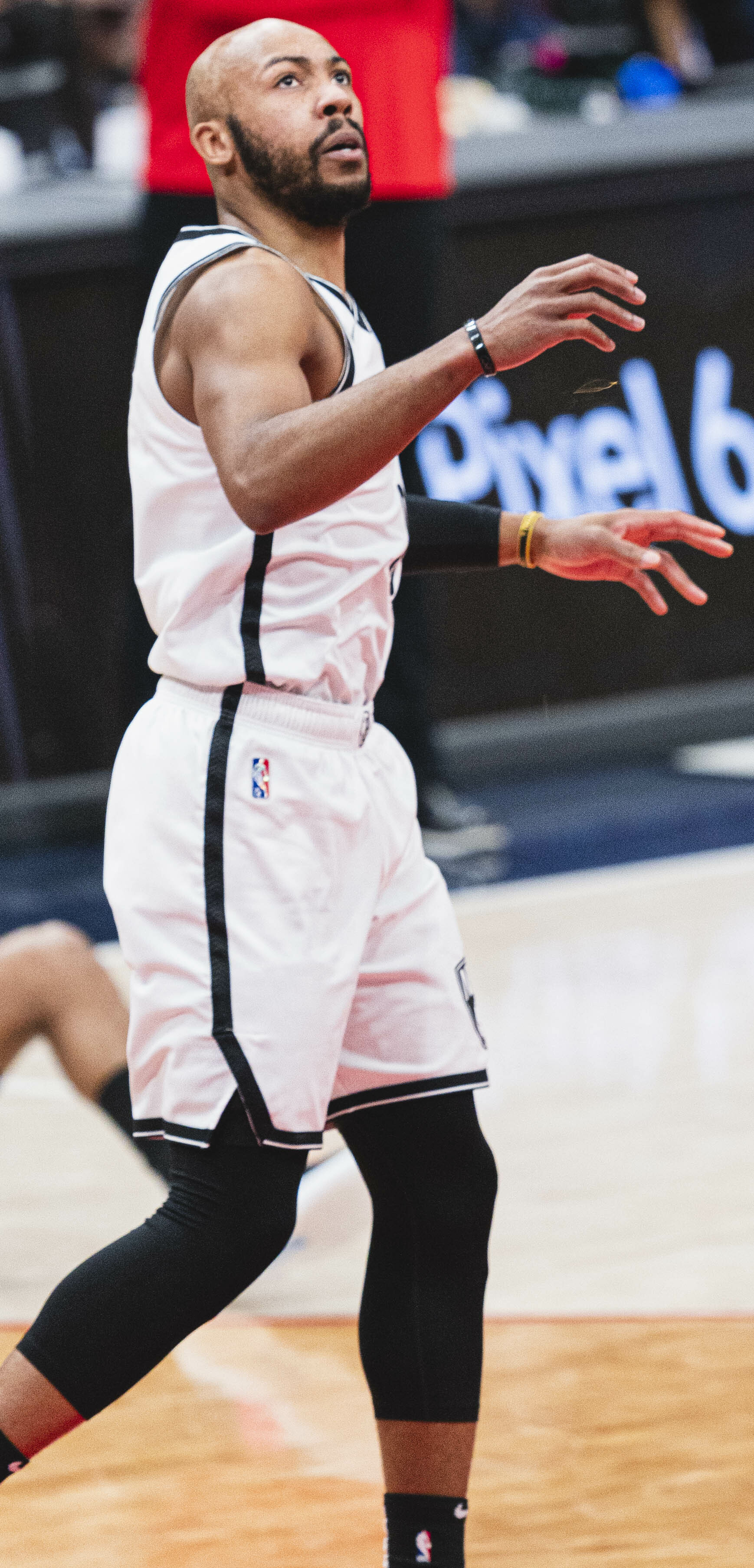
- Carter with the Brooklyn Nets in 2022

No. 2 – Orlando Magic
- Position: Point guard
- League: NBA

Personal information
- Born: September 14, 1995 (age 31) Maywood, Illinois, U.S.
- Listed height: 6 ft 1 in (1.85 m)
- Listed weight: 190 lb (86 kg)

Career information
- High school: Proviso East (Maywood, Illinois)
- College: West Virginia (2014–2018)
- NBA draft: 2018: 2nd round, 32nd overall pick
- Drafted by: Memphis Grizzlies
- Playing career: 2018–present

Career history
- 2018–2019: Memphis Grizzlies
- 2018–2019: →Memphis Hustle
- 2019–2021: Phoenix Suns
- 2021–2022: Brooklyn Nets
- 2022–2023: Milwaukee Bucks
- 2023–2026: Chicago Bulls
- 2026–present: Orlando Magic

Career highlights
- Naismith Defensive Player of the Year (2018); 2× NABC Defensive Player of the Year (2017, 2018); 2× Lefty Driesell Award (2017, 2018); Senior CLASS Award (2018); Consensus second-team All-American (2018); Academic All-American of the Year (2018); First-team All-Big 12 (2018); Second-team All-Big 12 (2017); 2× Big 12 Defensive Player of the Year (2017, 2018); 4× Big 12 All-Defensive team (2015–2018)
- Stats at NBA.com
- Stats at Basketball Reference

Leroy Jevon Carter (/dʒəˈvɒn/ jə-VON; born September 14, 1995) is an American professional basketball player for the Orlando Magic of the National Basketball Association (NBA). He played college basketball for the West Virginia Mountaineers. A point guard for the Mountaineers, Carter was known as one of the top defensive players in college basketball, winning the NABC Defensive Player of the Year and the Lefty Driesell Award after both his junior and senior seasons, and winning the inaugural Naismith Defensive Player of the Year in his final season.

== Early life ==
Carter played basketball at Proviso East High School in Maywood, Illinois. He played mostly off the ball in high school. From 2011 to 2012 he played for Team NLP in AAU competition, where one of his teammates was Jalen Brunson. Carter was a three-star recruit and was the No. 299 player in the 2014 class according to 247Sports.com. He received scholarship offers from Akron, Dartmouth, Kent State, Lehigh, Toledo, Valparaiso, UW-Green Bay and Illinois State, but committed to West Virginia.

== College career ==
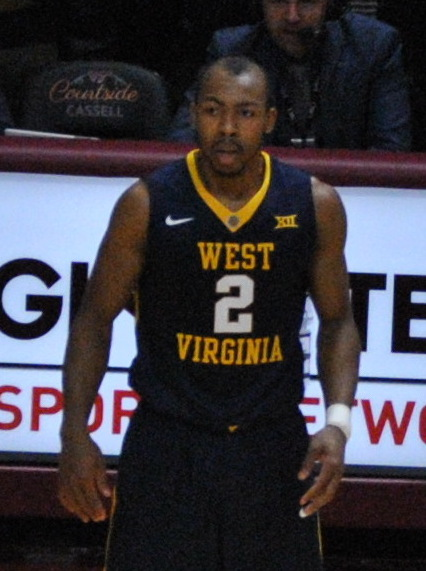
Carter in 2015

He converted to the point guard position at West Virginia, making his name as one of the top defensive players in the Big 12 Conference. He was one of the architects of "Press Virginia", coach Bob Huggins's defensive scheme that forces many turnovers. Carter became a starter as a sophomore and averaged 9.5 points and 2.3 rebounds per game.

In Carter's junior season in 2016–17, he averaged 13.5 points, 5.0 rebounds and 3.6 assists per game. He received many accolades for his defensive prowess, earning Big 12 Defensive Player of the Year, as well as the Lefty Driesell Award and the NABC Defensive Player of the Year as the top defensive player in the country. Following his junior season, Carter declared for the 2017 NBA draft, but did not hire an agent. Ultimately he decided to return to the Mountaineers for his senior season.

Before the start of the 2017–18 season, Carter was unanimously named to the preseason All-Big 12 team. On November 30, 2017, Carter became WVU's all-time leader in steals, surpassing Greg Jones' mark of 252 during a win over NJIT. On March 3, 2018, against Iowa State, he became the first major conference player to reach 1500 points, 500 rebounds, 500 assists and 300 steals in a career.

On March 12, 2018, Carter was named Academic All-American of the Year for Division I men's basketball.

For the 2017–18 season, Carter was named a second-team All-American by the Associated Press. He was also named to the Sporting News second team, and the National Association of Basketball Coaches (NABC) third team, resulting in consensus second-team All-America honors. Later that same week, he was added to the 2018 John R. Wooden Award All American Team. He was also named the 2018 Senior CLASS Award winner. This award (Celebrating Loyalty and Achievement for Staying in School), given annually, is for the most outstanding senior student athlete in Men's Basketball. Carter is the second player in West Virginia University history to win this award, the first being Da'Sean Butler, who won it in 2010.

For his senior season, Jevon Carter won many postseason awards for his defensive play, including Big 12 Defensive Player of the Year, the NABC Defensive Player of the Year, the Lefty Driesell Player of the Year and the Naismith Defensive Player of the Year. Carter became the first player to win the Lefty Driesell Player of the Year more than once and only the 7th player to win the NABC Defensive Player of the Year more than once, the first since Hasheem Thabeet won in the 2007–08 season and the 2008–09 season. He won the inaugural Naismith Defensive Player of the Year award.

== Professional career ==
=== Memphis Grizzlies (2018–2019) ===
On June 21, 2018, Carter was selected by the Memphis Grizzlies in the second round of the 2018 NBA draft with the 32nd overall pick. On July 12, 2018, the Memphis Grizzlies announced that they had officially signed with Carter. During his rookie season, he has had multiple assignments to the Memphis Hustle, the Grizzlies' G League affiliate. Carter made his NBA debut on December 15, 2018, coming off the bench in a 97–105 loss to the Houston Rockets with eleven points, two steals, a rebound and a block. On April 10, 2019, Carter scored a then-career-high 32 points along with four rebounds, two assists and a steal in a 132–117 win over the Golden State Warriors.

=== Phoenix Suns (2019–2021) ===
On July 7, 2019, the Grizzlies traded Carter to the Phoenix Suns. On August 8 in the 2020 NBA Bubble, Carter scored a season-high 20 points on 7–10 shooting, including 6–9 from the three-point line in a 119–112 win over the Miami Heat. His previous season-highs both had him scoring 15 points before the season's suspension began.

On November 21, 2020, as a restricted free agent, Carter signed a 3-year, $11.5 million contract to remain with the Suns. Carter made it to the 2021 NBA Finals, but the Suns were defeated in 6 games by the Milwaukee Bucks.

=== Brooklyn Nets (2021–2022) ===
On August 6, 2021, Carter and the draft rights to Day'Ron Sharpe were traded to the Brooklyn Nets in exchange for Landry Shamet. He was waived on February 22, 2022, when the Nets signed Goran Dragić.

=== Milwaukee Bucks (2022–2023) ===
On February 24, 2022, Carter signed with the Milwaukee Bucks for the remainder of the season. On April 1, in his first start for the Bucks, Carter scored 18 points and recorded a season-high 8 assists.

On July 6, 2022, Carter re-signed with the Bucks on a two-year, $4.3 million contract with a player option in the second year. On November 9, Carter set a career-high with 36 points and added 12 assists in a 136–132 double-overtime win against the Oklahoma City Thunder.

=== Chicago Bulls (2023–2026) ===
On July 10, 2023, Carter signed a three-year, $20 million contract with the Chicago Bulls. He made 72 appearances for the Bulls during the 2023–24 NBA season, recording averages of 5.0 points, 0.8 rebounds, and 1.3 assists. Carter made 36 appearances (including one start) for Chicago during the 2024–25 season, averaging 4.3 points, 1.1 rebounds, and 1.1 assists.

Carter played in 23 games for Chicago during the 2025–26 season, recording averages of 5.4 points, 1.1 rebounds, and 0.8 assists. On February 1, 2026, Carter was waived by the Bulls.

=== Orlando Magic (2026–present) ===
On February 6, 2026, Carter signed with the Orlando Magic for the remainder of the 2025–26 NBA season, after the Magic traded Tyus Jones and two second picks to the Charlotte Hornets for cash considerations. He made 30 appearances (including one start) for the Magic, averaging 7.2 points, 2.1 rebounds, and 2.3 assists.

On July 1, 2026, Carter re-signed with Orlando on a one-year, $3.5 million contract.

== Career statistics ==
Legend
GP	Games played	GS	Games started	MPG	Minutes per game
FG%	Field goal percentage	3P%	3-point field goal percentage	FT%	Free throw percentage
RPG	Rebounds per game	APG	Assists per game	SPG	Steals per game
BPG	Blocks per game	PPG	Points per game	**Bold**	Career high
*	Led the league

=== NBA ===
==== Regular season ====
Year	Team	GP	GS	MPG	FG%	3P%	FT%	RPG	APG	SPG	BPG	PPG
2018–19	Memphis	39	3	14.8	.303	.333	.813	1.7	1.8	.7	.3	4.4
2019–20	Phoenix	58	2	16.3	.416	.425	.852	2.0	1.4	.8	.3	4.9
2020–21	Phoenix	60	1	11.9	.422	.371	.571	1.5	1.2	.5	.2	4.1
2021–22	Brooklyn	46	1	12.0	.333	.331	.700	1.5	1.0	.3	.2	3.6
2021–22	Milwaukee	20	2	17.7	**.506**	**.558**	**1.000**	2.2	**2.5**	.5	.2	5.6
2022–23	Milwaukee	**81**	**39**	**22.4**	.423	.421	.816	**2.5**	2.4	.8	**.4**	**8.0**
2023–24	Chicago	72	0	13.9	.378	.329	.571	.8	1.3	.5	.2	5.0
2024–25	Chicago	36	1	8.9	.377	.333	.800	1.1	1.1	.4	.1	4.3
2025–26	Chicago	23	0	11.0	.398	.410	**1.000**	1.1	.8	.6	.1	5.4
2025–26	Orlando	30	1	20.4	.402	.336	.556	2.1	2.3	**.9**	.3	7.2
Career		465	50	15.4	.395	.377	.797	1.7	1.6	.6	.2	5.3

==== Playoffs ====
Year	Team	GP	GS	MPG	FG%	3P%	FT%	RPG	APG	SPG	BPG	PPG
2021	Phoenix	7	0	3.1	.375	.000	.000	.3	.6	.0	.0	.9
2022	Milwaukee	**11**	0	11.4	**.474**	**.429**	**1.000**	**1.5**	.9	**.7**	.0	**2.1**
2023	Milwaukee	4	0	**12.3**	.222	.143	—	1.0	**1.0**	.3	.0	1.3
2026	Orlando	3	0	5.7	.250	.000	—	.7	.7	.3	.0	.7
Career		25	0	8.6	.375	.222	.500	1.0	.8	.4	.0	1.4

=== College ===
Year	Team	GP	GS	MPG	FG%	3P%	FT%	RPG	APG	SPG	BPG	PPG
2014–15	West Virginia	35	4	23.8	.360	.314	.770	2.3	1.8	1.9	.1	8.1
2015–16	West Virginia	35	35	27.7	.383	.306	.744	2.9	3.3	1.7	.3	9.5
2016–17	West Virginia	**37**	36	32.0	**.439**	.389	.774	**5.0**	3.7	2.5*	.2	13.5
2017–18	West Virginia	**37**	**37**	**35.5**	.422	**.393**	**.858**	4.6	**6.6**	**3.0***	**.4**	**17.3**
Career		144	112	29.9	.407	.355	.798	3.7	3.9	2.3	.2	12.2

== Career highlights ==
=== Awards and honors ===
- Naismith Defensive Player of the Year (2018)
- 2× NABC Defensive Player of the Year (2017, 2018)
- 2× Lefty Driesell Award (2017, 2018)
- Senior CLASS Award (2018)
- Consensus second-team All-American (2018)
- Academic All-American of the Year (2018)
- First-team All-Big 12 (2018)
- Second-team All-Big 12 (2017)
- 2× Big 12 Defensive Player of the Year (2017, 2018)
- 4× Big 12 All-Defensive team (2015–2018)

=== Records ===
- WVU career steal leader (330)
- WVU single-season steal leader (112, 2018)
- WVU single-season assist leader (246, 2018)
- Sole 4x Big 12 All-Defensive Team Member

== Endorsements ==
On August 3, 2018, Carter and And1 announced via Instagram that Carter had signed to become an And1 brand ambassador.
