= Deandre Ayton =

Bahamian basketball player (born 1998)

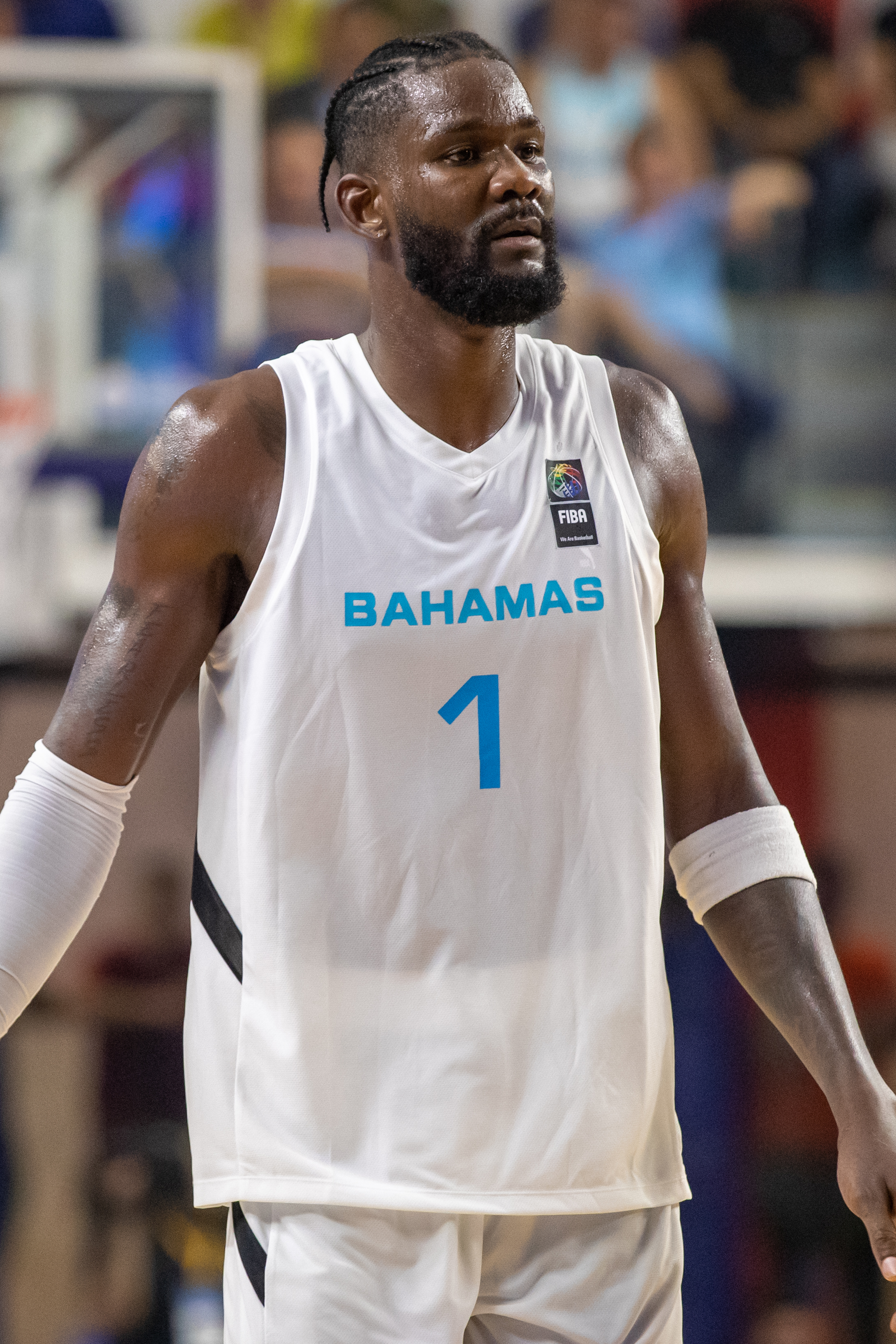
- Ayton with the Bahamas in 2023

No. 8 – Washington Wizards
- Position: Center
- League: NBA

Personal information
- Born: July 23, 1998 (age 28) Nassau, The Bahamas
- Listed height: 7 ft 0 in (2.13 m)
- Listed weight: 252 lb (114 kg)

Career information
- High school: Balboa City School (San Diego, California); Hillcrest Prep Academy (Phoenix, Arizona)
- College: Arizona (2017–2018)
- NBA draft: 2018: 1st round, 1st overall pick
- Drafted by: Phoenix Suns
- Playing career: 2018–present

Career history
- 2018–2023: Phoenix Suns
- 2023–2025: Portland Trail Blazers
- 2025–2026: Los Angeles Lakers
- 2026–present: Washington Wizards

Career highlights
- NBA All-Rookie First Team (2019); Consensus first-team All-American (2018); Karl Malone Award (2018); Pac-12 Player of the Year (2018); First-team All-Pac-12 (2018); Pac-12 Freshman of the Year (2018); Pac-12 tournament MOP (2018); McDonald's All-American (2017)
- Stats at NBA.com
- Stats at Basketball Reference

Deandre Edoneille Ayton (/diˈɑːndreɪ ˈeɪtən/ dee-AHN-dray AY-tən; born July 23, 1998), nicknamed "DominAyton", is a Bahamian professional basketball player for the Washington Wizards of the National Basketball Association (NBA). A consensus five-star prospect in the Class of 2017 and a McDonald's All-American, he played one season of college basketball for the Arizona Wildcats, earning Pac-12 Player of the Year honors. Ayton was selected with the first overall pick in the 2018 NBA draft by the Phoenix Suns and was named to the NBA All-Rookie First Team in 2019. In 2021, he helped lead the Suns to their first NBA Finals appearance since 1993. In 2023, Ayton was traded to the Portland Trail Blazers in a 3-team trade that sent Damian Lillard to the Milwaukee Bucks.

== Early life ==
Ayton is of Nigerian and Jamaican descent. Having played basketball since fourth grade, by age 12, he was 6 feet 5 inches (1.96 m). Ayton moved from Bahamas to attend high school in San Diego, California.

== High school career ==
Ayton attended Balboa School in California and started on the varsity basketball team for two years. As a sophomore in 2014–15, Ayton led Balboa to a 17–14 record, averaging 21 points, 16 rebounds and 6.9 blocks per game. He racked up double-doubles in 21 of 22 regular season games. That summer, he averaged 16.5 points, 13.5 rebounds and 2.2 blocks a game for Supreme Court AAU (California) on the Under Armour circuit.

Ayton in 2015–16, his junior year, transferred to Hillcrest Prep Academy in Phoenix, Arizona to play out his last two years. During this high school year, he became teammates with another top-tier Class of 2017 player in 2018's #2 pick Marvin Bagley III. Throughout his junior year, Ayton averaged 29.2 points, 16.7 rebounds, 3.8 blocks per game.

As a senior in 2016–17, Ayton led Hillcrest to a 33–6 record and national rankings across multiple outlets while averaging 26 points, 15 rebounds and 3.5 blocks. He led Hillcrest to a Grind Session World Championship, earning Finals MVP and season MVP. While representing the World Select team, Ayton played at the 2016 Nike Hoop Summit, chipping in with eight points to go along with seven rebounds.

=== Recruiting ===
Ayton was considered one of the top prospects in the 2017 recruiting class by Scout.com, Rivals.com, and ESPN. He was rated as a five-star recruit and the No. 3 overall recruit and No. 1 center in the 2017 high school class. In 2015, he was ranked by Scout as the top prospect in all of high school in their "Ultimate 100" list. Ayton had narrowed his choices between three schools: Arizona, Kansas and Kentucky. On September 6, 2016, he committed to play for the Arizona Wildcats, and signed his letter of intent.

College recruiting
Name	Hometown	School	Height	Weight	Commit date
Deandre Ayton; C	Phoenix, Arizona	Hillcrest Prep Academy (AZ)	7 ft 0 in (2.13 m)	235 lb (107 kg)	Sep 6, 2016
Deandre Ayton; C	Recruit ratings: Scout: Rivals: 247Sports: ESPN: (97)				
Overall recruit ranking: Scout: 5 Rivals: 3 247Sports: 4 ESPN: 3
Note: In many cases, Scout, Rivals, 247Sports, On3, and ESPN may conflict in their listings of height and weight.; In these cases, the average was taken. ESPN grades are on a 100-point scale.; Sources: "Arizona 2017 Basketball Commitments". Rivals.; "2017 Arizona Basketball Commits". Scout.; "2017 Arizona Wildcats Recruiting Class". ESPN.; "Scout.com Team Recruiting Rankings". Scout.; "2017 Team Ranking". Rivals.; "2017 Arizona 24/7 Sports Commits". 247Sports.

== College career ==
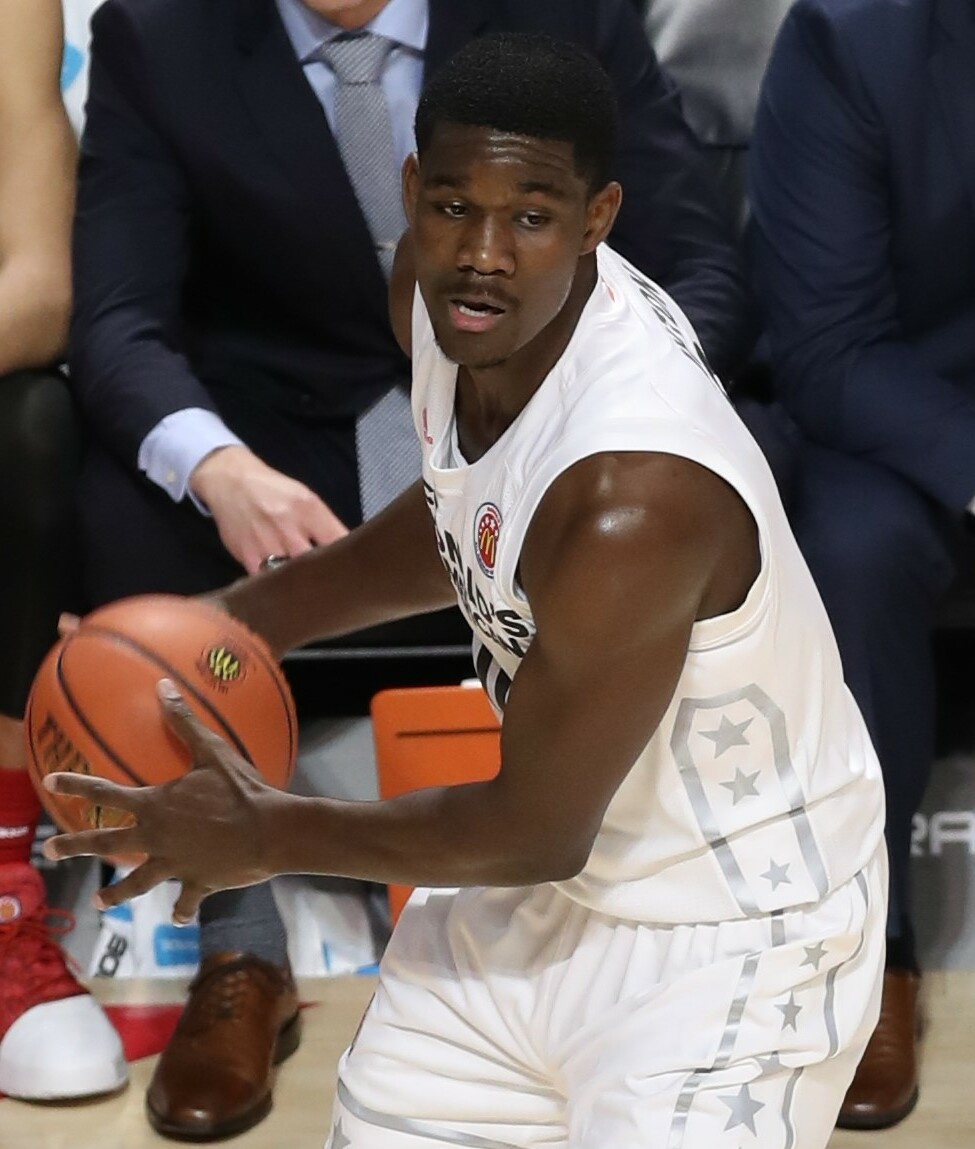
Ayton in 2017

Ayton made his debut with the University of Arizona on November 10, 2017, recording 19 points, 12 rebounds, and 3 blocks in a 101–67 win over the Northern Arizona Lumberjacks. His 19 points was 7th most for a freshman in an Arizona debut. Throughout his college career, he was used as a power forward instead of center; Dušan Ristić was Arizona's starting center instead. On December 9, 2017, Ayton recorded what was, at the time, a season-high 29 points and 18 rebounds in an 88–82 win over the Alabama Crimson Tide. On December 30, 2017, against the in-state rival Arizona State Sun Devils, he recorded 19 rebounds, which would be a season-high at the time. On January 20, 2018, against Stanford, he blocked six shots, which tied him for most in Arizona freshman single game history. He had also recorded 17 20-point games and 23 double-doubles through 34 games. However, while Ayton had some great successes during his freshman season, there were also controversies mired during his last few months there.

On February 23, 2018, a reported FBI wiretap revealed Arizona's head coach, Sean Miller, allegedly talked with Christian Dawkins (a key figure involved in the 2017–18 NCAA Division I men's basketball corruption scandal) to discuss paying Ayton $100,000 to allow him to enter the university, with the monetary situation being dealt with directly to him. While Miller would not be coaching the next game a day later against Oregon (assistant coach Lorenzo Romar would replace Miller that night), Ayton would still be allowed to play that day as the starting center. In that game, Ayton would record 28 points, 18 rebounds, and 4 blocks in the overtime loss to Oregon. The wiretapped conversation reportedly occurred in 2016, when Ayton was still attending the Hillcrest Prep Academy. Later on October 11, 2018, a government official revealed a now-former Adidas consultant named T.J. Gassnola paid a currently unknown amount of money to Ayton's family via Christian Dawkins in order to attend some Adidas sponsored programs. On May 2, 2019, federal prosecutors played a wiretapped call from June 20, 2017, between Dawkins and former assistant coach Emanuel Richardson that Miller was paying Ayton $10,000 per month while enrolled at Arizona.

On March 3, 2018, after their last regular season home game against California, where he'd record 26 points and a career-high 20 rebounds in a 66–54 win over California, head coach Sean Miller honored Ayton, as well as underclassmen Rawle Alkins and Allonzo Trier, with confirmations that they'd all be entering the 2018 NBA draft at the end of this season. On March 9, Ayton would record a career-high 32 points with 14 rebounds in a 78–67 overtime win against UCLA. He'd tie that career high for points the next day alongside grabbing 18 rebounds in the Pac-12 Championship game against USC, where the Wildcats won 75–61. Ayton would be named the Pac-12 Tournament's Most Outstanding Player during the event. At the end of the regular season, Ayton was named both the Pac-12's Player of the Year and Freshman of the Year, as well as become a member of the All-Pac-12 first team (in terms of both regular voting and voting through the Associated Press) and be named the winner of the Karl Malone Award. He was also voted a consensus first-team All-American. Furthermore, Ayton was one of three freshman to be a part of the All-American First Team, joining Marvin Bagley III and Trae Young for the most consensus freshmen First Team members in a season.

Following Arizona's upset loss to the University at Buffalo in the Round of 64 of the 2018 NCAA men's basketball tournament, Ayton announced his intention to forgo his final three seasons of collegiate eligibility and declare for the 2018 NBA draft, where he was expected to be a top-tier lottery selection, if not the potential #1 draft pick. On April 26, 2018, Ayton announced he signed with agent Nima Namakian.

== Professional career ==
=== Phoenix Suns (2018–2023) ===
==== 2018–19 season: All-Rookie honors ====
On June 21, 2018, the Phoenix Suns selected Ayton with the first overall pick in the 2018 NBA draft. He was the franchise's first No. 1 pick in their history. Never before had the player picked with the first overall selection gone to a team from the state where he played in high school and college before entering the NBA. Ayton joined the 2018 NBA Summer League Suns squad on July 1, 2018, signing his rookie-scale contract five days later. In his Summer League debut on July 6, Ayton recorded 10 points and 8 rebounds in a 92–85 win over the Dallas Mavericks. At the end of the event, Ayton averaged a double-double of 14.5 points and 10.5 rebounds in four games played and named a member of the All-Summer League Second Team. He also averaged 18.2 points, 9.8 rebounds, 2.0 blocks, 1.4 assists, and 0.8 steals per game in five games during the 2018 preseason with the Suns. Near the end of the preseason, he led all NBA players in points, rebounds, blocks, free-throws, and field goal attempts.

Ayton made his NBA debut in the season opener on October 17, 2018, and earned a double-double with 18 points and 10 rebounds, as well as a season-high 6 assists, a steal, and a block with 36 minutes played as a starter in a 121–100 win over the Dallas Mavericks. It made Ayton the first player to record these stats in their debut game since Kareem Abdul-Jabbar in 1969, as well as the third player since Oscar Robertson in 1960. Five days later, Ayton recorded a double-double of 20 points and 14 rebounds (alongside five assists) in a 123–103 loss to the Golden State Warriors. On October 27, he recorded 24 points on near-perfect shooting (12/13 shots made) alongside 5 assists in a loss to the Memphis Grizzlies. He became the second rookie in 40 seasons (first being Adam Keefe) to score at least 12 shots with a 90% or higher field goal percentage. Six days later, Ayton recorded a double-double of 17 points and a season-high 18 rebounds in a 107–98 loss to the Toronto Raptors. Ayton later recorded a new career high of 33 points, alongside 14 rebounds, in a 122–118 loss to the Denver Nuggets on December 29. Through the first half of the season, Ayton started in every game for the Suns when he was healthy, save for one. On January 29, 2019, Ayton was named a member of the World Team for the Rising Stars Challenge in the 2019 NBA All-Star Weekend. On March 27, Ayton broke Alvan Adams' rookie record for most double-doubles recorded by a rookie in franchise history. However, Ayton sprained his left ankle three days later against the Memphis Grizzlies, ending his rookie season early. He became the third rookie in a decade to average a double-double in their rookie season, joining Blake Griffin and Karl-Anthony Towns. At the conclusion of the season, Ayton was named as one of three finalists for the NBA Rookie of the Year Award in the 2019 NBA Awards show. On May 21, Ayton was selected to the 2019 All-Rookie First Team.

==== 2019–20 season: Suspension and improving as a sophomore ====
On October 24, 2019, after the 2019–20 season opener, Ayton was suspended for 25 games after testing positive for a diuretic, violating the league's anti-drug policy. He returned from his suspension on December 17 against the Los Angeles Clippers, putting up 18 points and 12 rebounds in a 120–99 loss. Ayton was later immediately sidelined for the next five games due to a sprained right ankle before returning again, this time coming off the bench, on December 30 in a 122–116 win over the Portland Trail Blazers. He returned as a starter, albeit as a power forward, on January 3, 2020, in a 120–112 win over the New York Knicks. After a few more games, Ayton became the team's starting center again on January 16. That night, he scored 26 points and grabbed a career-high 21 rebounds in a 121–98 win over the Knicks. He became the first Suns player since Steve Nash to put up a 20/20 kind of game for the team (first player since Amar'e Stoudemire in terms of points and rebounds specifically), as well as the youngest player to have 25+ points and 20+ rebounds in the Madison Square Garden. On January 28, Ayton scored a season-high 31 points in a 133–104 win over the Dallas Mavericks. Two days later, Ayton was announced to return to the Rising Stars Challenge for the World Team; he joined only Amar'e Stoudemire and Devin Booker as announced participants in the event for the Suns as both a rookie and sophomore, though he would not play due to a left ankle injury, eventually being replaced by Nicolò Melli. On February 8, Ayton scored 28 points and grabbed 19 rebounds in a loss to the Denver Nuggets. He became the quickest player in franchise history to reach 1,000 rebounds at 94 games, as well as the fourth-quickest player to reach 1,000 since 1992. Ayton later matched his performance of 28 points and 19 rebounds on February 22 in a 112–104 win over the Chicago Bulls. After getting an ankle injury on March 3 against the Toronto Raptors, Ayton returned to play in the resumed season's bubble games on July 31, getting 24 points (including 2-for-3 three-point shooting for his first professional three-pointers made) and 12 rebounds in a 125–112 win over the Washington Wizards. He started in seven of the team's eight games in the 2020 NBA Bubble to give them a perfect 8–0 record there, giving the Suns their first eight-game winning streak since the 2009–10 season, ending their regular season with a 34–39 record.

==== 2020–21 season: First playoff appearance and NBA Finals ====
After struggling on the offensive end earlier on in the season (focusing more on defense instead), Ayton would return from the team's three-game suspension (due to COVID-19 protocols in the middle of January) with back-to-back nights as the team's leading rebounder and scorer on January 18 and 20, 2021. In the January 20 game against the Houston Rockets, Ayton had 26 points, 17 rebounds, and a career-high 5 blocks in a 109–103 win on the road. He became the first Suns player since Shawn Marion in 2007 to put up at least 25 points, 15 rebounds, and 5 blocks in a single game, as well as the only other Suns player to do it in the last 30 seasons. Ayton would help Phoenix clinch their first playoff berth since 2010.

On May 23, Ayton made his NBA playoff debut, scoring 21 points on 10-of-11 shooting, to go along with 16 rebounds, in a 99–90 victory in Game 1 of the first round over the defending champion Los Angeles Lakers. In Game 2 of the Conference Finals, Ayton put up 24 points, alongside a buzzer-beating, game-winning alley-oop dunk, and 14 rebounds, in a 104–103 victory over the Los Angeles Clippers to take a 2–0 series lead. In Game 4 of the Conference Finals, Ayton put up 19 points, 22 rebounds and 4 blocks in an 84–80 victory over the Clippers. In Game 6 of the Conference Finals, Ayton put up 16 points and 17 rebounds in a 130–103 victory over the Clippers, to lead the Suns to the NBA Finals for the first time since 1993. In Game 1 of the NBA Finals against the Milwaukee Bucks, Ayton put up 22 points and 19 rebounds in a 118–105 win. The Suns went on to take a 2–0 series lead, but lost the series in six games.

==== 2021–22 season: Franchise record in wins ====
Ayton and the Phoenix Suns were unable to agree to a rookie extension before the season. On March 23, 2022, Ayton scored a career-high 35 points on 15-of-24 shooting from the field and grabbed 14 rebounds in a 125–116 win over the Minnesota Timberwolves. Ayton and the Suns finished the regular season with the league's best overall record at 64–18. On April 22, Ayton scored a playoff career-high 28 points, grabbed 17 rebounds and tied his playoff career-high with three steals in a 114–111 Game 3 win against the New Orleans Pelicans in the first round of the playoffs. On May 2, in Game 1 of the Western Conference Semifinals, Ayton logged 25 points and eight rebounds in a 121–114 win over the Dallas Mavericks. The Suns jumped to a 2–0 lead in the series before losing in seven games.

==== 2022–23 season: Contract extension ====
Unable to agree on a contract extension with the Phoenix Suns yet again, Ayton became a restricted free agent in the offseason. On July 14, 2022, he signed a four-year, $133 million offer sheet with the Indiana Pacers, the largest in league history. The Suns quickly matched the Pacers offer. On July 18, 2022, Ayton signed the Suns' multi-year contract. On November 25, Ayton scored 28 points on 11-of-13 shooting from the field and grabbed 12 rebounds in a 108–102 win over the Detroit Pistons. In the next game, Ayton recorded 29 points and a season-high 21 rebounds in an 113–112 win over the Utah Jazz. He became the first player to have at least 28 points and 20 rebounds in a game for the Suns since Amar'e Stoudemire in 2007. On November 29, Ayton was named the NBA Western Conference Player of the Week for Week 6 (November 21–27), his first career NBA Player of the Week award. He helped Phoenix secure an undefeated 3–0 week with averages of 23.7 points and 16.0 rebounds on 67.4% shooting from the field. The next day, Ayton scored 30 points along with 14 rebounds in a 132–113 win over the Chicago Bulls. On December 28, Ayton scored a season-high 31 points in a 127–108 loss against the Washington Wizards.

On February 4, 2023, Ayton tied his season-high with 31 points on 13-of-15 shooting from the field and grabbed 16 rebounds in a 116–110 win over the Detroit Pistons. In the next game, Ayton tied his career-high with 35 points on 14-of-18 shooting from the field and grabbed 15 rebounds (including a clutch, game-clinching rebound and two game-clinching free-throws) in a 116–112 win over the Brooklyn Nets.

=== Portland Trail Blazers (2023–2025) ===
On September 27, 2023, Ayton, Toumani Camara, and a 2029 first-round draft pick were traded to the Portland Trail Blazers alongside Jrue Holiday, as part of a three-team trade that sent Damian Lillard to the Milwaukee Bucks and Grayson Allen, Jusuf Nurkić, Nassir Little, and Keon Johnson to the Phoenix Suns.

On October 30, Ayton recorded 10 points and a career-high 23 rebounds in a 99–91 win over the Toronto Raptors. On January 17, 2024, he missed a game against the Brooklyn Nets due to icy conditions in his neighborhood preventing him from being able to travel to the Moda Center. Despite his absence, Portland defeated Brooklyn, 105–103. On March 9, Ayton posted 30 points and 19 rebounds in a 128–118 overtime win over the Toronto Raptors. On March 13, he scored 33 points and grabbed 19 rebounds on 15-of-20 shooting from the field in a 106–102 win over the Atlanta Hawks. On March 18, it was revealed Ayton had finished second in voting for NBA Western Conference Player of the Week for Week 21 (March 11–17), averaging 26.5 points and 14.0 rebounds while leading Portland to a 2–2 record. On April 5, he scored a season-high 34 points, along with 13 rebounds, three assists, two steals and two blocks in a 108–102 win over the Washington Wizards.

On June 29, 2025, the Trail Blazers and Ayton reached a buyout agreement, making him a free agent. According to Jason Quick of The Athletic, behind the scenes, the Blazers had grown tired of Ayton's bad habits. Ayton was reportedly late to practices and flights, and would skip rehab appointments.

=== Los Angeles Lakers (2025–2026) ===
On July 6, 2025, Ayton signed with the Los Angeles Lakers. The Athletic reported that the deal is for two years and $16.6 million, with a player option for the second season, according to league sources. Luka Doncic, one of the stars for the Lakers, also played a part in recruiting Ayton.

In December 2025, the NBA and the National Basketball Players Association announced that Ayton was the NBA Cares Bob Lanier Community Assist Award winner for November. He was being recognized for his leadership in hurricane relief efforts for Jamaica after Hurricane Melissa and created programs that promoted food access and cultural equity among underrepresented youth in Los Angeles. They donated $20,000 to the Ayton Family Foundation in recognition of his efforts.

On January 18, 2026, Ayton scored 25 points on 10-for-10 shooting and added 13 rebounds in the Lakers’ 110–93 victory over the Toronto Raptors. He became the 34th player in NBA history to make at least 10 shots without a miss while also grabbing at least 10 boards. He joined Wilt Chamberlain (March 11, 1969) and Mitch Kupchak (Nov. 20, 1981) as the only ones to do it in Lakers history.

=== Washington Wizards (2026–present) ===
On July 7, 2026, Ayton was traded to the Washington Wizards in exchange for Jaden Hardy and two future second-round picks. On October 21, he made his Wizards debut, putting up 11 points, four rebounds and two blocks in a 128–116 win over the Milwaukee Bucks.

== Player profile ==
Ayton is known for being a strong and athletic center at 7 feet 1 inch (2.16 m) in shoes, with a weight of 250 pounds (110 kg) being reported during his rookie season with Phoenix. His wingspan has been projected to be at 7 feet 5 inches (2.26 m), while his vertical leap is slated to be at 43.5 inches (1,100 mm). He sees his game as something akin to Hakeem Olajuwon's (primarily with his footwork, which allows him to keep up with smaller players) with the competitive mentality of Kevin Garnett. Prior to his draft in 2018, ESPN analyst Jay Williams compared him to David Robinson and Anthony Davis.

== Career statistics ==
Legend
GP	Games played	GS	Games started	MPG	Minutes per game
FG%	Field goal percentage	3P%	3-point field goal percentage	FT%	Free throw percentage
RPG	Rebounds per game	APG	Assists per game	SPG	Steals per game
BPG	Blocks per game	PPG	Points per game	**Bold**	Career high

=== NBA ===
==== Regular season ====
Year	Team	GP	GS	MPG	FG%	3P%	FT%	RPG	APG	SPG	BPG	PPG
2018–19	Phoenix	71	70	30.7	.585	.000	.746	10.3	1.8	.9	.9	16.3
2019–20	Phoenix	38	32	**32.5**	.546	.331	.753	**11.5**	**1.9**	.7	**1.5**	**18.2**
2020–21	Phoenix	69	69	30.6	.626	.200	.769	10.5	1.4	.6	1.2	14.4
2021–22	Phoenix	58	58	29.5	.634	**.368**	.746	10.2	1.4	.7	.7	17.2
2022–23	Phoenix	67	67	30.4	.589	.292	.760	10.0	1.7	.6	.8	18.0
2023–24	Portland	55	55	32.4	.570	.100	**.823**	11.1	1.6	**1.0**	.8	16.7
2024–25	Portland	40	40	30.2	.566	.188	.667	10.2	1.6	.8	1.0	14.4
2025–26	L.A. Lakers	**72**	**72**	27.2	**.671**	—	.645	8.0	.8	.6	1.0	12.5
Career		470	463	30.3	.599	.230	.741	10.1	1.5	.7	1.0	15.8

==== Playoffs ====
Year	Team	GP	GS	MPG	FG%	3P%	FT%	RPG	APG	SPG	BPG	PPG
2021	Phoenix	**22**	**22**	**36.4**	**.658**	—	**.736**	**11.8**	1.1	**.8**	**1.1**	15.8
2022	Phoenix	13	13	30.5	.640	**.500**	.636	8.9	**1.7**	.4	.8	**17.9**
2023	Phoenix	10	10	31.9	.550	—	.522	9.7	1.0	.6	.7	13.4
2026	L.A. Lakers	10	10	28.5	.548	—	.615	9.6	.9	.2	.8	10.0
Career		55	55	32.8	.617	.500	.656	10.3	1.2	.6	.9	14.8

=== College ===
Year	Team	GP	GS	MPG	FG%	3P%	FT%	RPG	APG	SPG	BPG	PPG
2017–18	Arizona	35	35	33.5	.612	.343	.733	11.6	1.6	.6	1.9	20.1

== Accomplishments and awards ==
NBA

- NBA All-Rookie First Team (2019)
- Rising Stars Challenge participant (2019)

College

- Karl Malone Award (2018)
- All-Pac-12 tournament team (2018)
- Pac-12 Tournament Most Outstanding Player (2018)
- NBC Sports First Team All-American (2018)
- AP Pac-12 Player of the Year (2018)
- AP Pac-12 Newcomer of the Year (2018)
- AP Pac-12 First Team All-American (2018)
- USA Today First Team All-American (2018)
- Sporting News First Team All-American (2018)
- Pac-12 Player of the Year (2018)
- Pac-12 Freshman Player of the Year (2018)
- All-Pac-12 First team (2018)
- All-Pac-12 Freshman team (2018)
- All-Pac-12 Defensive team (2018)
- USBWA District IX Player of the Year (2018)
- USBWA District IX All-District team (2018)
- USBWA First Team All-American (2018)
- NABC First Team All-American (2018)
- NABC District 20 First team (2018)
- AP First Team All-American (2018)

High School

- All-USA Boys Basketball First Team (2017)
- Naismith High School Boys All-America first team (2017)
- Maxpreps High School Boys Basketball All-American third team (2017)
- #0 retired by Hillcrest Prep (2018)

== National team career ==
Ayton represented The Bahamas in the 2016 Centrobasket, the regional basketball championship of FIBA Americas for the Central American and Caribbean subzone where he averaged a tournament-leading 11.1 rebounds per game. At age 18, he also averaged 16 points and 3.5 blocks per game. Seven years later, in 2023, Ayton joined the Bahamas national team for the 2024 Olympics Pre-Qualifying Tournament.

== Endorsements ==
In June 2018, Puma announced they would sponsor Ayton after the German company announced that they would be returning to the basketball market.

== Personal life ==
In the days after Hurricane Dorian struck The Bahamas, Ayton donated $100,000 to various relief efforts and held a relief drive on September 10, 2019, to collect further supplies and donations to give to those affected by the hurricane.

On March 6, 2021, Ayton welcomed his first son, Deandre Ayton Jr.

== See also ==
- List of NBA career field goal percentage leaders
- List of people banned or suspended by the NBA
