= Trae Young =

American basketball player (born 1998)

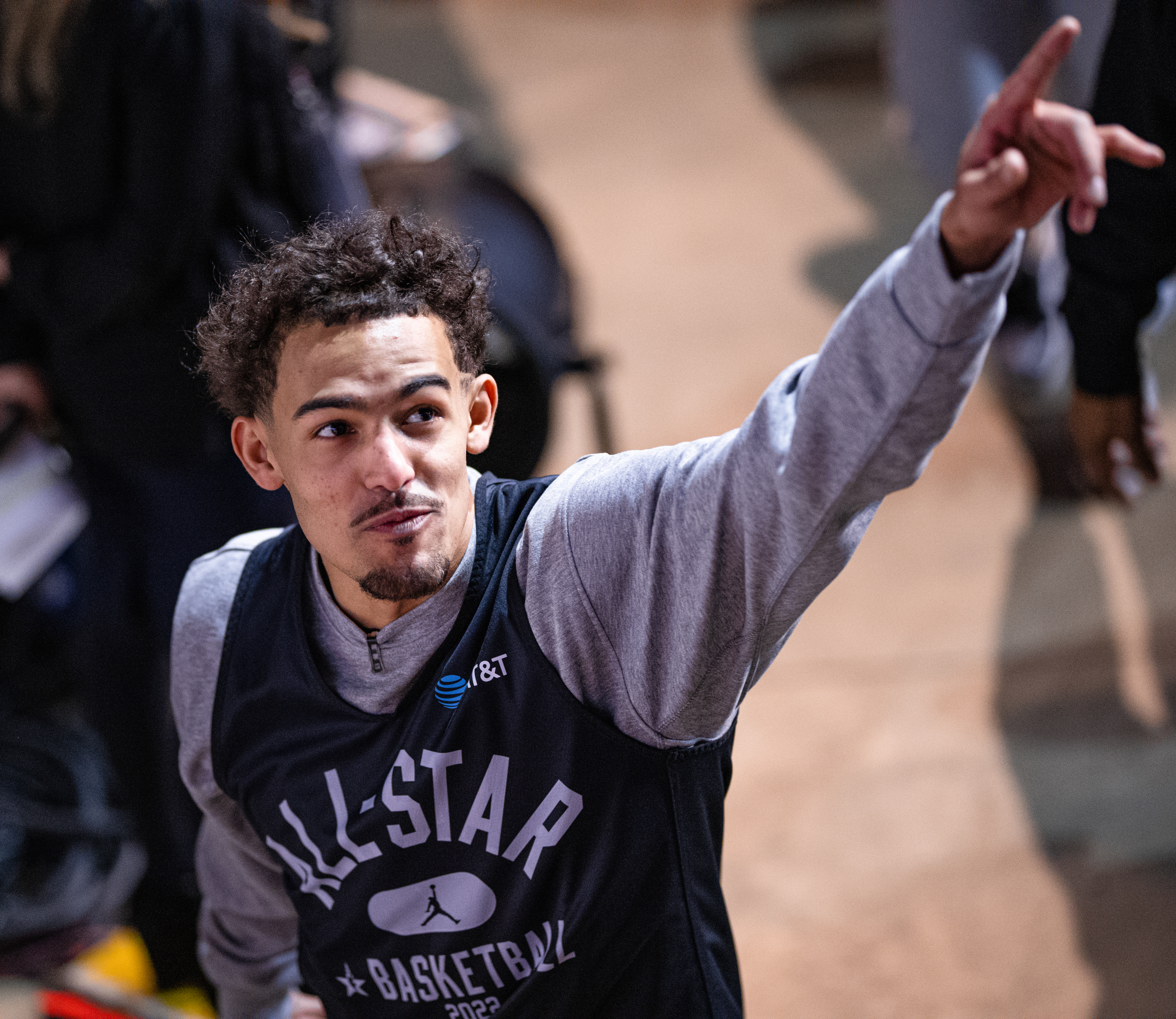
- Young at the 2022 NBA All-Star Game

No. 3 – Washington Wizards
- Position: Point guard
- League: NBA

Personal information
- Born: September 19, 1998 (age 28) Lubbock, Texas, U.S.
- Listed height: 6 ft 1 in (1.85 m)
- Listed weight: 164 lb (74 kg)

Career information
- High school: Norman North (Norman, Oklahoma)
- College: Oklahoma (2017–2018)
- NBA draft: 2018: 1st round, 5th overall pick
- Drafted by: Dallas Mavericks
- Playing career: 2018–present

Career history
- 2018–2026: Atlanta Hawks
- 2026–present: Washington Wizards

Career highlights
- 4× NBA All-Star (2020, 2022, 2024, 2025); All-NBA Third Team (2022); NBA All-Rookie First Team (2019); NBA assists leader (2025); Consensus first-team All-American (2018); Wayman Tisdale Award (2018); NCAA scoring champion (2018); NCAA assists leader (2018); First-team All-Big 12 (2018); Big 12 Freshman of the Year (2018); McDonald's All-American (2017)
- Stats at NBA.com
- Stats at Basketball Reference
Medals
Men's basketball
Representing the United States
FIBA Americas U18 Championship
Gold medal – first place	2016 Chile	National team

Rayford Trae Young (born September 19, 1998) is an American professional basketball player for the Washington Wizards of the National Basketball Association (NBA). He played college basketball for the Oklahoma Sooners, where in his one season in 2017–18, he tied the then NCAA Division I single-game assists record with 22 and became the only player to ever lead the NCAA in both points and assists in a single season. Nicknamed "Ice Trae", he was drafted by the Dallas Mavericks in the 2018 NBA draft with the fifth pick, and traded the same day to the Atlanta Hawks, along with a future first-round pick, for the draft rights to Luka Dončić. He joined Dončić in being a unanimous selection to the NBA All-Rookie First Team in 2019. He is a four-time NBA All-Star, and led the Hawks to three playoff runs, including a trip to the conference finals in 2021.

== Early life ==
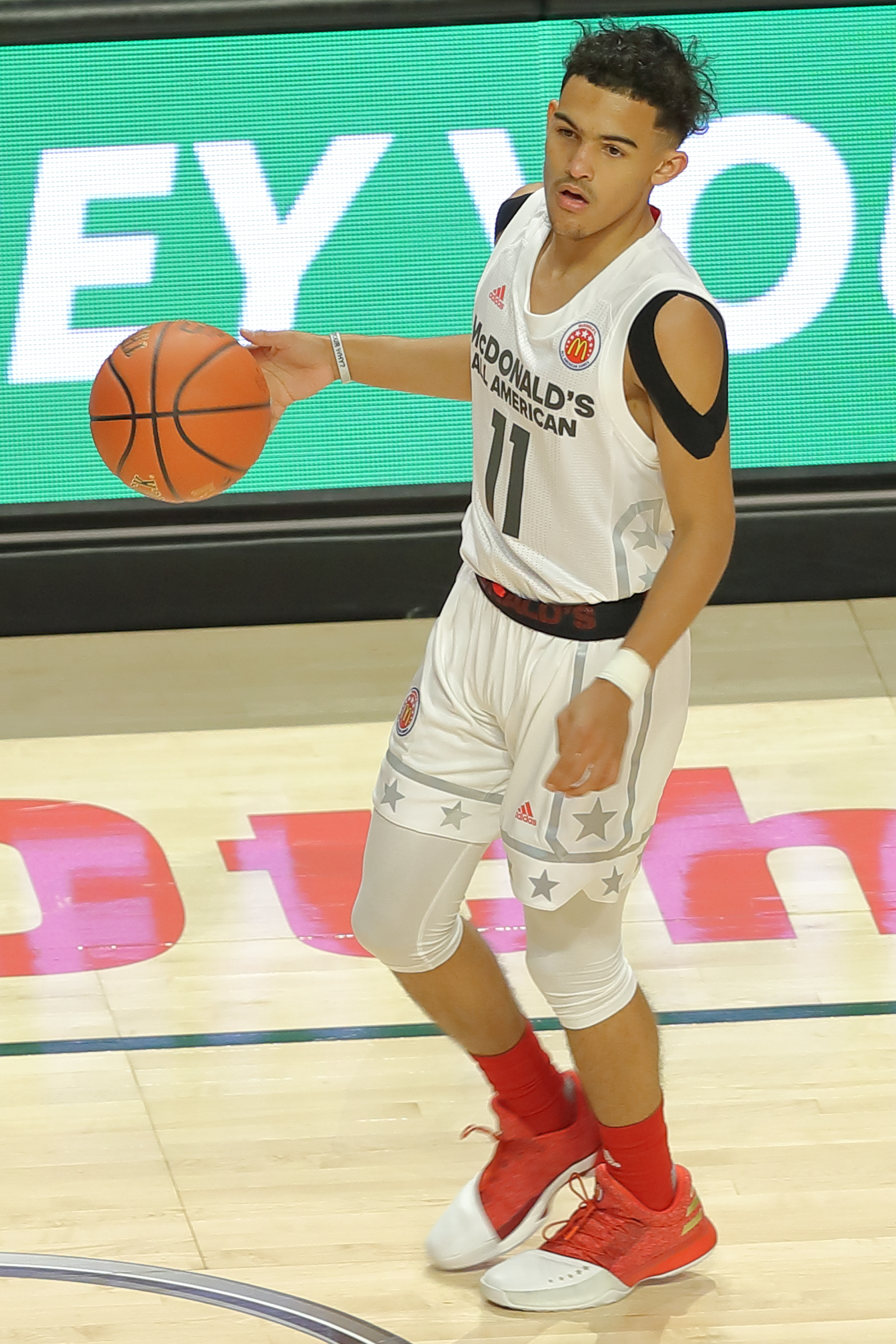
Young at the 2017 McDonald's All-American Boys Game

Born on September 19, 1998, in Lubbock, Texas, Trae is the son of Candice and Rayford Young, who played basketball at Texas Tech and professionally in Europe. He has a younger brother and two younger sisters. Young also has an uncle who played college basketball in the NAIA. Trae was raised in Pampa, Texas, by his mother and paternal grandparents, as his father played basketball overseas.

Young attended Norman North High School in Norman, Oklahoma. In his sophomore year, he averaged 25 points, 5 assists and 4 rebounds per game as he helped Norman North win the 2015 area championship and was named Oklahoma's Sophomore of the Year. During his junior year, he significantly improved his game, averaging 34.2 points, 4.6 rebounds and 4.6 assists as he led the team to a 28–4 record, winning the regional title and placing second in the 2016 Oklahoma Class 6A championship game. In his senior year, he averaged 42.6 points, 5.8 rebounds and 4.1 assists per game while shooting at a 48.9% rate.

=== Recruiting ===
Young was considered one of the best players in the 2017 recruiting class by Scout.com, Rivals.com and ESPN. ESPN considered him the second-best point guard prospect that year, while the other websites considered him the third best. On February 16, 2017, Young committed to the Oklahoma Sooners. He was the University of Oklahoma's first five-star recruit since Tiny Gallon in 2010.

College recruiting
Name	Hometown	School	Height	Weight	Commit date
Trae Young; PG	Norman, OK	Norman North High School (OK)	6 ft 2 in (1.88 m)	182 lb (83 kg)	Feb 16, 2017
Trae Young; PG	Recruit ratings: Scout: Rivals: 247Sports: ESPN: (94)				
Overall recruit ranking: Scout: 21 Rivals: 14 247Sports: 18 ESPN: 15
Note: In many cases, Scout, Rivals, 247Sports, On3, and ESPN may conflict in their listings of height and weight.; In these cases, the average was taken. ESPN grades are on a 100-point scale.; Sources: "Oklahoma 2017 Basketball Commitments". Rivals.; "2017 Oklahoma Basketball Commits". Scout.; "Scout.com Team Recruiting Rankings". Scout.; "2017 Team Ranking". Rivals.; "2017 Oklahoma 24/7 Sports Commits". 247Sports.

== College career ==
To begin the 2017–18 season, on November 12, Young recorded 15 points, 10 assists and six rebounds in a win over Omaha. Three days after his college debut, he recorded 22 points and a then season-high 13 assists in a win over Ball State. On November 26, Young recorded a season-high 43 points and seven assists in a 90–80 win over Oregon. That game had his name draw multiple comparisons to Stephen Curry in terms of his playing style. On December 19, Young tied (with three others) the then-NCAA single-game assists record with 22, while also recording 26 points in a 105–68 win against Northwestern State. (Note: Twenty-two assists is a feat shared by Syracuse's Sherman Douglas (1989), Southern's Avery Johnson (1988) and Charleston Southern's Tony Fairley (1987).) Throughout the season, Young rose from being a late first-round or a second-round pick to being a potential top-three pick for the 2018 NBA draft. He also garnered praise from both LeBron James and Stephen Curry for his season with Oklahoma. In January, his individual defense was rated as "poor". He had a season-high 43 points with 11 rebounds and seven assists in a 102–97 overtime win over TCU on January 13. On January 20, Young recorded a new career-high 48 points in an 83–81 overtime loss to rival Oklahoma State.

Young finished his freshman regular season leading the country in many statistics: assists (271), points (848), points per game (27.4), assists per game (8.7) and assist percentage (48.6%). The 848 points scored in the Big 12 would break the conference's record for most points scored by a freshman player, which was previously held by Kevin Durant and Michael Beasley. He became the only player to ever lead the NCAA in both points and assists in a single season.

On March 7, 2018, Young was announced as the winner of the Wayman Tisdale Award for National Freshman of the Year by the United States Basketball Writers Association (USBWA). At the end of the regular season for Oklahoma, Young was also named Big 12's Freshman of the Year and was a member of the All-Big 12's First Team. In addition, he was also brought up as a consensus member of the All-American First Team, which was named throughout multiple organizations. Young also joined 2018's top two selections Deandre Ayton and Marvin Bagley III as the first consensus All-American First-Team to have three freshman players be named there. On March 15, Young recorded 28 points, seven assists and five rebounds in an 83–78 overtime loss to seventh-seeded Rhode Island. He became the second freshman to record similar numbers of points in an NCAA tournament game, with Chris Paul being the first player back in 2004.

Following Oklahoma's loss in the 2018 NCAA men's basketball tournament, Young announced his intention to forgo his final three seasons of collegiate eligibility and declare for the 2018 NBA draft.

== Professional career ==
=== Atlanta Hawks (2018–2026) ===
==== 2018–19 season: All-Rookie honors ====
On June 21, 2018, Young was selected with the fifth overall pick by his hometown team the Dallas Mavericks in the 2018 NBA draft, but was traded to the Atlanta Hawks, along with a protected future first-round pick in exchange for the rights to the third overall pick Luka Dončić. On July 1, 2018, Young officially signed with the Hawks. On October 21, in the Hawks' third game of the season, Young finished with a season-high 35 points and 11 assists in a 133–111 win over the Cleveland Cavaliers. On November 19, Young finished with a then-career-high 17 assists, 25 points and three rebounds in a 127–119 loss to the Los Angeles Clippers. On February 25, 2019, Young scored a then-career-high 36 points and made career high eight three-pointers in a 119–111 loss to the Houston Rockets. On February 27, Young recorded 36 points and 10 assists in a 131–123 overtime win over the Minnesota Timberwolves. He then surpassed his season high two days later on March 1, putting up a then-career-high 49 points alongside 16 assists in a high-scoring 168–161 quadruple-overtime loss to the Chicago Bulls. On March 31, Young scored a game-winner and had 12 points and 16 assists against the first-seeded Milwaukee Bucks. He joined Dončić in being a unanimous selection to the 2019 NBA All-Rookie First Team.

==== 2019–20 season: first All-Star selection ====
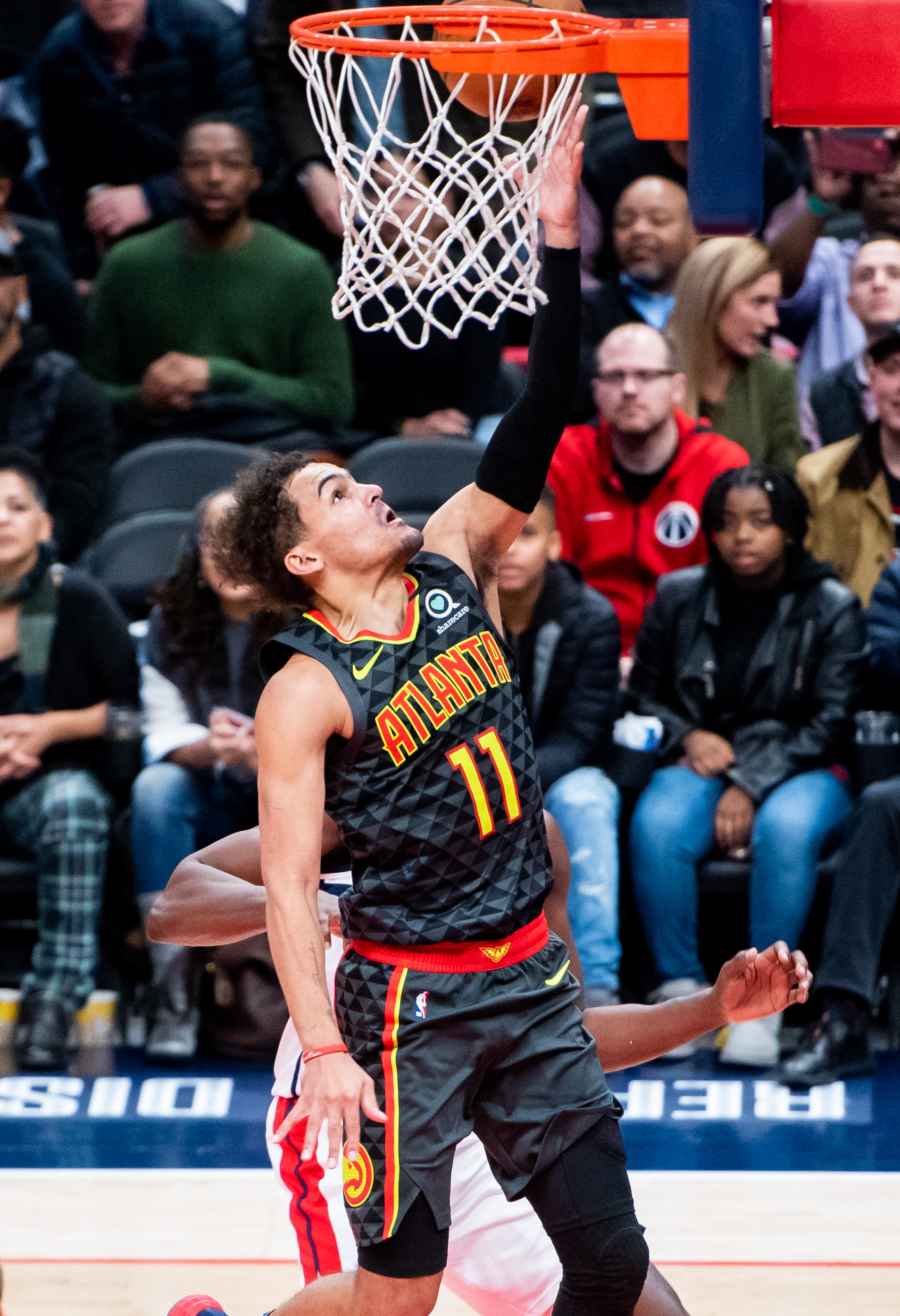
Young with the Hawks in January 2020

On October 24, 2019, Young scored 38 points in a 117–110 season-opening win against the Detroit Pistons. On November 29, Young scored 49 points, including 21 points in the fourth quarter, in a 105–104 overtime loss to the Indiana Pacers. On January 23, 2020, he was selected for the NBA All-Star selection as a backcourt starter. On January 26, Young recorded 45 points and 14 assists in a 152–133 win against the Washington Wizards. Young wore No. 8 in the first eight seconds of the game in memory of Kobe Bryant, just hours after his death in a California helicopter crash. Four days later, he posted 39 points and a career-high 18 assists en route to a 127–117 win over the Philadelphia 76ers. On February 9, Young registered 48 points and 13 assists in 47 minutes in a 140–135 double overtime win over the New York Knicks. On February 20, Young scored a career-high 50 points in a 129–124 win against the Miami Heat, hitting 8-of-15 three pointers. On February 19, 2020, Bleacher Report named Young the worst defensive point guard in the NBA.

==== 2020–21 season: Eastern Conference finals appearance ====
On December 23, 2020, Young put up 37 points, seven assists and six rebounds, in a 124–104 season-opening win over the Chicago Bulls. On May 23, 2021, he made his NBA playoff debut, posting 32 points, 7 rebounds and 10 assists against the New York Knicks, capping it off with a game-winning floater with 0.9 seconds left in regulation to lift the Hawks to a 107–105 victory in Game 1 of the first round. Young also joined LeBron James, Chris Paul, and Derrick Rose as the only players in league history to record 30 points and 10 assists in their playoff debuts. In a 109–106 victory over the Philadelphia 76ers in Game 5 of the conference semifinals, Young put up 39 points, seven assists, and three steals leading the Hawks to a 26-point comeback victory. In Game 7 of the conference semifinals, Young put up 21 points to lead the Hawks past the 76ers en route to their first Eastern Conference finals appearance since 2015. In Game 1 of the conference finals, Young dropped a playoff career-high 48 points, alongside 11 assists and seven rebounds in a 116–113 victory over the Milwaukee Bucks. Young missed Games 4 and 5 due to a bone bruise in his right foot. Young returned in Game 6, but the Hawks lost 118–107, ending their season.

On August 3, 2021, Young agreed to a five-year max extension with the Hawks with $172 million guaranteed and potentially up to $207 million.

==== 2021–22 season: first All-NBA selection ====
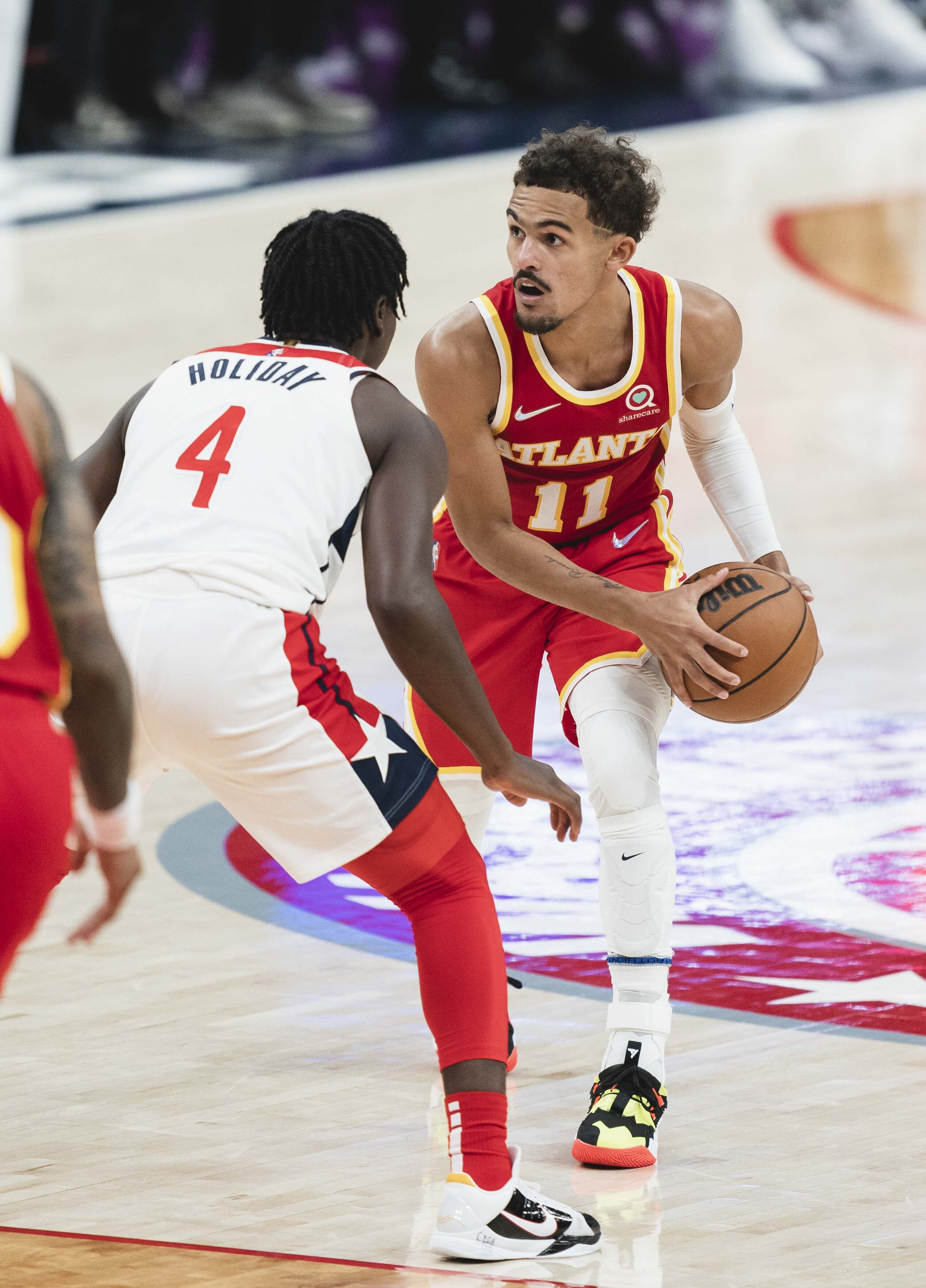
Young surveys the court while being guarded by Aaron Holiday of the Washington Wizards in 2021

On November 14, 2021, Young scored a then season-high 42 points, along with eight rebounds and 10 assists, to lead Atlanta to a 120–100 victory over the defending champion Milwaukee Bucks. On January 3, 2022, Young scored a career-high 56 points, along with 14 assists, in a 136–131 loss to the Portland Trail Blazers. From November 22 to January 7, Young had 17th consecutive 25-point games, breaking a tie with Dominique Wilkins for the franchise record.

On January 27, Young was selected for the 2022 NBA All-Star Game once again as a backcourt starter. On February 3, Young scored 43 points in a 124–115 win against the Phoenix Suns to end their 11-game winning streak. On February 26, Young scored 41 points and delivered 11 assists on 17-of-24 shooting from the field as Atlanta beat the Toronto Raptors 127–100; it was Young's tenth career game with at least 40 points and 10 assists, passing Michael Jordan for ninth most all-time. On March 13, Young scored 33 of his 47 points in the first half in a 131–128 win over the Indiana Pacers. The next day, Young registered 46 points, six rebounds, and 12 assists in a 122–113 win over the Trail Blazers, becoming the first player in the NBA this season to score 40-plus on back-to-back nights and the first to do so since Bradley Beal in February 2020. On March 22, Young scored 45 points and delivered 8 assists in a 117–111 win over the New York Knicks at the Madison Square Garden. At the conclusion of the regular season, Young became the second player in NBA history to lead the league in total points and assists in a season, joining Tiny Archibald.

On April 15, during the Hawks' 107–101 play-in tournament win over the Cleveland Cavaliers to secure the No. 8 seed in the 2022 NBA playoffs, Young logged 38 points and 9 assists. He scored 32 of his points in the second half. In Game 1 of the first round against the Miami Heat, Young scored a playoff career–low eight points on 1-for-12 shooting (0-for-7 from three-point range) and had more turnovers (six) than assists (four). His 8.3% shooting was tied for the worst field goal percentage of his career. The Hawks would go on to lose to the Heat in five games.

==== 2022–23 season: new backcourt mate ====
As Young entered his fifth NBA season, the Atlanta Hawks decided to pull off a trade receiving Dejounte Murray of the San Antonio Spurs in the process. The trade improved the Hawks' defense and reduced Young's offensive burden. His season began on October 19, 2022, against the Houston Rockets. In his first game, he put up 23 points and 13 assists. They went on to win that game 117–107 where his newly acquired teammate played his defensive role well racking up five steals. Five games later in the season, Young put up 42 points in a 115–123 loss against the Milwaukee Bucks. On November 25, Young scored a season-high 44 points in a 128–122 loss against the Houston Rockets.

On February 26, 2023, Young put up 34 points, eight assists, two steals and a buzzer-beating, game-winning jumpshot in a 129–127 win over the Brooklyn Nets. On April 7, Young scored 27 points and set a then-career-high 20 assists in 136–131 overtime loss against the Philadelphia 76ers. In game 3 of the Hawks' first-round playoff series against the Boston Celtics, Young put up 32 points, six rebounds, nine assists, one steal and two blocks in a 130–122 win. He joined Dejounte Murray as the first pair of Hawks teammates to each put up at least 25 points, five rebounds and five assists in a playoff game since Lenny Wilkens and Bill Bridges in 1966. In game 5 of the Hawks' first-round playoff series against the Boston Celtics, Young put up 38 points and 13 assists alongside a game-winning three-pointer in a 119–117 win. Atlanta would go on to lose to Boston in six games despite Young's 30-point and 10-assist outing in the 128–120 close-out loss in game 6.

==== 2023–24 season: franchise leader in three-pointers ====
On December 23, 2023, Young recorded 30 points and 13 assists in a 125–119 loss against the Memphis Grizzlies. It was his seventh consecutive game with at least 30 points and 10 assists, tying Oscar Robertson for the longest such streak in NBA history. Robertson set the record from December 1964 to January 1965. On November 30, 2023, Young scored a season-high 45 points with 14 assists in a 147–145 win against the San Antonio Spurs.

On February 6, 2024, Young was named to his third All-Star team, first since the 2021–22 NBA season, as an injury replacement for Julius Randle. On February 15, Young made his 1,051st career three-pointer to surpass Mookie Blaylock for the most three-pointers made in Hawks franchise history in a 122–99 loss to the Charlotte Hornets.

==== 2024–25 season: leading the NBA in assists ====
On October 23, 2024, in the Hawks' season-opener, Young recorded 30 points, 12 assists and five rebounds in a 120–116 win over the Brooklyn Nets. In the next game on October 25, Young had 38 points, 10 assists, eight rebounds and four steals in a 125–120 win over the Charlotte Hornets. He joined Oscar Robertson as the only players in NBA history to have back-to-back games with at least 30 points and 10 assists to start a season. On November 27, he had 20 points and a career-high 22 assists in a 135–124 win over the Cleveland Cavaliers. On December 6, Young put up 31 points and 20 assists, alongside a game-winning three-pointer, in a 134–132 overtime win over the Los Angeles Lakers. He became the first player in NBA history to have a game with 30-plus points, 20-plus assists and 5-plus three-pointers. Young also became the 11th player in NBA history to have a game with 30 points and 20 assists.

On January 7, 2025, seconds after Collin Sexton made a game-tying three, Young made a half-court game-winning three-point heave at the buzzer to lift Atlanta over the Utah Jazz 124–121 and cap off a 24-point, 20-assist performance. It was his third 20–20 game of the season. He became the first player to record that many in a season since John Stockton in 1989–90. On January 14, Young scored a season-high 43 points in a 122–117 win over the Phoenix Suns. Young finished the season leading the NBA in assists per game with a career-high 11.6 and also set a franchise record for total assists in a season with 880.

==== 2025–26 season: injury and turmoil with Atlanta ====
On October 29, 2025, Young departed a game against the Brooklyn Nets when teammate Mouhamed Gueye fell into his leg after being shoved by Nets forward Noah Clowney. Two days later, he was ruled out for at least four weeks after being diagnosed with a sprained MCL in his right knee. On December 18, Young returned from a 22-game absence due to a sprained right MCL and recorded eight points and 10 assists in a 133–126 loss to the Charlotte Hornets.

=== Washington Wizards (2026–present) ===
On January 9, 2026, Young was traded mid–game to the Washington Wizards in exchange for CJ McCollum and Corey Kispert. He was spotted giving thanks and chatting with the staff and players before walking off into the tunnel, officially ending his time with the Hawks. With the Wizards, Young changed his number from 11, retired by Washington in honor of Elvin Hayes, to number 3. On March 5, Young made his Wizards debut, putting up 12 points and six assists in 19 minutes played in a 122–112 loss to the Utah Jazz. He made five starts for Washington, recording averages of 15.2 points, 3.0 rebounds, and 6.2 assists. On April 7, it was announced that Young would miss the remainder of the year due to low back pain and a right quad contusion.

On June 17, 2026, Young declined a $48.97 million player option for the 2026–27 NBA season and became a free agent. On June 22, Young signed a four-year, $212 million contract to return to the Wizards.

== Awards and honors ==
NBA

- 4× NBA All-Star: 2020, 2022, 2024, 2025
- All-NBA Third Team: 2022
- NBA All-Rookie First Team: 2019
- NBA assists leader: 2025
- NBA Cup All-Tournament Team: 2024

USA Basketball

- FIBA Americas U18 Championship gold medalist: 2016

NCAA

- Consensus first-team All-American: 2018
- Wayman Tisdale Award: 2018
- NCAA scoring champion: 2018
- NCAA assists leader: 2018
- First-team All-Big 12: 2018
- Big 12 Freshman of the Year: 2018

== Career statistics ==
Legend
GP	Games played	GS	Games started	MPG	Minutes per game
FG%	Field goal percentage	3P%	3-point field goal percentage	FT%	Free throw percentage
RPG	Rebounds per game	APG	Assists per game	SPG	Steals per game
BPG	Blocks per game	PPG	Points per game	**Bold**	Career high
*	Led the league

=== NBA ===
==== Regular season ====
Year	Team	GP	GS	MPG	FG%	3P%	FT%	RPG	APG	SPG	BPG	PPG
2018–19	Atlanta	**81**	**81**	30.9	.418	.324	.829	3.7	8.1	.9	**.2**	19.1
2019–20	Atlanta	60	60	35.3	.437	.361	.860	**4.3**	9.3	1.1	.1	**29.6**
2020–21	Atlanta	63	63	33.7	.438	.343	.886	3.9	9.4	.8	**.2**	25.3
2021–22	Atlanta	76	76	34.9	.460	.382	**.904**	3.7	9.7	.9	.1	28.4
2022–23	Atlanta	73	73	34.8	.429	.335	.886	3.0	10.2	1.1	.1	26.2
2023–24	Atlanta	54	54	**36.0**	.430	.373	.855	2.8	10.8	**1.3**	**.2**	25.7
2024–25	Atlanta	76	76	**36.0**	.411	.340	.875	3.1	**11.6***	1.2	**.2**	24.2
2025–26	Atlanta	10	10	28.0	.415	.305	.863	1.5	8.9	1.0	.1	19.3
2025–26	Washington	5	5	20.8	**.595**	**.429**	.708	3.0	6.2	.6	**.2**	15.2
Career		498	498	34.1	.433	.352	.872	3.4	9.8	1.0	.2	25.1
All-Star		4	2	15.1	.382	.273	—	2.5	8.5	.5	.0	8.0

==== Playoffs ====
Year	Team	GP	GS	MPG	FG%	3P%	FT%	RPG	APG	SPG	BPG	PPG
2021	Atlanta	**16**	**16**	37.7	**.418**	.313	**.866**	2.8	9.5	1.3	.0	28.8
2022	Atlanta	5	5	37.3	.319	.184	.788	**5.0**	6.0	.6	.0	15.4
2023	Atlanta	6	6	**38.3**	.403	**.333**	.860	3.7	**10.2**	**1.7**	**.7**	**29.2**
Career		27	27	37.8	.402	.297	.852	3.4	9.0	1.2	.1	26.4

=== College ===
Year	Team	GP	GS	MPG	FG%	3P%	FT%	RPG	APG	SPG	BPG	PPG
2017–18	Oklahoma	32	32	35.4	.423	.361	.861	3.9	8.7*	1.7	.3	27.4*

== Personal life ==
Young started dating Shelby Miller in 2017, and they married on July 22, 2023, after a 19-month engagement. Young and Miller had a son in June 2022, and a daughter in November 2023. Young is a Christian.

Young was featured in the second season of the Young Hollywood original docu-series Rookie on the Rise. The series followed Young during his first year in the NBA.

In August 2019, Young was named an Honorary Board Member at The Children's Center Rehabilitation Hospital in Oklahoma City. In November 2023, he had a street named after him, Trae Young Drive, outside the Young Family Athletic Center in his hometown.

On March 31, 2025, Young joined his alma mater, the University of Oklahoma, as the team's assistant general manager.

== See also ==
- List of NBA career free throw percentage leaders
- List of NBA single-season assists per game leaders
- List of NCAA Division I men's basketball players with 20 or more assists in a game
