= Marvin Bagley III =

American basketball player (born 1999)

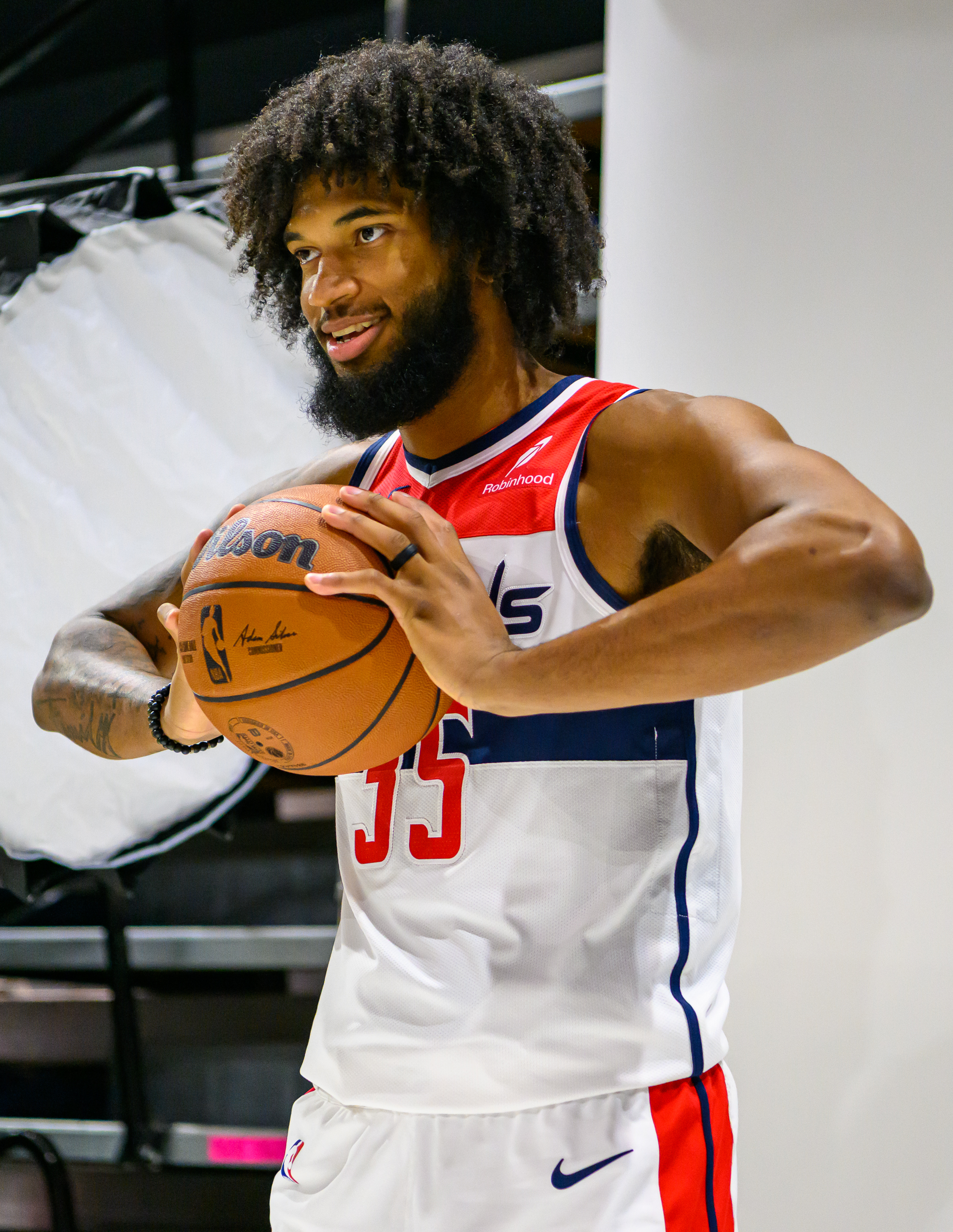
- Bagley with the Washington Wizards in 2025

No. 3 – Denver Nuggets
- Position: Power forward / center
- League: NBA

Personal information
- Born: March 14, 1999 (age 27) Tempe, Arizona, U.S.
- Listed height: 6 ft 10 in (2.08 m)
- Listed weight: 235 lb (107 kg)

Career information
- High school: Corona del Sol (Tempe, Arizona); Hillcrest Prep (Phoenix, Arizona); Sierra Canyon (Chatsworth, California)
- College: Duke (2017–2018)
- NBA draft: 2018: 1st round, 2nd overall pick
- Drafted by: Sacramento Kings
- Playing career: 2018–present

Career history
- 2018–2022: Sacramento Kings
- 2022–2024: Detroit Pistons
- 2024–2025: Washington Wizards
- 2025: Memphis Grizzlies
- 2025–2026: Washington Wizards
- 2026: Dallas Mavericks
- 2026–present: Denver Nuggets

Career highlights
- NBA All-Rookie First Team (2019); Consensus first-team All-American (2018); Pete Newell Big Man Award (2018); NABC Freshman of the Year (2018); ACC Player of the Year (2018); First-team All-ACC (2018); ACC Rookie of the Year (2018)
- Stats at NBA.com
- Stats at Basketball Reference

Marvin Bagley III (born March 14, 1999) is an American professional basketball player for the Denver Nuggets of the National Basketball Association (NBA). He played college basketball for the Duke Blue Devils and was a 2018 Consensus All-American. Bagley was selected with the second overall pick by the Sacramento Kings in the 2018 NBA draft. At the end of the 2018–19 season, he was named to the NBA All-Rookie First Team. After spending three and a half seasons with the Kings, he was traded to the Detroit Pistons at the 2022 trade deadline. He played for nearly three seasons with Detroit before being traded to the Washington Wizards in 2024 and then traded again to the Memphis Grizzlies during the 2025 trade deadline.

== High school career ==
Bagley attended Corona del Sol High School in Tempe, Arizona, as a freshman, where he won the state championship and was named National Freshman Basketball Player of the Year by MaxPreps. His sophomore year, he transferred to Hillcrest Prep in Phoenix, Arizona, where he was teammates with future #1 pick Deandre Ayton. He left Hillcrest Prep in November 2015. In January 2016, he enrolled in Sierra Canyon School in Chatsworth, California. He was ruled ineligible to play his first year at Sierra Canyon due to California Interscholastic Federation (CIF) rules. In his last season for Sierra Canyon, he averaged 24.9 points per game and 10.1 rebounds per game. He would be named for the All-USA Today First Team in 2017. He would graduate a year early and reclassify into the 2017 class.

=== Recruiting ===
Bagley was rated as a five-star recruit throughout his high school career and was formerly ranked as the top player in the 2018 class before his reclassification. Bagley played for WACG (We All Can Go), in the EYBL circuit, with known players such as Darius Garland and Tray Boyd III. During this time, Bagley and WACG were selected to play in the EYBL Peach Jam Tournament; Bagley picked up major awards and recognition with alongside help from Garland and Boyd III. Bagley was ranked the No.1 overall recruit and No.1 power forward in the 2017 high school class. His first college basketball scholarship offer came from Northern Arizona University when he was 14.

Before beginning what would have been his senior year of high school, Bagley reclassified into the Class of 2017. On August 14, 2017, he announced that he successfully reclassified as a graduate from Sierra Canyon and was eligible to play college basketball for Duke University during the 2017–18 NCAA Division I men's basketball season. thus allowing him to enter the 2018 NBA draft as an early entry in the collegiate level. He graduated from Sierra Canyon on September 1, 2017, and went to Duke after finishing high school academics a week later.

College recruiting
Name	Hometown	School	Height	Weight	Commit date
Marvin Bagley III; PF	Phoenix, AZ	Sierra Canyon School (CA)	6 ft 10 in (2.08 m)	220 lb (100 kg)	Aug 14, 2017
Marvin Bagley III; PF	Recruit ratings: Scout: Rivals: 247Sports: ESPN: (98)				
Overall recruit ranking: Scout: 1 Rivals: 2 247Sports: 1 ESPN: 1
Note: In many cases, Scout, Rivals, 247Sports, On3, and ESPN may conflict in their listings of height and weight.; In these cases, the average was taken. ESPN grades are on a 100-point scale.; Sources: "Duke 2017 Basketball Commitments". Rivals.; "2017 Duke Blue Devils Recruiting Class". ESPN.; "2017 Team Ranking". Rivals.

== College career ==
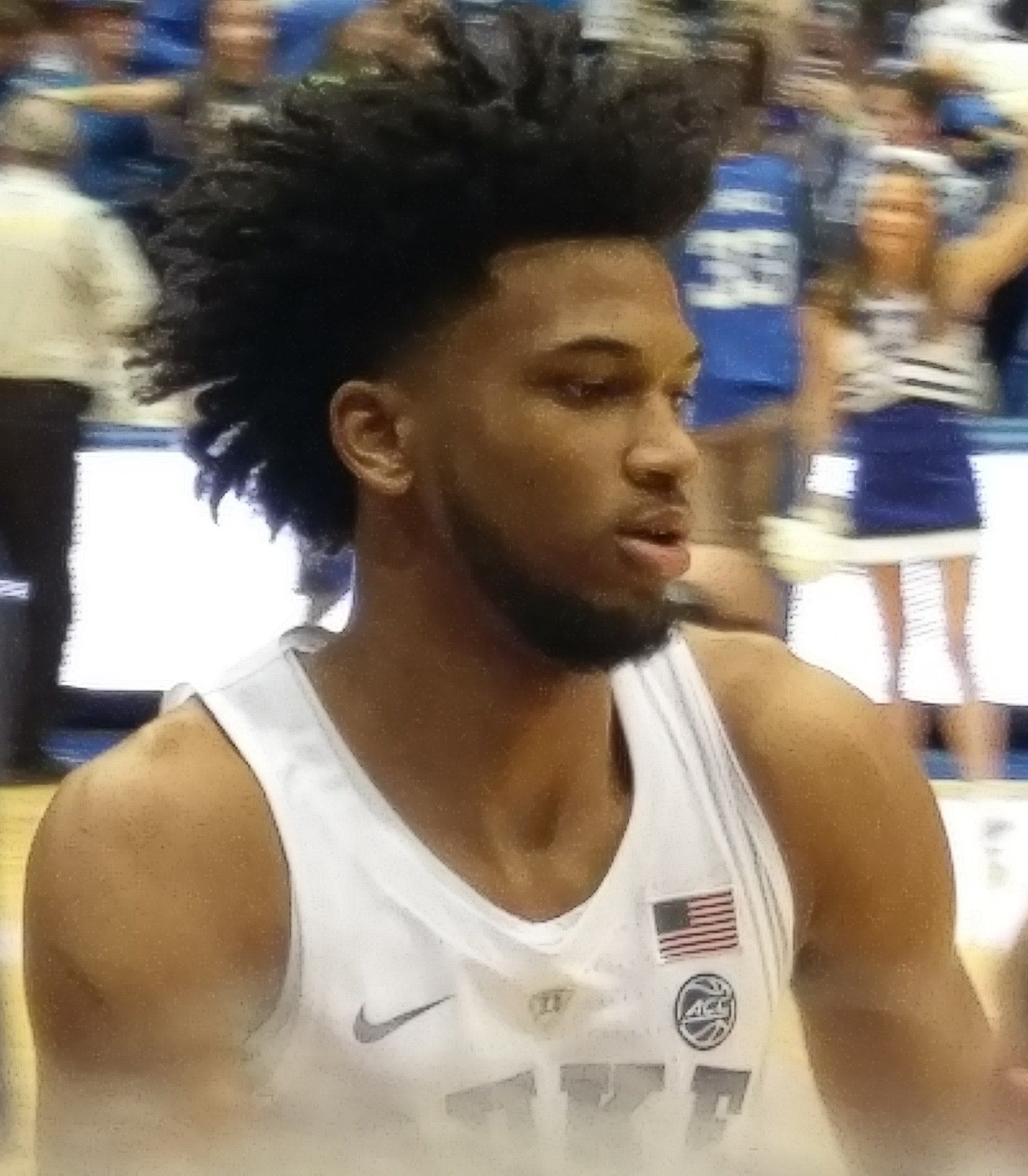
Bagley with Duke in 2018

Bagley made his Duke debut on November 10, 2017, recording 25 points and 10 rebounds in a win over Elon. On November 13, 2017, Bagley was named ACC rookie of the week. On November 24, Bagley scored 34 points and made a freshman record 15 rebounds for Duke as they defeated Texas 85–78 in overtime. He tied the freshman record for rebounds in the next game four days later and scored 30 points in an 87–84 win over Florida, It was the first time a Duke player did so since the 1960s. On November 29, 2017, Bagley tallied 23 points and 10 rebounds in a 91–81 victory against Indiana. On December 30, Bagley recorded 32 points and a record 21 rebounds in a 100–93 win over Florida State. On December 4, 2017, Bagley earned ACC rookie of the week honors for the third time. With 30 points and 11 rebounds in an 89–71 win over Wake Forest on January 13, 2018, he became the ACC's record holder for most 30-point, 10-rebound double-doubles in a season. On January 15, 2018, Bagley earned his fifth ACC rookie of the week honor. On March 3, 2018, he scored 21 points and 15 rebounds in a 74–64 win over Duke rival North Carolina.

At the end of the regular season, Bagley was named both the ACC's Rookie of the Year and Player of the Year, as well as a member of the All-ACC first team. He was also named a consensus member of the All-American First-Team by multiple organizations. In addition to that, Bagley joined Deandre Ayton and Trae Young as the most freshmen players to join the consensus All-American First Team in a season.

Following Duke's loss in the 2018 NCAA men's basketball tournament, Bagley announced his intention to forgo his final three seasons of collegiate eligibility and declare for the 2018 NBA draft.

== Professional career ==
=== Sacramento Kings (2018–2022) ===
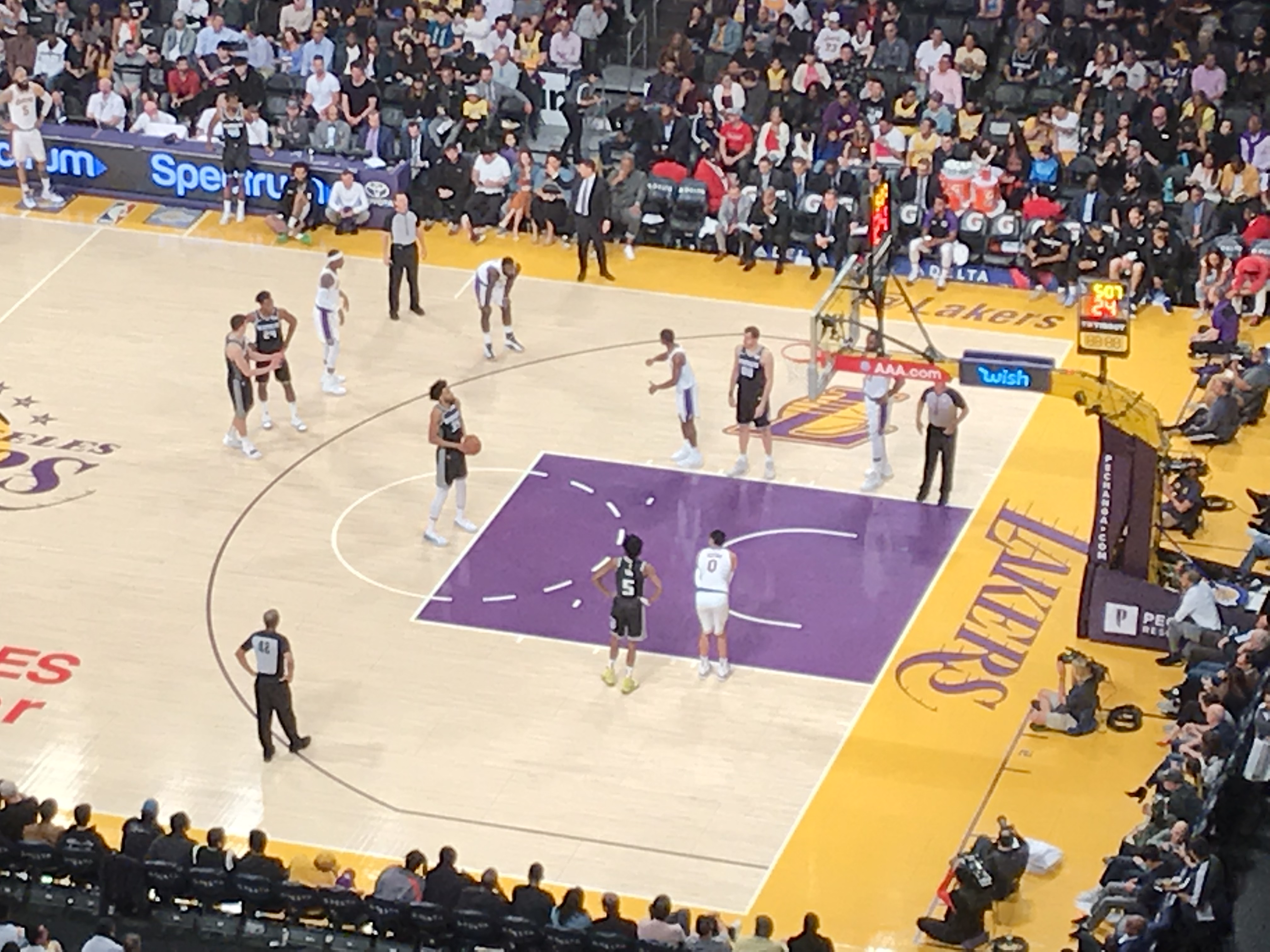
Bagley taking a free throw against the Lakers in March 2019

On June 21, 2018, Bagley was selected second overall in the 2018 NBA draft by the Sacramento Kings, behind his former high school teammate Deandre Ayton. On July 1, 2018, he signed a rookie scale contract with the Kings.

Bagley made his professional debut with Sacramento on October 17, 2018, with 6 points and 5 rebounds in only 12 minutes coming off the bench in a 123–117 loss to the Utah Jazz. In his next game two days later, Bagley recorded 19 points, 8 rebounds, 3 assists and 3 blocks in a 149–129 loss to the New Orleans Pelicans. On November 24, Bagley had a double-double of 20 points and 17 rebounds coming off the bench in a 117–116 loss to the Golden State Warriors. During their second match against Golden State on December 14, he sprained his left knee, which sidelined him for 11 games. On March 19, 2019, Bagley scored a career-high 28 points off the bench in a 123–121 loss to the Brooklyn Nets, in which the Kings entered the fourth quarter with a 25-point lead.

On October 24, 2019, Bagley was diagnosed to have a non-displaced fracture in his right thumb and was expected to be sidelined for about four to six weeks. Instead, he only played 13 games before the season was suspended due to the COVID-19 pandemic on March 11, 2020. On July 19, 2020, he sustained a right foot injury during practice, and was expected to miss the remainder of the 2019–20 season.

On December 4, 2020, the Sacramento Kings announced that they had exercised their option on Bagley.

Before the start of the 2021–22 season, the Kings informed Bagley that he would not be part of the rotation after not reaching an agreement on a contract extension.

=== Detroit Pistons (2022–2024) ===
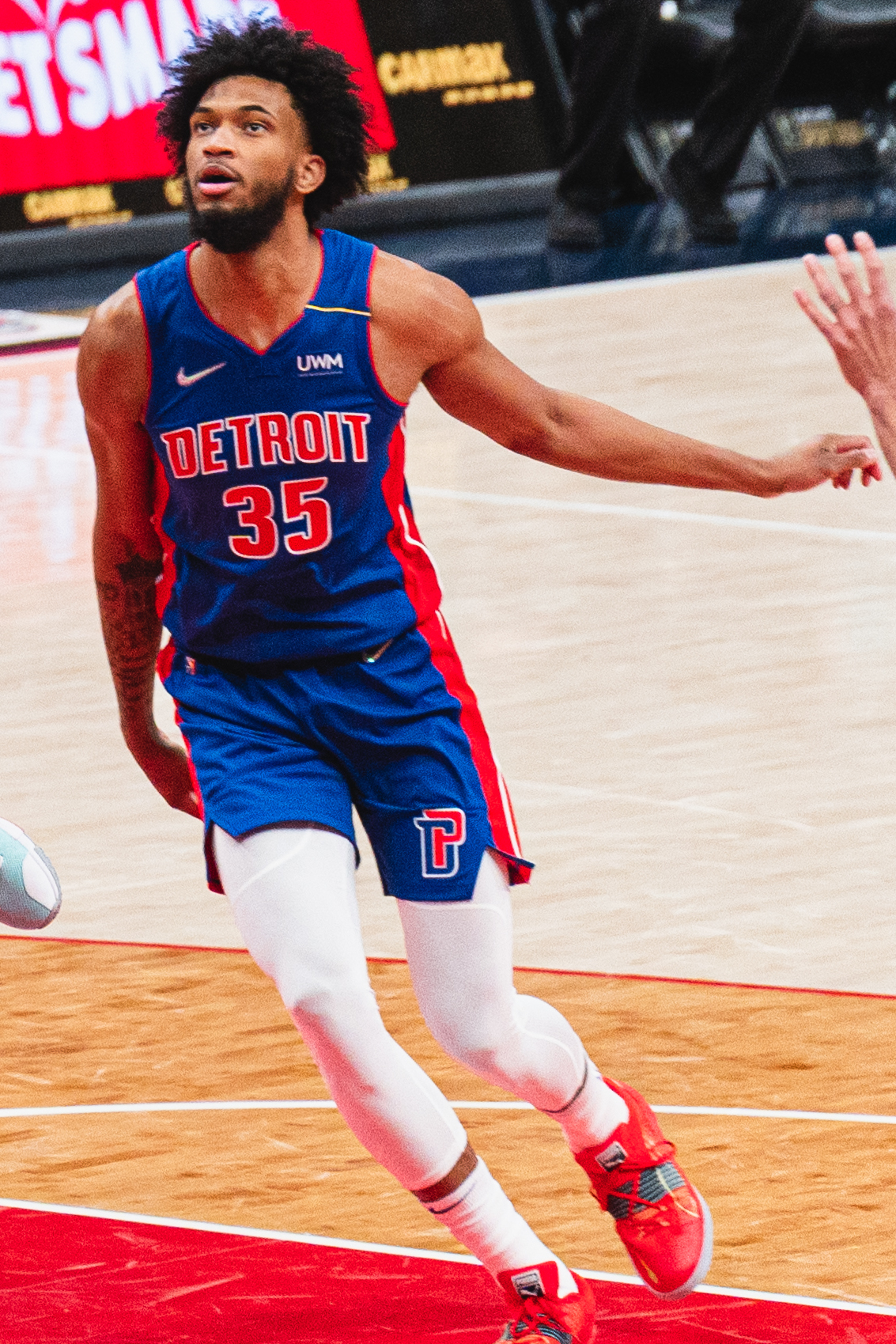
Bagley with the Pistons in 2022

On February 10, 2022, Bagley was traded to the Detroit Pistons as part of a four-team trade that sent Donte DiVincenzo, Josh Jackson and Trey Lyles to the Kings. On February 14, Bagley made his Pistons debut, recording 10 points, eight rebounds and one assist in a 103–94 loss to the Washington Wizards.

On July 6, 2022, Bagley re-signed with the Pistons on a three-year, $37.5 million contract. On February 25, 2023, after missing over a month with a hand injury, Bagley scored 21 points and grabbed 18 rebounds during a 95–91 loss to the Toronto Raptors.

=== Washington Wizards (2024–2025) ===
On January 14, 2024, Bagley was traded to the Washington Wizards, along with Isaiah Livers and future draft considerations in exchange for Danilo Gallinari and Mike Muscala. In 24 games (15 starts) for Washington, he averaged 13.3 points, 8.1 rebounds and 1.2 assists.

Bagley played in 19 games for the Wizards during the 2024–25 NBA season, averaging 4.9 points, 2.9 rebounds and 0.4 assists.

=== Memphis Grizzlies (2025) ===
On February 6, 2025, Bagley was traded at the trade deadline to the Memphis Grizzlies, along with Johnny Davis and two second-round picks, in a three-team deal involving the Sacramento Kings who received Jake LaRavia while the Wizards acquired Marcus Smart, Alex Len, Colby Jones and a first-round pick.

On April 20, during the first round of the 2025 NBA playoffs and his playoff debut, Bagley scored 17 points on 8–8 shooting from the field, alongside five rebounds and two steals, in an 131–80 loss to the Oklahoma City Thunder. The Thunder eliminated the Grizzlies in a 4–0 sweep.

=== Return to Washington (2025–2026) ===
On July 11, 2025, Bagley signed a one-year deal to return to the Washington Wizards. Bagley made 38 appearances (including eight starts) for Washington during the 2025–26 NBA season, recording averages of 10.1 points, 5.7 rebounds, and 1.5 assists.

=== Dallas Mavericks (2026) ===
On February 5, 2026, Bagley was traded to the Dallas Mavericks in a three-team trade involving the Charlotte Hornets. On February 7, Bagley made his debut with the Mavericks, scoring a double double for them, Bagley logged in 16 points, 12 rebounds, and four blocks in 24 minutes of playtime against the San Antonio Spurs. On March 27, he recorded a season-high 26 points, nine rebounds, and three assists in a 100–93 victory over the Portland Trail Blazers. Bagley made 22 total appearances (including four starts) for the Mavericks, recording averages of 11.0 points, 6.8 rebounds, and 1.3 assists.

=== Denver Nuggets (2026–present) ===
On July 16, 2026, Bagley signed a one-year contract with the Denver Nuggets.

== Career statistics ==
Legend
GP	Games played	GS	Games started	MPG	Minutes per game
FG%	Field goal percentage	3P%	3-point field goal percentage	FT%	Free throw percentage
RPG	Rebounds per game	APG	Assists per game	SPG	Steals per game
BPG	Blocks per game	PPG	Points per game	**Bold**	Career high

=== NBA ===
==== Regular season ====
Year	Team	GP	GS	MPG	FG%	3P%	FT%	RPG	APG	SPG	BPG	PPG
2018–19	Sacramento	**62**	4	25.3	.504	.313	.691	7.6	1.0	.5	**1.0**	**14.9**
2019–20	Sacramento	13	6	25.7	.467	.182	.806	7.5	.8	.5	.9	14.2
2020–21	Sacramento	43	**42**	25.9	.504	.343	.575	7.4	1.0	.5	.5	14.1
2021–22	Sacramento	30	17	21.9	.463	.242	.745	7.2	.6	.3	.4	9.3
2021–22	Detroit	18	8	**27.2**	.555	.229	.593	6.8	1.1	**.7**	.4	14.6
2022–23	Detroit	42	25	23.6	.529	.288	.750	6.4	.9	.5	.7	12.0
2023–24	Detroit	26	10	18.4	.591	.167	**.820**	4.5	1.0	.2	.5	10.2
2023–24	Washington	24	15	24.0	.581	.471	.708	**8.1**	1.2	.6	.8	13.3
2024–25	Washington	19	1	8.7	.535	.200	.652	2.9	.4	.4	.3	4.4
2024–25	Memphis	12	1	8.3	.486	.111	.667	2.3	.3	.2	.3	3.6
2025–26	Washington	38	8	19.2	**.626**	.421	.711	5.7	**1.5**	.5	.7	10.1
2025–26	Dallas	22	4	21.4	.606	**.485**	.553	6.8	1.3	.4	.7	11.0
Career		349	141	22.0	.531	.308	.685	6.5	1.0	.5	.6	11.8

==== Playoffs ====
Year	Team	GP	GS	MPG	FG%	3P%	FT%	RPG	APG	SPG	BPG	PPG
2025	Memphis	2	0	14.0	.889	1.000	–	3.0	.0	1.0	.5	8.5
Career		2	0	14.0	.889	1.000	–	3.0	.0	1.0	.5	8.5

=== College ===
Year	Team	GP	GS	MPG	FG%	3P%	FT%	RPG	APG	SPG	BPG	PPG
2017–18	Duke	33	32	33.9	.614	.397	.627	11.1	1.5	.8	.9	21.0

== Personal life ==
Bagley has two younger brothers: Marcus and Martray. His father, Marvin Jr., played college football at North Carolina A&T, as well as with the Arizona Rattlers professionally. Marvin Jr. met his wife, Tracy Caldwell, while he was playing with the Rattlers in the Arena Football League. Marvin Jr. and Caldwell married on June 21, 2025. Marvin Jr. currently coaches AAU basketball for the Nike Phamily. Bagley's younger brother Marcus played at Arizona State University. While living in the Los Angeles area, Bagley volunteered at Hoops with Heart, a non-profit organization in the city that benefits underprivileged youth. He is also the grandson of former Olympic and professional basketball player Jumpin' Joe Caldwell, who was the number two overall pick in the 1964 NBA draft.

Outside of basketball, Bagley is a rapper and hip-hop artist who writes his own raps. His album Big Jreams was released on August 24, 2019, featuring other artists including Iman Shumpert and Famous Los.

== See also ==
- List of second-generation NBA players
