= 2018 NCAA Men's Basketball All-Americans =

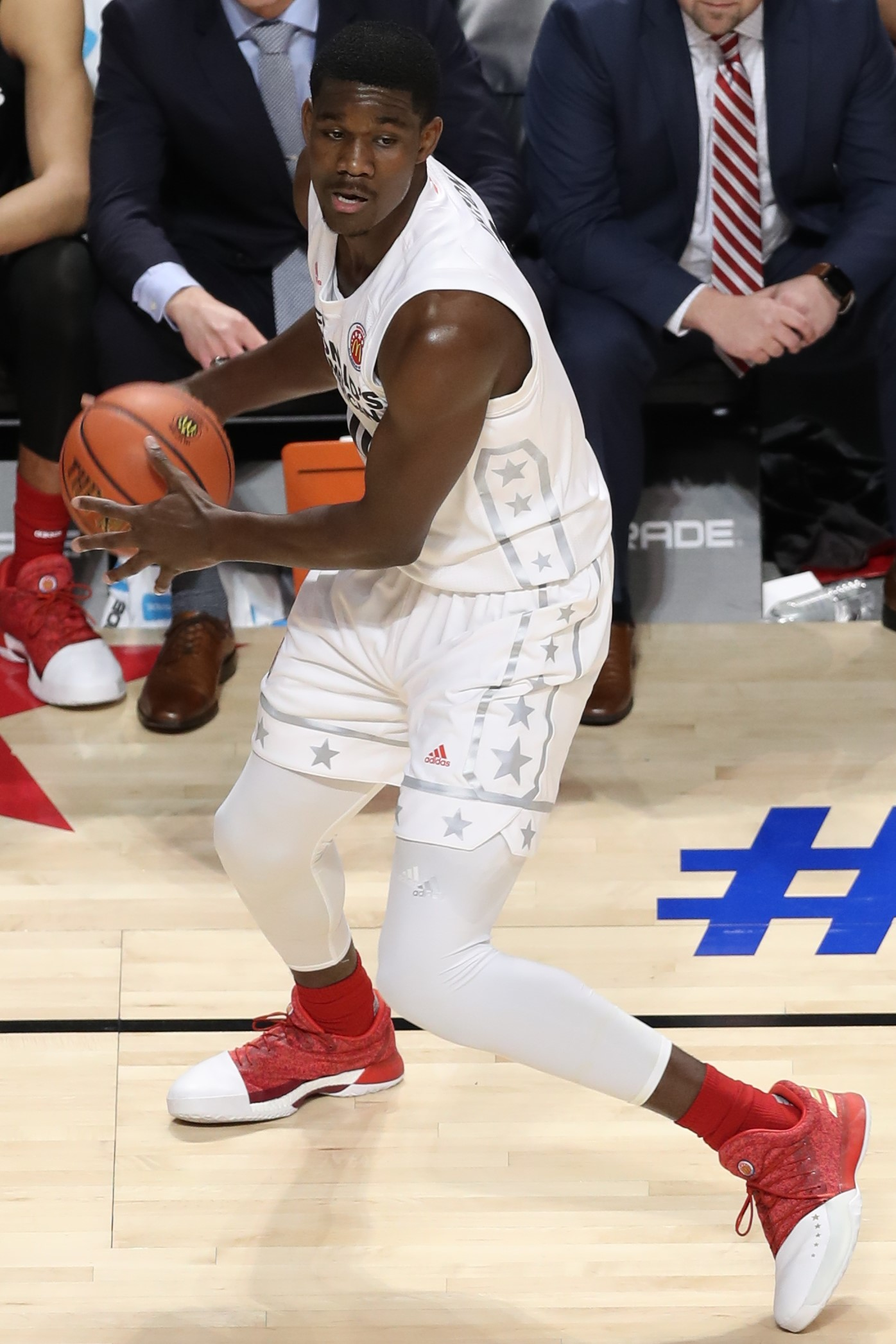
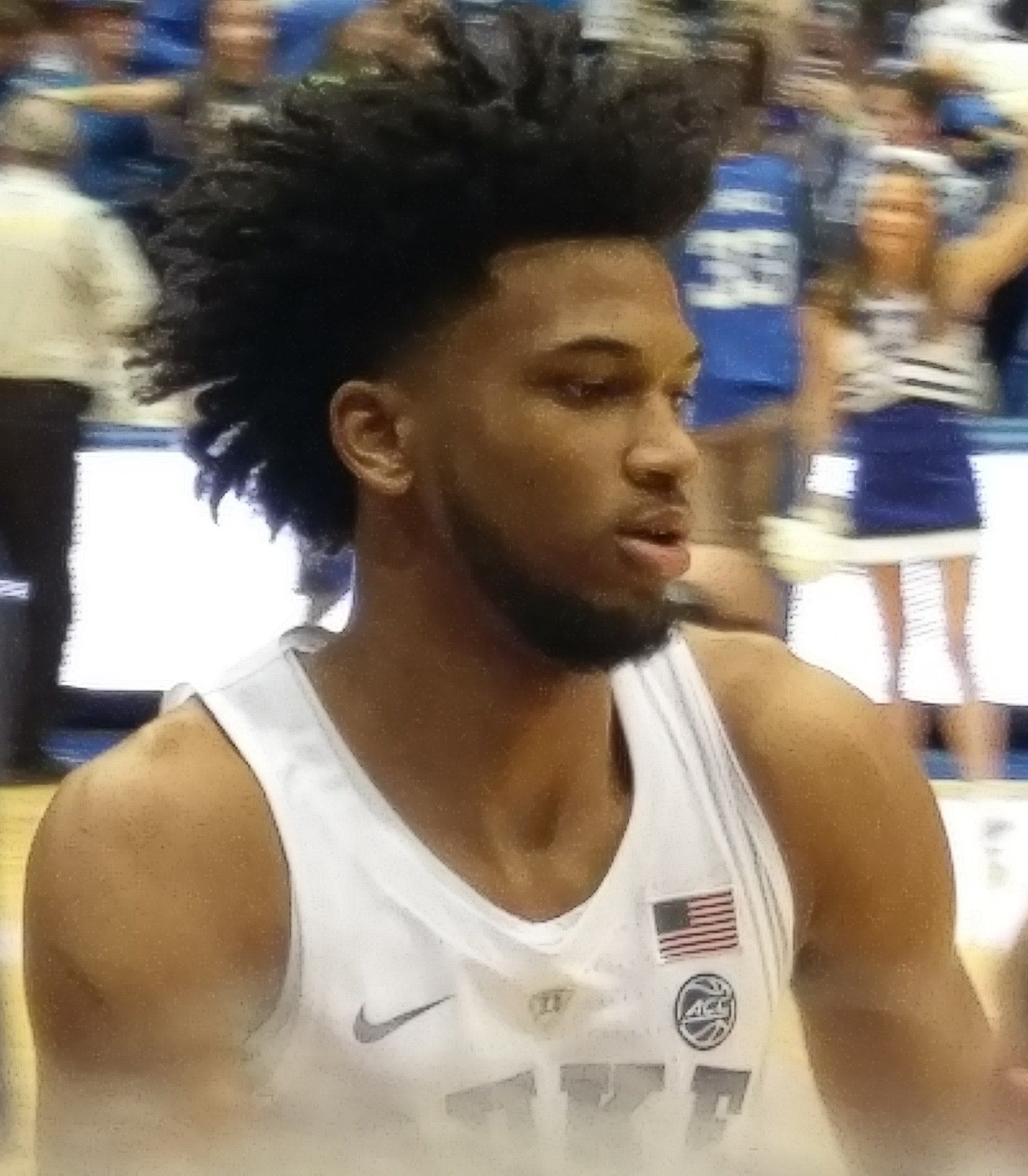
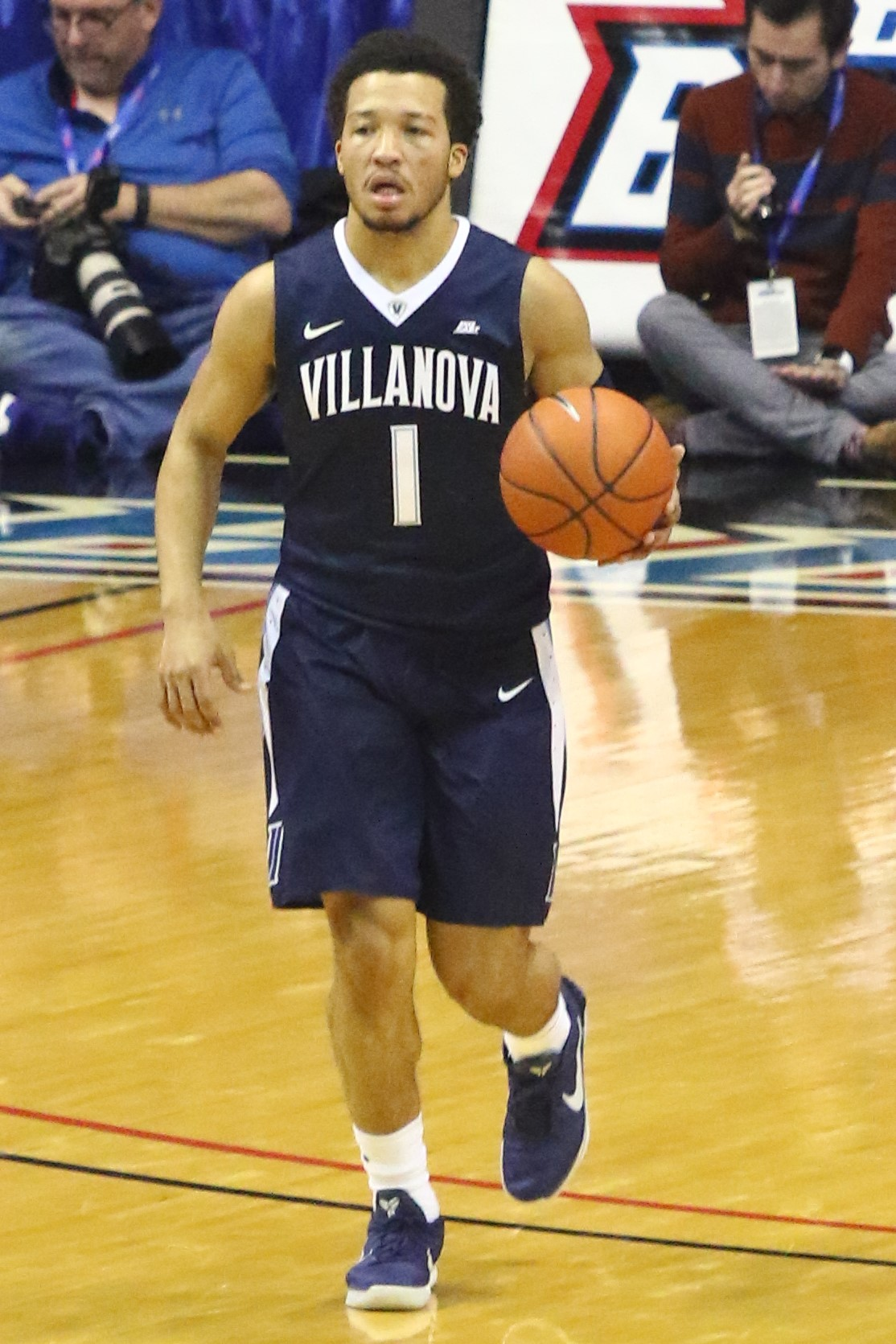
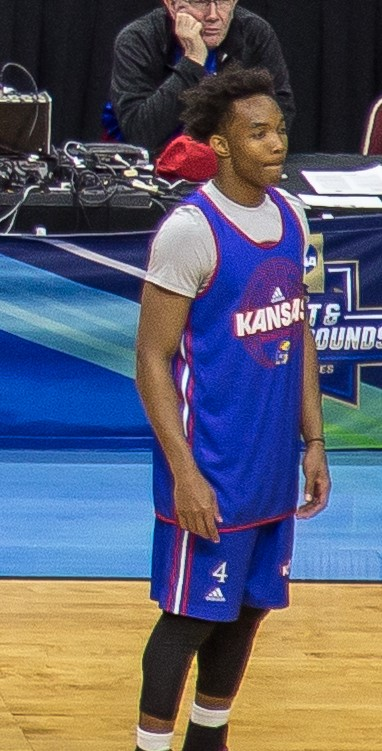
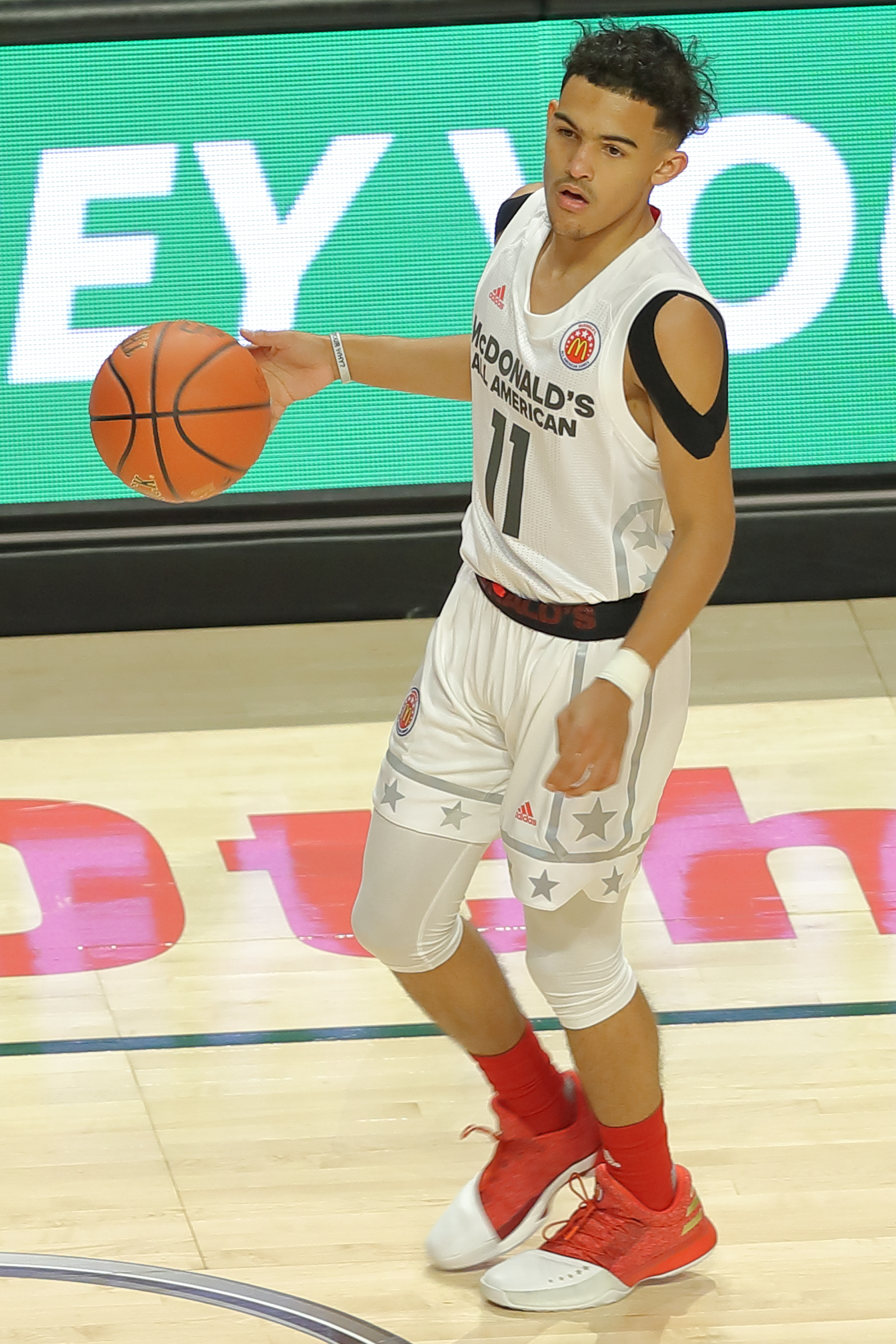
- The 2018 consensus first team. Clockwise from top left: Ayton, Bagley, Young, Graham, Brunson.
- Awarded for: 2017–18 NCAA Division I men's basketball season

An All-American team is an honorary sports team composed of the best amateur players of a specific season for each team position—who in turn are given the honorific "All-America" and typically referred to as "All-American athletes", or simply "All-Americans". Although the honorees generally do not compete together as a unit, the term is used in U.S. team sports to refer to players who are selected by members of the national media. Walter Camp selected the first All-America team in the early days of American football in 1889. The 2018 NCAA Men's Basketball All-Americans are honorary lists that include All-American selections from the Associated Press (AP), the United States Basketball Writers Association (USBWA), the Sporting News (TSN), and the National Association of Basketball Coaches (NABC) for the 2017–18 NCAA Division I men's basketball season. All selectors choose at least a first and second 5-man team. The NABC, TSN and AP choose third teams, while AP also lists honorable mention selections.

The Consensus 2018 College Basketball All-American team is determined by aggregating the results of the four major All-American teams as determined by the National Collegiate Athletic Association (NCAA). Since United Press International was replaced by TSN in 1997, the four major selectors have been the aforementioned ones. AP has been a selector since 1948, NABC since 1957 and USBWA since 1960. To earn "consensus" status, a player must win honors based on a point system computed from the four different all-America teams. The point system consists of three points for first team, two points for second team and one point for third team. No honorable mention or fourth team or lower are used in the computation. The top five totals plus ties are the first team and the next five plus ties are the second team.

Although the aforementioned lists are used to determine consensus honors, there are numerous other All-American lists. The ten finalists for the John Wooden Award are described as Wooden All-Americans. The ten finalists for the Senior CLASS Award are described as Senior All-Americans. Other All-American lists include those determined by USA Today, Fox Sports, Yahoo! Sports and many others. The scholar-athletes selected by College Sports Information Directors of America (CoSIDA) are termed Academic All-Americans.

== 2018 Consensus All-America team ==
PG – Point guard
SG – Shooting guard
PF – Power forward
SF – Small forward
C – Center

Consensus First Team
Player	Position	Class	Team
Deandre Ayton	PF/C	Freshman	Arizona
Marvin Bagley III	PF	Freshman	Duke
Jalen Brunson	PG	Junior	Villanova
Devonte' Graham	PG	Senior	Kansas
Trae Young	PG	Freshman	Oklahoma

Consensus Second Team
Player	Position	Class	Team
Keita Bates-Diop	SF	Junior	Ohio State
Trevon Bluiett	SG	Senior	Xavier
Miles Bridges	SF	Sophomore	Michigan State
Jevon Carter	PG	Senior	West Virginia
Keenan Evans	PG	Senior	Texas Tech
Jock Landale	C	Senior	Saint Mary's

== Individual All-America teams ==
=== By player ===
Player	School	AP	USBWA	NABC	SN	CP	Notes
Deandre Ayton	Arizona	1	1	1	1	12	
Marvin Bagley III	Duke	1	1	1	1	12	
Jalen Brunson	Villanova	1	1	1	1	12	AP Player of the Year, Oscar Robertson Trophy, Sporting News Player of the Year
Devonte' Graham	Kansas	1	1	1	1	12	
Trae Young	Oklahoma	1	1	1	1	12	USBWA National Freshman of the Year
Keita Bates-Diop	Ohio State	2	2	2	2	8	
Trevon Bluiett	Xavier	2	2	2	2	8	
Miles Bridges	Michigan State	2	2	2	2	8	
Jock Landale	Saint Mary's	2	2	2	2	8	
Jevon Carter	West Virginia	2		3	2	5	Academic All-American of the Year, Senior CLASS Award
Keenan Evans	Texas Tech	3	2	3	3	5	
Carsen Edwards	Purdue	3		2	3	4	
Mikal Bridges	Villanova	3		3	3	3	
Kyle Guy	Virginia	3		3		2	
Luke Maye	North Carolina	3			3	2	
Joel Berry II	North Carolina			3		1	
Aaron Holiday	UCLA				3	1	

=== By team ===
All-America Team
All-America Team	First team		Second team		Third team	
All-America Team	Player	School	Player	School	Player	School
Associated Press	Deandre Ayton	Arizona	Keita Bates-Diop	Ohio State	Mikal Bridges	Villanova
Associated Press	Marvin Bagley III	Duke	Trevon Bluiett	Xavier	Carsen Edwards	Purdue
Associated Press	Jalen Brunson	Villanova	Miles Bridges	Michigan State	Keenan Evans	Texas Tech
Associated Press	Devonte' Graham	Kansas	Jevon Carter	West Virginia	Kyle Guy	Virginia
Associated Press	Trae Young	Oklahoma	Jock Landale	Saint Mary's	Luke Maye	North Carolina
USBWA	Deandre Ayton	Arizona	Keita Bates-Diop	Ohio State	No third team	
USBWA	Marvin Bagley III	Duke	Trevon Bluiett	Xavier	No third team	
USBWA	Jalen Brunson	Villanova	Miles Bridges	Michigan State	No third team	
USBWA	Devonte' Graham	Kansas	Keenan Evans	Texas Tech	No third team	
USBWA	Trae Young	Oklahoma	Jock Landale	Saint Mary's	No third team	
NABC	Deandre Ayton	Arizona	Keita Bates-Diop	Ohio State	Joel Berry II	North Carolina
NABC	Marvin Bagley III	Duke	Trevon Bluiett	Xavier	Mikal Bridges	Villanova
NABC	Jalen Brunson	Villanova	Miles Bridges	Michigan State	Jevon Carter	West Virginia
NABC	Devonte' Graham	Kansas	Carsen Edwards	Purdue	Keenan Evans	Texas Tech
NABC	Trae Young	Oklahoma	Jock Landale	Saint Mary's	Kyle Guy	Virginia
Sporting News
Sporting News	Deandre Ayton	Arizona	Keita Bates-Diop	Ohio State	Mikal Bridges	Villanova
Sporting News	Marvin Bagley III	Duke	Trevon Bluiett	Xavier	Carsen Edwards	Purdue
Sporting News	Jalen Brunson	Villanova	Miles Bridges	Michigan State	Keenan Evans	Texas Tech
Sporting News	Devonte' Graham	Kansas	Jevon Carter	West Virginia	Aaron Holiday	UCLA
Sporting News	Trae Young	Oklahoma	Jock Landale	Saint Mary's	Luke Maye	North Carolina

AP Honorable Mention:

- Jaylen Adams, St. Bonaventure
- Peyton Aldridge, Davidson
- Grayson Allen, Duke
- Mo Bamba, Texas
- Trae Bell-Haynes, Vermont
- Joel Berry II, North Carolina
- Bogdan Bliznyuk, Eastern Washington
- Desonta Bradford, East Tennessee St.
- Tony Carr, Penn State
- Gary Clark, Cincinnati
- Xavier Cooks, Winthrop
- Jermaine Crumpton, Canisius
- Clayton Custer, Loyola (Illinois)
- Mike Daum, South Dakota State
- Ángel Delgado, Seton Hall
- Kahlil Dukes, Niagara
- Tre'Shaun Fletcher, Toledo
- Marcus Foster, Creighton
- Brandon Goodwin, Florida Gulf Coast
- Isaac Haas, Purdue
- Aaron Holiday, UCLA
- Jordan Howard, Central Arkansas
- Jemerrio Jones, New Mexico State
- Nick King, Middle Tennessee
- Kevin Knox II, Kentucky
- Fletcher Magee, Wofford
- Caleb Martin, Nevada
- Kelan Martin, Butler
- Yante Maten, Georgia
- Martaveous McKnight, Arkansas–Pine Bluff
- Kendrick Nunn, Oakland
- Shamorie Ponds, St. John's
- Jerome Robinson, Boston College
- Junior Robinson, Mount St. Mary's
- Collin Sexton, Alabama
- Landry Shamet, Wichita State
- T. J. Shorts, UC Davis
- D'Marcus Simonds, Georgia State
- Jonathan Stark, Murray State
- Brandon Tabb, Bethune–Cookman
- Zach Thomas, Bucknell
- Seth Towns, Harvard
- Allonzo Trier, Arizona
- Grant Williams, Tennessee
- Johnathan Williams, Gonzaga
- Justin Wright-Foreman, Hofstra

== Academic All-Americans ==
On March 12, 2018, the College Sports Information Directors of America (CoSIDA) announced the 2018 Academic All-America team, with Jevon Carter headlining the NCAA Division I team as the men's college basketball Academic All-American of the Year. The following is the 2017–18 Academic All-America Division I Men's Basketball Team as selected by CoSIDA:

First Team
Player	School	Class	GPA and major
Jevon Carter	West Virginia	Sr.	3.51, Sport Management
Tyler Clement	Creighton	GS	4.00/4.00, Finance / Marketing
A. J. Jacobson (Note: First-team selection in 2016–17 and third-team selection in 2015–16)	North Dakota State	GS	3.99 (U), Zoology; 4.00 (G), Master of Business Administration
Tyler Seibring (Note: Third-team selection in 2015–16)	Elon	Jr.	3.95, English/Economics
Joe Sherburne	UMBC	Jr.	4.00, Financial Economics

Second Team
Player	School	Class	GPA and major
Christian Adams	Coastal Carolina	Jr.	4.00, Economics & Finance
Jalen Brunson	Villanova	Jr.	3.34, Communications
Jordan Howard (Note: Second-team selection in 2016–17)	Central Arkansas	Sr.	3.71, Digital Filmmaking
Luke Maye	North Carolina	Jr.	3.45, Business Administration
Skylar Mays	LSU	So.	4.01, Biological Sciences
Dylan Windler	Belmont	Jr.	3.84, Accounting

Third Team
Player	School	Class	GPA and major
Marcus Bartley	Southern Illinois	Jr.	4.00, Sport Administration
Joshua Braun (Note: First-team selection in 2015-16 and 2016-17)	Grand Canyon	GS	3.83/3.60, Master of Business Administration
Stone Gettings	Cornell	Jr.	3.81, Applied Economics & Management
Reed Timmer	Drake	Sr.	3.47, Pharmacy
Kevin Vannatta	UNC Asheville	Sr.	3.93, Accounting

== Senior All-Americans ==
The ten finalists for the Senior CLASS Award are called Senior All-Americans. The first and second teams, as well as the award winner, were announced during the lead-in to the Final Four. The overall award winner is indicated in bold type.

=== First team ===
Player	Position	School
**Jevon Carter**	Guard	West Virginia
Shawn Anderson	Guard	Navy
A. J. Jacobson	Swingman	North Dakota State
Justin Johnson	Forward	Western Kentucky
Yante Maten	Forward	Georgia

=== Second team ===
Player	Position	School
Vladimir Brodziansky	Forward	TCU
Ángel Delgado	Center	Seton Hall
Rob Gray	Guard	Houston
Luke Morrison	Forward	Army
Johnathan Williams	Forward	Gonzaga
