= 2020–21 North Carolina Tar Heels men's basketball team =

American college basketball season

2020–21 North Carolina Tar Heels men's basketball

NCAA tournament, first round
- Conference: Atlantic Coast Conference
- Record: 18–11 (10–6 ACC)
- Head coach: Roy Williams (18th season)
- Assistant coaches: Steve Robinson (18th season); Hubert Davis (9th season); Brad Frederick (4th season)
- Home arena: Dean E. Smith Center

2020–21 ACC men's basketball standings
	Conf.				Overall
Team	W		L	PCT	W		L	PCT
No. 15 Virginia	13	–	4	.765	18	–	7	.720
No. 14 Florida State	11	–	4	.733	18	–	7	.720
No. 25 Virginia Tech	9	–	4	.692	15	–	7	.682
Georgia Tech †	11	–	6	.647	17	–	9	.654
Clemson	10	–	6	.625	16	–	8	.667
North Carolina	10	–	6	.625	18	–	11	.621
Louisville	8	–	5	.615	13	–	7	.650
Syracuse	9	–	7	.563	18	–	10	.643
NC State	9	–	8	.529	14	–	11	.560
Duke	9	–	9	.500	13	–	11	.542
Notre Dame	7	–	11	.389	11	–	15	.423
Pittsburgh	6	–	10	.375	10	–	12	.455
Miami (FL)	4	–	15	.211	10	–	17	.370
Wake Forest	3	–	15	.167	6	–	16	.273
Boston College	2	–	11	.154	4	–	16	.200
† 2021 ACC tournament winner Rankings from AP poll

The 2020–21 North Carolina Tar Heels men's basketball team represented the University of North Carolina at Chapel Hill during the 2020–21 NCAA Division I men's basketball season. The team was coached by Roy Williams, who was in his 18th and final season as UNC's head men's basketball coach. The Tar Heels played their home games at the Dean Smith Center in Chapel Hill, North Carolina as members of the Atlantic Coast Conference. They finished the 18–11, 10–6 in ACC play to finish in a tie for fifth place. As the No. 6 seed in the ACC Tournament, they defeated Notre Dame and Virginia Tech, before losing to Florida State in the semifinals. North Carolina received an at-large bid to the NCAA tournament as the No. 8 seed in the Midwest region. They lost in the first round to 9th-seeded Wisconsin.

On February 27, 2021, Roy Williams won his 900th career game in a win over Florida State, becoming the 5th and fastest Division I men's head coach to reach the milestone. On March 6, 2021, UNC completed a season sweep over rival Duke in a 91–73 win. Following the win, Roy Williams kissed the Smith Center court, causing speculation of possible retirement. Williams later said it was because of the team's 10–1 home record.

Following the season, Williams announced he was retiring after 18 years as head coach of North Carolina and 33 years of coaching. Several days later, the school named assistant coach Hubert Davis as the team's new head coach.

== Previous season ==
The Tar Heels finished the 2019–20 season 14–19, 6–14 in ACC play to finish in three-way tie for last place. As the No. 14 seed in the ACC tournament, they defeated Virginia Tech before losing to Syracuse in the second round. All postseason tournaments, including the remainder of the ACC Tournament, the NCAA tournament, and NIT were canceled due to the pandemic.

== Offseason ==
=== Departures ===
Name	Number	Pos.	Height	Weight	Year	Hometown	Reason for departure
Cole Anthony	2	G	6'3"	190	Freshman	New York, New York	Declared for the 2020 NBA draft; selected 15th overall by the Orlando Magic
Brandon Robinson	4	G	6'5"	173	Senior	Douglasville, Georgia	Graduated
Shea Rush	11	F	6'5"	210	Senior	Fairway, Kansas	Graduated
Jeremiah Francis	13	G	6'0"	210	Freshman	Reynoldsburg, Ohio	Transferred to New Mexico
Caleb Ellis	25	F	6'5"	190	Graduate student	Apex, North Carolina	Completed athletic eligibility
Justin Pierce	32	F	6'7"	210	Graduate student	Glen Ellyn, Illinois	Completed athletic eligibility
Robbie O'Han	34	G	6'2"	170	Senior	Raleigh, North Carolina	Graduated
Brandon Huffman	42	F	6'10"	255	Junior	Goldsboro, North Carolina	Transferred to Jacksonville State
Christian Keeling	55	G	6'3"	180	Graduate student	Augusta, Georgia	Completed athletic eligibility

=== 2020 recruiting class ===
College recruiting
Name	Hometown	School	Height	Weight	Commit date
Day'Ron Sharpe; C	Greenville, NC	Montverde Academy (FL)	6 ft 10 in (2.08 m)	246 lb (112 kg)	Jun 19, 2018
Day'Ron Sharpe; C	Recruit ratings: Rivals: 247Sports: ESPN: (94)				
Walker Kessler; C	Newnan, GA	Woodward Academy (GA)	7 ft 0 in (2.13 m)	245 lb (111 kg)	Sep 22, 2019
Walker Kessler; C	Recruit ratings: Rivals: 247Sports: ESPN: (94)				
Caleb Love; PG	St. Louis, MO	Christian Brothers College (MO)	6 ft 3 in (1.91 m)	180 lb (82 kg)	Oct 1, 2019
Caleb Love; PG	Recruit ratings: Rivals: 247Sports: ESPN: (94)				
R. J. Davis; PG	White Plains, NY	Archbishop Stepinac (NY)	6 ft 1 in (1.85 m)	160 lb (73 kg)	Oct 21, 2019
R. J. Davis; PG	Recruit ratings: Rivals: 247Sports: ESPN: (87)				
Puff Johnson; SF	Moon Township, PA	Hillcrest Prep (AZ)	6 ft 7 in (2.01 m)	185 lb (84 kg)	Nov 5, 2019
Puff Johnson; SF	Recruit ratings: Rivals: 247Sports: ESPN: (85)				
Kerwin Walton; SG	Hopkins, MN	Hopkins (MN)	6 ft 5 in (1.96 m)	195 lb (88 kg)	Apr 27, 2020
Kerwin Walton; SG	Recruit ratings: Rivals: 247Sports: ESPN: (81)				
Overall recruit ranking: Rivals: 3 247Sports: 2 ESPN: 3
Note: In many cases, Scout, Rivals, 247Sports, On3, and ESPN may conflict in their listings of height and weight.; In these cases, the average was taken. ESPN grades are on a 100-point scale.; Sources: "North Carolina 2020 Basketball Commitments". Rivals.; "2020 North Carolina Tar Heels Recruiting Class". ESPN.; "2020 Team Ranking". Rivals.

=== 2021 recruiting class ===
College recruiting (2021)
Name	Hometown	School	Height	Weight	Commit date
Dontrez Styles; SF	Kinston, NC	Kinston	6 ft 7 in (2.01 m)	205 lb (93 kg)	Apr 18, 2020
Dontrez Styles; SF	Recruit ratings: Rivals: 247Sports: ESPN: (85)				
D'Marco Dunn; SG	Tucson, AZ	Westover (NC)	6 ft 4 in (1.93 m)	180 lb (82 kg)	Sep 30, 2020
D'Marco Dunn; SG	Recruit ratings: Rivals: 247Sports: ESPN: (83)				
Overall recruit ranking: Rivals: 37 247Sports: 37
Note: In many cases, Scout, Rivals, 247Sports, On3, and ESPN may conflict in their listings of height and weight.; In these cases, the average was taken. ESPN grades are on a 100-point scale.; Sources: "North Carolina 2021 Basketball Commitments". Rivals.; "2021 North Carolina Tar Heels Recruiting Class". ESPN.; "2021 Team Ranking". Rivals.

== Roster ==
2020–21 North Carolina Tar Heels men's basketball team
Players
Coaches

Pos.	#	Name	Height	Weight	Year	Previous school	Hometown
G	0	Anthony Harris	6 ft 4 in (1.93 m)	196 lb (89 kg)	RS Fr	Paul VI Catholic	Woodbridge, VA
G/F	1	Leaky Black	6 ft 8 in (2.03 m)	195 lb (88 kg)	Jr	Cox Mill	Concord, NC
G	2	Caleb Love	6 ft 4 in (1.93 m)	195 lb (88 kg)	Fr	Christian Brothers College	St. Louis, MO
G	3	Andrew Platek	6 ft 4 in (1.93 m)	205 lb (93 kg)	Sr	Northfield Mount Hermon	Guilderland, NY
G	4	R. J. Davis	6 ft 0 in (1.83 m)	160 lb (73 kg)	Fr	Archbishop Stepinac	White Plains, NY
F/C	5	Armando Bacot	6 ft 10 in (2.08 m)	240 lb (109 kg)	So	IMG Academy	Richmond, VA
F/C	11	Day'Ron Sharpe	6 ft 11 in (2.11 m)	265 lb (120 kg)	Fr	Montverde Academy	Greenville, NC
F/C	13	Walker Kessler	7 ft 1 in (2.16 m)	245 lb (111 kg)	Fr	Woodward Academy	Newnan, GA
G	14	Puff Johnson	6 ft 8 in (2.03 m)	190 lb (86 kg)	Fr	Hillcrest Prep	Moon Township, PA
F	15	Garrison Brooks	6 ft 10 in (2.08 m)	240 lb (109 kg)	Sr	Auburn	Lafayette, AL
F/C	21	Sterling Manley	6 ft 11 in (2.11 m)	250 lb (113 kg)	RS Jr	Pickerington Central	Pickerington, OH
F/C	22	Walker Miller (W)	6 ft 11 in (2.11 m)	235 lb (107 kg)	Sr	New Hampton	Greensboro, NC
G	24	Kerwin Walton	6 ft 5 in (1.96 m)	205 lb (93 kg)	Fr	Hopkins	Hopkins, MN
G	25	Creighton Lebo (W)	6 ft 1 in (1.85 m)	160 lb (73 kg)	Fr	Greenfield	Wilson, NC
G	30	K. J. Smith (W)	6 ft 2 in (1.88 m)	170 lb (77 kg)	RS Sr	IMG Academy	Calabasas, CA
F	34	Duwe Farris (W)	6 ft 6 in (1.98 m)	205 lb (93 kg)	So	Myers Park	Charlotte, NC
F	35	Ryan McAdoo	6 ft 5 in (1.96 m)	200 lb (91 kg)	RS Jr	Saint Andrew's	Boca Raton, FL

Head coach

- Roy Williams (North Carolina)

Assistant coach(es)

- Steve Robinson (Radford)
- Hubert Davis (North Carolina)
- Brad Frederick (North Carolina)

Legend

- (C) Team captain
- (S) Suspended
- (I) Ineligible
- (W) Walk-on
- Injured
- Current redshirt

Roster
Last update: December 28, 2020

== Schedule and results ==
Date time, TV	Rank^{#}	Opponent^{#}	Result	Record	High points	High rebounds	High assists	Site (attendance) city, state
Non-conference regular season
November 25, 2020*; 6:00 p.m., ACCN	No. 16	College of Charleston	W 79–60	1–0	17 – Love	11 – Brooks	4 – Love	Dean Smith Center (0); Chapel Hill, NC
November 30, 2020*; 7:00 p.m., ESPN2	No. 14	vs. UNLV; Maui Invitational Quarterfinals	W 78–51	2–0	16 – Davis	10 – Black	4 – Love	Harrah's Cherokee Center (0); Asheville, NC
December 1, 2020*; 4:00 p.m., ESPN	No. 14	vs. Stanford; Maui Invitational semifinals	W 67–63	3–0	16 – Love	9 – Brooks	4 – Sharpe	Harrah's Cherokee Center (0); Asheville, NC
December 2, 2020*; 4:00 p.m., ESPN	No. 14	vs. No. 17 Texas; Maui Invitational finals	L 67–69	3–1	18 – Brooks	11 – Tied	3 – Davis	Harrah's Cherokee Center (0); Asheville, NC
December 8, 2020*; 7:30 p.m., ESPN	No. 16	at No. 3 Iowa; ACC–Big Ten Challenge	L 80–93	3–2	17 – Brooks	11 – Bacot	8 – Davis	Carver–Hawkeye Arena (583); Iowa City, IA
December 12, 2020; 3:00 p.m., ACCRSN		Elon	Postponed due to COVID-19 issues					Dean Smith Center; Chapel Hill, NC
December 12, 2020*; 2:00 p.m., ACCRSN	No. 16	NC Central	W 73–67	4–2	19 – Bacot	11 – Bacot	4 – Love	Dean Smith Center (0); Chapel Hill, NC
December 19, 2020*; 2:00 p.m., CBS	No. 22	vs. Kentucky; CBS Sports Classic	W 75–63	5–2	14 – Bacot	11 – Sharpe	6 – Love	Rocket Mortgage FieldHouse (0); Cleveland, OH
ACC regular season
December 22, 2020; 9:00 p.m., ACCN	No. 17	at NC State; Rivalry	L 76–79	5–3 (0–1)	16 – Bacot	7 – Tied	4 – Tied	PNC Arena (0); Raleigh, NC
December 30, 2020; 8:00 p.m., ACCRSN		at Georgia Tech	L 67–72	5–4 (0–2)	14 – Bacot	11 – Brooks	4 – Tied	McCamish Pavilion (1,200); Atlanta, GA
January 2, 2021; 4:00 p.m., ACCN		Notre Dame	W 66–65	6–4 (1–2)	25 – Sharpe	10 – Bacot	4 – Brooks	Dean Smith Center (0); Chapel Hill, NC
January 5, 2021; 8:00 p.m., ESPN		at Miami (FL)	W 67–65	7–4 (2–2)	16 – Black	16 – Sharpe	4 – Tied	Watsco Center (0); Coral Gables, FL
January 9, 2021; 7:00 p.m., ESPN		No. 19 Clemson	Postponed due to COVID-19 issues					Dean Smith Center; Chapel Hill, NC
January 12, 2021; 9:00 p.m., ACCN		Syracuse	W 81–75	8–4 (3–2)	16 – Brooks	10 – Bacot	7 – Black	Dean Smith Center (0); Chapel Hill, NC
January 16, 2021; 12:00 p.m., ESPN		at Florida State	L 75–82	8–5 (3–3)	16 – Davis	6 – Sharpe	3 – 4 tied	Donald L. Tucker Center (2,850); Tallahassee, FL
January 20, 2021; 9:00 p.m., ACCN		Wake Forest; Rivalry	W 80–73	9–5 (4–3)	20 – Love	7 – Brooks	8 – Black	Dean Smith Center (0); Chapel Hill, NC
January 23, 2021; 2:00 p.m., ESPN		NC State; Rivalry	W 86–76	10–5 (5–3)	17 – Bacot	10 – Sharpe	5 – Love	Dean Smith Center (0); Chapel Hill, NC
January 26, 2021; 7:00 p.m., ACCN		at Pittsburgh	W 75–65	11–5 (6–3)	21 – Bacot	10 – Bacot	5 – Love	Petersen Events Center (500); Pittsburgh, PA
February 2, 2021; 7:00 p.m., ACCN		at Clemson	L 50–63	11–6 (6–4)	16 – Sharpe	9 – Brooks	2 – Davis	Littlejohn Coliseum (1,876); Clemson, SC
February 6, 2021; 6:00 p.m., ESPN		at Duke; Rivalry	W 91–87	12–6 (7–4)	25 – Love	9 – Sharpe	7 – Love	Cameron Indoor Stadium (0); Durham, NC
February 8, 2021; 7:00 p.m., ESPN		Miami (FL)	Postponed due to COVID-19 issues					Dean Smith Center; Chapel Hill, NC
February 13, 2021; 6:00 p.m., ESPN		at No. 9 Virginia	L 48–60	12–7 (7–5)	9 – Kessler	10 – Bacot	3 – Tied	John Paul Jones Arena (250); Charlottesville, VA
February 16, 2021; 7:00 p.m., ACCN		No. 18 Virginia Tech	Postponed due to COVID-19 issues					Dean Smith Center; Chapel Hill, NC
February 17, 2021*; 7:00 p.m., ACCNX		Northeastern	W 82–62	13–7	15 – Sharpe	13 – Brooks	9 – Love	Dean Smith Center (0); Chapel Hill, NC
February 20, 2021; 6:00 p.m., ESPN		Louisville	W 99–54	14–7 (8–5)	21 – Sharpe	11 – Sharpe	5 – Platek	Dean Smith Center (0); Chapel Hill, NC
February 23, 2021; 9:00 p.m., ACCN		at Boston College	Postponed due to COVID-19 issues					Conte Forum; Chestnut Hill, MA
February 24, 2021*; 7:00 p.m., ESPN2		Marquette	L 70–83	14–8	18 – Brooks	11 – Sharpe	7 – Love	Dean Smith Center (0); Chapel Hill, NC
February 27, 2021; 4:00 p.m., ESPN		No. 11 Florida State	W 78–70	15–8 (9–5)	20 – Kessler	8 – Kessler	4 – Black	Dean Smith Center (0); Chapel Hill, NC
March 1, 2021; 7:00 p.m., ESPN		at Syracuse	L 70–72	15–9 (9–6)	18 – Bacot	15 – Bacot	3 – Tied	Carrier Dome (0); Syracuse, NY
March 6, 2021; 6:00 p.m., ESPN		Duke; Rivalry	W 91–73	16–9 (10–6)	18 – Tied	6 – Bacot	7 – Love	Dean Smith Center (3,263); Chapel Hill, NC
ACC tournament
March 10, 2021; 9:00 p.m., ACCN	(6)	vs. (11) Notre Dame; Second round	W 101–59	17–9	20 – Bacot	13 – Bacot	6 – Tied	Greensboro Coliseum (2,820); Greensboro, NC
March 11, 2021; 9:00 p.m., ESPN	(6)	vs. (3) No. 22 Virginia Tech; Quarterfinals	W 81–73	18–9	19 – Davis	13 – Bacot	3 – Tied	Greensboro Coliseum (2,820); Greensboro, NC
March 12, 2021; 8:30 p.m., ESPN	(6)	vs. (2) No. 15 Florida State; Semifinals	L 66–69	18–10	13 – Love	8 – Brooks	2 – Tied	Greensboro Coliseum (2,820); Greensboro, NC
NCAA tournament
March 19, 2021*; 7:10 p.m., CBS	(8 S)	vs. (9 S) Wisconsin; First Round	L 62–85	18–11	15 – Bacot	10 – Brooks	3 – Love	Mackey Arena; West Lafayette, IN
*Non-conference game. ^{#}Rankings from AP Poll. (#) Tournament seedings in parentheses. S=South. All times are in Eastern Time.

== Rankings ==
On January 18, 2021, Duke fell out of the AP Top 25 ranking for the first time since February 8, 2016. This broke a 59-year streak and marked the first time since December 25, 1961 that the powerhouse trio of Duke, Kentucky and North Carolina were all out of the Top 25 ranking.

Ranking movements Legend: ██ Increase in ranking ██ Decrease in ranking — = Not ranked RV = Received votes
	Week																	
Poll	Pre	1	2	3	4	5	6	7	8	9	10	11	12	13	14	15	16	Final
AP	16	14	16	22	17	RV	—	—	—	—	RV	RV	RV	RV	RV	—	—	Not released
Coaches	16	16^	14	21	17	RV	—	—	—	—	RV	—	—	RV	RV	RV	—	—

^Coaches did not release a Week 1 poll.
