= Ian DuBose =

American basketball player

No. 11 – Bakken Bears
- Position: Shooting guard
- League: Basketligaen

Personal information
- Born: January 16, 1999 (age 27) Durham, North Carolina, U.S.
- Listed height: 6 ft 4 in (1.93 m)
- Listed weight: 225 lb (102 kg)

Career information
- High school: Ravenscroft School (Raleigh, North Carolina)
- College: Houston Baptist (2017–2020); Wake Forest (2020–2021)
- NBA draft: 2021: undrafted
- Playing career: 2021–present

Career history
- 2021: Kirchheim Knights
- 2021–2023: BC Kolín
- 2023–2024: Caledonia Gladiators
- 2024–2025: Manchester Basketball
- 2025–present: Bakken Bears

Career highlights
- 2x Second-team All-Southland (2019, 2020)

Ian Rogers DuBose (born January 16, 1999) is an American professional basketball player for Bakken Bears of the Basketligaen. He played college basketball for the Houston Baptist Huskies and the Wake Forest Demon Deacons.

== Early life ==
DuBose attended the Ravenscroft School, where he was a member of the National Honor Society. He averaged 15 points and 2.6 assists per game as a junior. As a senior, he averaged 20.4 points, 7.8 rebounds, and 5.4 assists per game. DuBose was lightly recruited by major programs, generally considered a backup option in case their top prospect signed elsewhere. However, he was considered the top option by Houston Baptist and he committed to the Huskies in October 2019.

== College career ==
DuBose started every game as a freshman, averaging 12.5 points and 5.5 rebounds per game. DuBose averaged 17 points, 5.9 rebounds, 3.4 assists and 1.6 steals per game as a sophomore, shooting 43.8 percent from three-point range. He was named to the Second Team All-Southland. On January 2, 2020 he scored a career-high 44 points and had 11 rebounds in a 111–107 overtime win against Central Arkansas. As a junior, DuBose averaged 19 points, 7.3 rebounds and 3.8 assists per game. He was named to the Second Team All-Southland for the second consecutive season and earned Southland men's basketball student-athlete of the year honors with a 3.84 grade point average. DuBose opted to transfer to Wake Forest as a graduate transfer, choosing the Demon Deacons over offers from NC State, Arkansas, Northwestern, DePaul and Georgetown. He remained with the program despite the firing of coach Danny Manning after having a conversation with new coach Steve Forbes. During his senior season, DuBose missed more than two months of gameplay due to a COVID-19 shutdown and an undisclosed medical issue. In 11 games as a senior, he averaged 10.9 points and 4.6 rebounds per game. Following the season, DuBose opted to turn professional rather than take advantage of the additional season of eligibility, granted by the NCAA due to the COVID-19 pandemic.

== Professional career ==
On August 20, 2021, DuBose signed his first professional contract with the Kirchheim Knights of the German ProA league. DuBose was selected with the 12th pick of the second round in the 2021 NBA G League draft by the Fort Wayne Mad Ants. However, he was waived on October 29. On November 23, DuBose signed with BC Kolín of the Czech National Basketball League (NBL). In 2023, he joined Caledonia Gladiators. On December 12, 2024, DuBose signed with Manchester Basketball of the Super League Basketball,

On October 10, 2025, he signed with Bakken Bears of the Basketligaen.

== Career statistics ==
Legend
GP	Games played	GS	Games started	MPG	Minutes per game
FG%	Field goal percentage	3P%	3-point field goal percentage	FT%	Free throw percentage
RPG	Rebounds per game	APG	Assists per game	SPG	Steals per game
BPG	Blocks per game	PPG	Points per game	**Bold**	Career high

=== College ===
Year	Team	GP	GS	MPG	FG%	3P%	FT%	RPG	APG	SPG	BPG	PPG
2017–18	Houston Baptist	**31**	**30**	28.6	.406	.350	.620	5.5	2.0	1.4	**.4**	12.5
2018–19	Houston Baptist	30	**30**	30.4	**.486**	**.438**	.707	5.9	3.4	**1.6**	.3	17.0
2019–20	Houston Baptist	29	28	**33.1**	.439	.326	**.775**	**7.3**	**3.8**	1.4	.3	**19.0**
2020–21	Wake Forest	11	10	24.6	.456	.361	.595	4.6	2.4	1.4	.2	10.9
Career		101	98	30.0	.445	.370	.699	6.0	3.0	1.5	.3	15.5

== Personal life ==
In addition to basketball, DuBose plays the double bass.
