= 2021 ACC men's basketball tournament =

American college basketball competition

- 2021 ACC Tournament logo
- Classification: Division I
- Season: 2020–21
- Teams: 15
- Site: Greensboro Coliseum; Greensboro, North Carolina
- Champions: Georgia Tech (4th title)
- Winning coach: Josh Pastner (1st title)
- MVP: Michael Devoe (Georgia Tech)
- Television: ESPN, ESPN2, ACCN

2020–21 ACC men's basketball standings
	Conf.				Overall
Team	W		L	PCT	W		L	PCT
No. 15 Virginia	13	–	4	.765	18	–	7	.720
No. 14 Florida State	11	–	4	.733	18	–	7	.720
No. 25 Virginia Tech	9	–	4	.692	15	–	7	.682
Georgia Tech †	11	–	6	.647	17	–	9	.654
Clemson	10	–	6	.625	16	–	8	.667
North Carolina	10	–	6	.625	18	–	11	.621
Louisville	8	–	5	.615	13	–	7	.650
Syracuse	9	–	7	.563	18	–	10	.643
NC State	9	–	8	.529	14	–	11	.560
Duke	9	–	9	.500	13	–	11	.542
Notre Dame	7	–	11	.389	11	–	15	.423
Pittsburgh	6	–	10	.375	10	–	12	.455
Miami (FL)	4	–	15	.211	10	–	17	.370
Wake Forest	3	–	15	.167	6	–	16	.273
Boston College	2	–	11	.154	4	–	16	.200
† 2021 ACC tournament winner Rankings from AP poll

The 2021 ACC men's basketball tournament (officially the 2021 ACC Men's Basketball Tournament Presented by New York Life) was the postseason men's basketball tournament for the Atlantic Coast Conference and held at the Greensboro Coliseum in Greensboro, North Carolina, from March 9 to 13, 2021. It was the 68th annual edition of the tournament.

The 2021 Atlantic Coast Conference basketball tournament was originally scheduled to be hosted at the Capital One Arena in Washington, D.C. However, due to the ongoing COVID-19 pandemic, the tournament was moved to the Greensboro Coliseum in Greensboro, North Carolina, on November 24, 2020. Capital One Arena eventually hosted the tournament in 2024.

Virginia and Duke elected to withdraw from the tournament due to some of their players testing positive for COVID-19.

The tournament final was the second-ever ACC championship game, and the first since Georgia Tech beat Virginia in 1990, to feature no teams from the state of North Carolina.

== Seeds ==
All 15 ACC teams were scheduled to participate in the tournament. Teams were seeded by record within the conference, with a tiebreaker system to seed teams with identical conference records. The top four seeds received double byes, while seeds 5 through 9 received single byes.

Seed	School	Conference Record	Tiebreaker
1	Virginia	13–4	
2	Florida State	11–4	
3	Virginia Tech	9–4	
4	Georgia Tech	11–6	
5	Clemson	10–6	1–0 vs. North Carolina
6	North Carolina	10–6	0–1 vs. Clemson
7	Louisville	8–5	
8	Syracuse	9–7	
9	NC State	9–8	
10	Duke	9–9	
11	Notre Dame	7–11	
12	Pittsburgh	6–10	
13	Miami	4–15	
14	Wake Forest	3–15	
15	Boston College	2–11	

== Schedule ==
Session	Game	Time	Matchup	Score	Television	Attendance
First round – Tuesday, March 9
Opening day	1	2:00 pm	No. 12 Pittsburgh vs. No. 13 Miami	73–79	ACCN	2,820
Opening day	2	4:30 pm	No. 10 Duke vs. No. 15 Boston College	86–51	ACCN	2,820
Opening day	3	7:00 pm	No. 11 Notre Dame vs. No. 14 Wake Forest	80–77	ACCN	2,820
Second round – Wednesday, March 10
1	4	12:00 pm	No. 8 Syracuse vs. No. 9 NC State	89–68	ACCN	2,820
1	5	2:30 pm	No. 5 Clemson vs. No. 13 Miami	64–67	ACCN	2,820
2	6	6:30 pm	No. 7 Louisville vs. No. 10 Duke	56–70	ACCN	2,820
2	7	9:00 pm	No. 6 North Carolina vs. No. 11 Notre Dame	101–59	ACCN	2,820
Quarterfinals – Thursday, March 11
3	8	12:00 pm	No. 1 Virginia vs. No. 8 Syracuse	72–69	ESPN2	2,820
3	9	2:30 pm	No. 4 Georgia Tech vs. No. 13 Miami	70–66	ESPN2	2,820
4	10	6:30 pm	No. 2 Florida State vs. No. 10 Duke	Cancelled (Note: Duke withdrew from the ACC tournament after a player tested positive for COVID-19, which led to the game being cancelled, and Florida State advancing in the tournament.)	ESPN	2,820
4	11	8:30 pm	No. 3 Virginia Tech vs. No. 6 North Carolina	73-81	ESPN	2,820
Semifinals – Friday, March 12
5	12	6:30 pm	No. 1 Virginia vs. No. 4 Georgia Tech	Cancelled (Note: Virginia withdrew from the ACC tournament after a player tested positive for COVID-19, which led to the game being cancelled, and Georgia Tech advancing in the tournament.)	ESPN2	2,820
5	13	8:30 pm	No. 2 Florida State vs. No. 6 North Carolina	69–66	ESPN	2,820
Championship – Saturday, March 13
6	14	8:30pm	No. 2 Florida State vs. No. 4 Georgia Tech	75–80	ESPN	2,820
Game times in ET. Rankings denote tournament seed.

== Bracket ==
First round Tuesday, March 9 ACCN
12	Pittsburgh	73
13	Miami	79
10	Duke	86
15	Boston College	51
11	Notre Dame	80
14	Wake Forest	77

Second round Wednesday, March 10; ACCN
8	Syracuse	89
9	NC State	68
5	Clemson	64
13	Miami	67
7	Louisville	56
10	Duke	70
6	North Carolina	101
11	Notre Dame	59

Quarterfinals; Thursday, March 11; ESPN/ESPN2
1	#16 Virginia	72
8	Syracuse	69
4	Georgia Tech	70
13	Miami	66
2	#15 Florida State
10	~~Duke~~
3	#22 Virginia Tech	73
6	North Carolina	81

Semifinals; Friday, March 12; ESPN
1	~~#16 Virginia~~
4	Georgia Tech
2	#15 Florida State	69
6	North Carolina	66

Championship; Saturday, March 13; ESPN
4	Georgia Tech	80
2	#15 Florida State	75

== Game summaries ==
=== First round ===
ACCN

March 9
2:00 p.m.

Report

No. 12 Pittsburgh 73, No. 13 Miami 79
Scoring by half: 36–40, 37–39
Pts: Odukale (28); Rebs: Champagnie (10); Asts: Horton/Odukale (3)	Pts: Wong (20); Rebs: Walker (9); Asts: McGusty/Walker (4)

Greensboro Coliseum
Greensboro, NC
Referees: Jamie Luckie
AJ Desai
Mark Schnur

ACCN

March 9
4:30 p.m.

Report

No. 10 Duke 86, No. 15 Boston College 51
Scoring by half: 41–27, 45–24
Pts: Steward (17); Rebs: Hurt (7); Asts: Roach (5)	Pts: Ashton-Langford (9); Rebs: Felder/Heath/Karnik (5); Asts: Ashton-Langford (4)

Greensboro Coliseum
Greensboro, NC
Referees: Brian Dorsey
Clarence Armstrong
Jeff Pon

ACCN

March 9
7:00 p.m.

Report

No. 11 Notre Dame 80, No. 14 Wake Forest 77
Scoring by half: 37–44, 43–33
Pts: Durham (16); Rebs: Durham (10); Asts: Hubb (4)	Pts: Williamson (21); Rebs: Mucius (12); Asts: Whitt (7)

Greensboro Coliseum
Greensboro, NC
Attendance: 2,820
Referees: Lee Cassell
Tony Henderson
Tommy Morrissey

=== Second round ===
ACCN

March 10
12:00 p.m.

Report

No. 8 Syracuse 89, No. 9 NC State 68
Scoring by half: 43–38, 46–30
Pts: Boeheim (27); Rebs: Griffin/Edwards (8); Asts: Boeheim/Griffin (5)	Pts: Funderburk (14); Rebs: Seabron (8); Asts: Beverly (4)

Greensboro Coliseum
Greensboro, NC
Referees: Ron Groover
Bill Covington Jr.
Mark Schnur

ACCN

March 10
2:30 p.m.

Report

No. 5 Clemson 64, No. 13 Miami 67
Scoring by half: 36–32, 28–35
Pts: Simms (17); Rebs: Simms (8); Asts: Simms (4)	Pts: Wong (20); Rebs: Wong (7); Asts: McGusty (4)

Greensboro Coliseum
Greensboro, NC
Attendance: 2,820
Referees: Bert Smith
Tony Henderson
Jerry Heater

ACCN

March 10
6:30 p.m.

Report

No. 7 Louisville 56, No. 10 Duke 70
Scoring by half: 29–30, 27–40
Pts: Johnson (14); Rebs: Johnson (11); Asts: Jones (3)	Pts: Williams (23); Rebs: Williams (19); Asts: Moore (5)

Greensboro Coliseum
Greensboro, NC
Referees: Roger Ayers
Jamie Luckie
Tommy Morissey

ACCN

March 10
9:00 p.m.

Report

No. 6 North Carolina 101, No. 11 Notre Dame 59
Scoring by half: 50–36, 51–23
Pts: Bacot (20); Rebs: Bacot (13); Asts: Love/Sharpe (6)	Pts: Hubb/Laszewski (13); Rebs: Durham (6); Asts: Hubb (3)

Greensboro Coliseum
Greensboro, NC
Attendance: 2,820
Referees: Ted Valentine
A.J. Desai
Justin Porterfield

=== Quarterfinals ===
ESPN2

March 11
12:00 p.m.

Report

No. 1 Virginia 72, No. 8 Syracuse 69
Scoring by half: 36–39, 36–30
Pts: Hauser (21); Rebs: Huff (12); Asts: Clark (6)	Pts: Boeheim (31); Rebs: Guerrier (10); Asts: Girard/Dolezaj (4)

Greensboro Coliseum
Greensboro, NC
Attendance: 2,820
Referees: Bert Smith
Jamie Luckie
Tony Henderson

ESPN2

March 11
2:30 p.m.

Report

No. 4 Georgia Tech 70, No. 13 Miami 66
Scoring by half: 29–33, 41–33
Pts: Usher (15); Rebs: Wright (6); Asts: Devoe (7)	Pts: McGusty (25); Rebs: McGusty (7); Asts: Wong (4)

Greensboro Coliseum
Greensboro, NC
Attendance: 2,820
Referees: Roger Ayers
Clarence Armstrong
Tommy Morrissey

ESPN

March 11
6:30 p.m.

No. 2 Florida State vs. No. 10 Duke
Florida State advanced due to positive COVID test at Duke which led to the team withdrawing from the tournament

Greensboro Coliseum
Greensboro, NC

ESPN

March 11
9:00 p.m.

Report

No. 3 Virginia Tech 73, No. 6 North Carolina 81
Scoring by half: 35–32, 38–49
Pts: Mutts (24); Rebs: Aluma/Mutts (8); Asts: Bede (7)	Pts: Davis (19); Rebs: Bacot (13); Asts: Black/Harris (3)

Greensboro Coliseum
Greensboro, NC
Attendance: 2,820
Referees: Ron Groover
Lee Cassell
Brian Dorsey

=== Semifinals ===
ESPN2

March 12
6:30 p.m.

No. 1 Virginia vs. No. 4 Georgia Tech
Georgia Tech advanced due to positive COVID test at Virginia which led to the team withdrawing from the tournament

Greensboro Coliseum
Greensboro, NC

ESPN

March 12
8:30 p.m.

Report

No. 2 Florida State 69, No. 6 North Carolina 66
Scoring by half: 35-24, 34-42
Pts: Koprivica (17); Rebs: Koprivica (11); Asts: Barnes (4)	Pts: Love (13); Rebs: Brooks (8); Asts: Harris/Davis (2)

Greensboro Coliseum
Greensboro, NC
Attendance: 2,820
Referees: Bert Smith, Roger Ayers, Clarence Armstrong

=== Final ===
ESPN

March 13
8:30 p.m.

Report

No. 4 Georgia Tech 80, No. 2 Florida State 75
Scoring by half: 31–30, 49–45
Pts: Devoe (20); Rebs: Wright (8); Asts: Alvarado/Devoe/Usher (3)	Pts: Barnes (21); Rebs: Koprivica (10); Asts: Polite (4)

Greensboro Coliseum
Greensboro, NC
Attendance: 2,820
Referees: Ron Groover
Bill Covington Jr.
Ted Valentine

== Awards and honors ==
Tournament MVP: Michael Devoe, Georgia Tech

All-Tournament Teams:

First Team
- Jose Alvarado, Georgia Tech
- Armando Bacot, North Carolina
- Buddy Boeheim, Syracuse
- Michael Devoe, Georgia Tech
- Balsa Koprivica, Florida State

Second Team
- Scottie Barnes, Florida State
- Kameron McGusty, Miami (FL)
- Jordan Usher, Georgia Tech
- Mark Williams, Duke
- Isaiah Wong, Miami (FL)

== See also ==
- 2021 ACC women's basketball tournament
