= 2020–21 Notre Dame Fighting Irish men's basketball team =

American college basketball season

2020–21 Notre Dame Fighting Irish men's basketball
- Conference: Atlantic Coast Conference
- Record: 11–15 (7–11 ACC)
- Head coach: Mike Brey (21st season)
- Assistant coaches: Rod Balanis; Ryan Humphrey; Scott Martin
- Home arena: Purcell Pavilion

2020–21 ACC men's basketball standings
	Conf.				Overall
Team	W		L	PCT	W		L	PCT
No. 15 Virginia	13	–	4	.765	18	–	7	.720
No. 14 Florida State	11	–	4	.733	18	–	7	.720
No. 25 Virginia Tech	9	–	4	.692	15	–	7	.682
Georgia Tech †	11	–	6	.647	17	–	9	.654
Clemson	10	–	6	.625	16	–	8	.667
North Carolina	10	–	6	.625	18	–	11	.621
Louisville	8	–	5	.615	13	–	7	.650
Syracuse	9	–	7	.563	18	–	10	.643
NC State	9	–	8	.529	14	–	11	.560
Duke	9	–	9	.500	13	–	11	.542
Notre Dame	7	–	11	.389	11	–	15	.423
Pittsburgh	6	–	10	.375	10	–	12	.455
Miami (FL)	4	–	15	.211	10	–	17	.370
Wake Forest	3	–	15	.167	6	–	16	.273
Boston College	2	–	11	.154	4	–	16	.200
† 2021 ACC tournament winner Rankings from AP poll

The 2020–21 Notre Dame Fighting Irish men's basketball team represented the University of Notre Dame during the 2020–21 NCAA Division I men's basketball season. The Fighting Irish were led by 21st-year head coach Mike Brey and played their home games at the Purcell Pavilion in Notre Dame, Indiana as eight-year members of the Atlantic Coast Conference.

The Fighting Irish finished the season 11–15, 7–11 in ACC play, to finish in eleventh place. In the ACC tournament they defeated Wake Forest before losing to North Carolina in the second round. They were not invited to either the NCAA tournament or NIT.

== Previous season ==
The Fighting Irish finished the 2019–20 season 20–12, 10–10 in ACC play to finish in a tie for eight place. As the No. 7 seed in the ACC tournament, they defeated Boston College in the second round. The team was scheduled to play Virginia in the quarterfinals of the ACC tournament before the tournament was cancelled due to the COVID-19 pandemic. The NCAA tournament and NIT were also cancelled due to the pandemic.

== Offseason ==
=== Departures ===
Name	Number	Pos.	Height	Weight	Year	Hometown	Reason for departure
Rex Pflueger	0	G	6'6"	218	Graduate Student	Dana Point, CA	Graduated
T. J. Gibbs	10	G	6'3"	185	Senior	Scotch Plains, NJ	Graduated
Chris Doherty	15	F	6'8"	235	Sophomore	Marlborough, MA	Transferred to Northeastern
John Mooney	33	F	6'9"	245	Senior	Orlando, FL	Graduated

=== Incoming transfers ===
Name	Number	Pos.	Height	Weight	Year	Hometown	Previous School
Trey Wertz	2	G	6'5"	195	Junior	Charlotte, NC	Santa Clara

=== 2020 recruiting class ===
College recruiting
Name	Hometown	School	Height	Weight	Commit date
Elijah Taylor #44 PF	Philadelphia, PA	Imhotep Charter	6 ft 8 in (2.03 m)	231 lb (105 kg)	Sep 19, 2019
Elijah Taylor #44 PF	Recruit ratings: Rivals: 247Sports: ESPN: (79)				
Matt Zona #29 C	Blauvelt, NY	Bergen Catholic	6 ft 9 in (2.06 m)	243 lb (110 kg)	Sep 30, 2019
Matt Zona #29 C	Recruit ratings: Rivals: 247Sports: ESPN: (77)				
Tony Sanders Jr. SF	Miami, FL	Gulliver Prep	6 ft 7 in (2.01 m)	202 lb (92 kg)	Apr 3, 2020
Tony Sanders Jr. SF	Recruit ratings: Rivals: 247Sports: ESPN: (0)				
Overall recruit ranking: Rivals: 75 247Sports: 74
Note: In many cases, Scout, Rivals, 247Sports, On3, and ESPN may conflict in their listings of height and weight.; In these cases, the average was taken. ESPN grades are on a 100-point scale.; Sources: "Notre Dame Fighting Irish". ESPN.; "2020 Team Ranking". Rivals.; "Notre Dame 2020 Basketball Commits". 247Sports.

== Roster ==
2020–21 Notre Dame Fighting Irish men's basketball team
Players
Coaches

Pos.	#	Name	Height	Weight	Year	Previous school	Hometown
G	2	Trey Wertz	6 ft 5 in (1.96 m)	195 lb (88 kg)	Jr	Providence Day	Charlotte, NC
G	3	Prentiss Hubb	6 ft 3 in (1.91 m)	175 lb (79 kg)	Jr	Gonzaga	Upper Marlboro, MD
G	5	Cormac Ryan	6 ft 5 in (1.96 m)	190 lb (86 kg)	Jr	Milton Academy; Stanford	New York City, NY
F	11	Juwan Durham	6 ft 11 in (2.11 m)	223 lb (101 kg)	GS	Tampa Prep; Connecticut	Tampa, FL
G	12	Tony Sanders Jr.	6 ft 7 in (2.01 m)	202 lb (92 kg)	Fr	Gulliver Prep	Miami, FL
G	13	Nikola Djogo	6 ft 8 in (2.03 m)	230 lb (104 kg)	GS	Athlete Institute Prep	Hamilton, Ontario
F	14	Nate Laszewski	6 ft 10 in (2.08 m)	227 lb (103 kg)	Jr	Northfield Mount Hermon	Jupiter, FL
F	22	Elijah Taylor	6 ft 8 in (2.03 m)	231 lb (105 kg)	Fr	Imhotep	Philadelphia, PA
G	23	Dane Goodwin	6 ft 5 in (1.96 m)	200 lb (91 kg)	Jr	Upper Arlington	Upper Arlington, OH
G	24	Robby Carmody	6 ft 4 in (1.93 m)	215 lb (98 kg)	Jr	Mars Area	Mars, PA
F	25	Matt Zona	6 ft 9 in (2.06 m)	243 lb (110 kg)	Fr	Bergen Catholic	Blauvelt, NY
G	31	Elijah Morgan (W)	6 ft 0 in (1.83 m)	165 lb (75 kg)	So	Jesuit High School	New Orleans, LA

Head coach

- Mike Brey (George Washington)

Assistant coach(es)

- Rod Balanis (Georgia Tech)
- Ryan Humphrey (Notre Dame)
- Scott Martin (Notre Dame)

Legend

- (C) Team captain
- (S) Suspended
- (I) Ineligible
- (W) Walk-on
- Injured
- Current redshirt

Roster
Last update: November 23, 2020

== Schedule and results ==
Date time, TV	Rank^{#}	Opponent^{#}	Result	Record	High points	High rebounds	High assists	Site (attendance) city, state
Regular season
November 28, 2020*; 8:00 p.m., BTN		at No. 13 Michigan State	L 70–80	0–1	23 – Hubb	9 – Laszewski	4 – Goodwin	Breslin Center (0); East Lansing, MI
December 2, 2020*; 7:00 p.m., ACCRSN		Western Michigan	Canceled due to COVID-19 issues					Purcell Pavilion; Notre Dame, IN
December 5, 2020*; 11:00 a.m., ACCNX		Purdue Fort Wayne	Canceled due to COVID-19 issues					Purcell Pavilion; Notre Dame, IN
December 6, 2020*; 7:00 p.m., ACCN		Detroit Mercy	W 78–70	1–1	18 – Hubb	11 – Laszewski	8 – Hubb	Purcell Pavilion (84); Notre Dame, IN
December 8, 2020*; 7:30 p.m., ESPN2		No. 22 Ohio State; ACC–Big Ten Challenge	L 85–90	1–2	26 – Hubb	9 – Tied	6 – Hubb	Purcell Pavilion (156); Notre Dame, IN
December 12, 2020*; 12:00 p.m., CBS		at Kentucky	W 64–63	2–2	21 – Laszewski	9 – Laszewski	4 – Ryan	Rupp Arena (3,075); Lexington, KY
December 16, 2020; 9:00 p.m., ESPN		No. 21 Duke	L 65–75	2–3 (0–1)	25 – Goodwin	8 – Laszewski	3 – Tied	Purcell Pavilion (89); Notre Dame, IN
December 19, 2020*; 2:30 p.m., ESPN2		vs. Purdue; Crossroads Classic	L 78–88	2–4	27 – Wertz	6 – Tied	5 – Wertz	Bankers Life Fieldhouse (0); Indianapolis, IN
December 23, 2020*; 12:00 p.m.		Bellarmine	W 81–70	3–4	27 – Goodwin	8 – Laszewski	4 – Tied	Purcell Pavilion (82); Notre Dame, IN
December 30, 2020; 6:00 p.m., ACCN		No. 23 Virginia	L 57–66	3–5 (0–2)	28 – Laszewski	7 – Goodwin	8 – Hubb	Purcell Pavilion (86); Notre Dame, IN
January 2, 2021; 2:00 p.m., ACCN		at North Carolina	L 65–66	3–6 (0–3)	25 – Laszewski	9 – Laszewski	5 – Tied	Dean Smith Center (0); Chapel Hill, NC
January 6, 2021; 7:00 p.m., ACCRSN		Georgia Tech	Postponed due to COVID-19 issues					Purcell Pavilion; Notre Dame, IN
January 10, 2021; 6:00 p.m., ACCN		at No. 19 Virginia Tech	L 63–77	3–7 (0–4)	17 – Laszewski	7 – Ryan	6 – Hubb	Cassell Coliseum (250); Blacksburg, VA
January 13, 2021; 4:30 p.m., ACCN		at No. 18 Virginia	L 68–80	3–8 (0–5)	16 – Ryan	8 – Laszewski	4 – Wertz	John Paul Jones Arena (250); Charlottesville, VA
January 16, 2021; 4:00 p.m., ACCN		Boston College	W 80–70	4–8 (1–5)	21 – Goodwin	11 – Durham	10 – Hubb	Purcell Pavilion (78); Notre Dame, IN
January 18, 2021*; 2:30 p.m., FOX		at Howard	Canceled due to COVID-19 issues					Burr Gymnasium; Washington, D.C.
January 24, 2021; 6:00 p.m., ACCN		at Miami (FL)	W 73–59	5–8 (2–5)	21 – Laszewski	10 – Laszewski	9 – Hubb	Watsco Center (0); Coral Gables, FL
January 27, 2021; 7:00 p.m., ACCRSN		No. 20 Virginia Tech	L 51–62	5–9 (2–6)	22 – Hubb	10 – Laszewski	3 – Hubb	Purcell Pavilion (103); Notre Dame, IN
January 30, 2021; 8:00 p.m., ACCN		at Pittsburgh	W 84–58	6–9 (3–6)	19 – Ryan	9 – Tied	9 – Hubb	Petersen Events Center (500); Pittsburgh, PA
February 2, 2021; 5:00 p.m., ACCN		Wake Forest	W 79–58	7–9 (4–6)	18 – Durham	10 – Laszewski	10 – Hubb	Purcell Pavilion (123); Notre Dame, IN
February 6, 2021; 8:00 p.m., ACCN		at Georgia Tech	L 80–82	7–10 (4–7)	27 – Laszewski	7 – Tied	10 – Hubb	McCamish Pavilion (1,200); Atlanta, GA
February 9, 2021; 4:30 p.m., ACCN		at Duke	W 93–89	8–10 (5–7)	28 – Ryan	7 – Goodwin	8 – Hubb	Cameron Indoor Stadium (0); Durham, NC
February 14, 2021; 6:00 p.m., ACCN		Miami (FL)	W 71–61	9–10 (6–7)	18 – Djogo	11 – Goodwin	5 – Hubb	Purcell Pavilion (114); Notre Dame, IN
February 17, 2021; 7:00 p.m., ACCRSN		Clemson	Postponed due to COVID-19 issues					Purcell Pavilion; Notre Dame, IN
February 20, 2021; 2:00 p.m., ACCN		at Syracuse	L 67–75	9–11 (6–8)	17 – Wertz	12 – Laszewski	10 – Hubb	Carrier Dome (0); Syracuse, NY
February 23, 2021; 7:00 p.m., ACCN		at Louisville	L 57–69	9–12 (6–9)	18 – Durham	8 – Ryan	6 – Hubb	KFC Yum! Center (2,948); Louisville, KY
February 27, 2021; 2:00 p.m., ACCN		at Boston College	L 90–94	9–13 (6–10)	28 – Hubb	9 – Laszewski	7 – Hubb	Conte Forum (0); Chestnut Hill, MA
March 3, 2021; 7:00 p.m., ACCN		NC State	L 69–80	9–14 (6–11)	14 – Hubb	9 – Tied	4 – Tied	Purcell Pavilion (497); Notre Dame, IN
March 6, 2021; 12:00 p.m., ESPN2		No. 11 Florida State	W 83–73	10–14 (7–11)	22 – Hubb	9 – Tied	5 – Hubb	Purcell Pavilion (646); Notre Dame, IN
ACC tournament
March 9, 2021; 7:00 p.m., ACCN	(11)	vs. (14) Wake Forest; First round	W 80–77	11–14	16 – Tied	10 – Durham	4 – Hubb	Greensboro Coliseum (2,820); Greensboro, NC
March 10, 2021; 9:00 p.m., ACCN	(11)	vs. (6) North Carolina; Second round	L 59–101	11–15	13 – Tied	6 – Durham	3 – Hubb	Greensboro Coliseum (2,820); Greensboro, NC
*Non-conference game. ^{#}Rankings from AP Poll. (#) Tournament seedings in parentheses. All times are in Eastern Time.

== Rankings ==
Ranking movements Legend: — = Not ranked
	Week																	
Poll	Pre	1	2	3	4	5	6	7	8	9	10	11	12	13	14	15	16	Final
AP	—	—	—	—	—	—	—	—	—	—	—	—	—	—	—	—	—	Not released
Coaches	—	—	—	—	—	—	—	—	—	—	—	—	—	—	—	—	—	—

*AP does not release post-NCAA Tournament rankings
