= 2020–21 Wake Forest Demon Deacons men's basketball team =

American college basketball season

2020–21 Wake Forest Demon Deacons men's basketball
- Conference: Atlantic Coast Conference
- Record: 6–16 (3–15 ACC)
- Head coach: Steve Forbes (1st season)
- Assistant coaches: Randolph Childress; BJ McKie; Brooks Savage
- Home arena: LJVM Coliseum

2020–21 ACC men's basketball standings
	Conf.				Overall
Team	W		L	PCT	W		L	PCT
No. 15 Virginia	13	–	4	.765	18	–	7	.720
No. 14 Florida State	11	–	4	.733	18	–	7	.720
No. 25 Virginia Tech	9	–	4	.692	15	–	7	.682
Georgia Tech †	11	–	6	.647	17	–	9	.654
Clemson	10	–	6	.625	16	–	8	.667
North Carolina	10	–	6	.625	18	–	11	.621
Louisville	8	–	5	.615	13	–	7	.650
Syracuse	9	–	7	.563	18	–	10	.643
NC State	9	–	8	.529	14	–	11	.560
Duke	9	–	9	.500	13	–	11	.542
Notre Dame	7	–	11	.389	11	–	15	.423
Pittsburgh	6	–	10	.375	10	–	12	.455
Miami (FL)	4	–	15	.211	10	–	17	.370
Wake Forest	3	–	15	.167	6	–	16	.273
Boston College	2	–	11	.154	4	–	16	.200
† 2021 ACC tournament winner Rankings from AP poll

The 2020-21 Wake Forest Demon Deacons men's basketball team represented Wake Forest University during the 2020–21 NCAA Division I men's basketball season. The Demon Deacons were led by first-year head coach Steve Forbes and played their home games at the Lawrence Joel Veterans Memorial Coliseum in Winston-Salem, North Carolina as members of the Atlantic Coast Conference.

The Demon Deacons finished the season 6–16, 3–15 in ACC play, to finish in fourteenth place. They lost to Notre Dame in the first round of the ACC tournament. They were not invited to either the NCAA tournament or NIT.

== Previous season ==
The Demon Deacons finished 2019–20 season 13–17, 6–14 in ACC play to finish in a tie for 13th place. They lost to Pittsburgh in the first round of the ACC tournament. The tournament was cancelled before the Quarterfinals due to the COVID-19 pandemic. The NCAA tournament and NIT were also cancelled due to the pandemic.

After the season head coach Danny Manning was fired after six seasons, where he posted a 78–111 record. On April 30, 2020, the Demon Deacons hired Steve Forbes as his replacement.

== Offseason ==
=== Departures ===
Name	Number	Pos.	Height	Weight	Year	Hometown	Reason for departure
Brandon Childress	0	G	6'0"	195	Senior	Winston-Salem, NC	Graduated
Sharone Wright Jr.	2	G	6'5"	185	Sophomore	Florence, SC	Transferred to Morgan State
Torry Johnson	11	G	6'3"	175	Graduate Student	Chicago, IL	Graduated
Andrien White	13	G	6'3"	200	(redshirt) Senior	Richmond, VA	Graduated
Michael Wynn	20	G	6'6"	210	Sophomore	Albany, NY	Entered transfer portal
Chaundee Brown	23	G	6'5"	220	Junior	Orlando, FL	Transferred to Michigan
Olivier Sarr	30	C	7'0"	255	Junior	Toulouse, France	Transferred to Kentucky

=== Incoming transfers ===
Name	Number	Pos.	Height	Weight	Year	Hometown	Previous School
Jalen Johnson	2	G	6'6"	195	Graduate Student	Durham, NC	Tennessee
Daivien Williamson	4	G	6'2"	170	Junior	Winston-Salem, NC	ETSU
Ian DuBose	11	G	6'4"	225	Graduate Student	Durham, NC	Houston Baptist
Jonah Antonio	20	G	6'5"	195	Graduate Student	Perth, Australia	UNLV
Isaiah Wilkins	23	G	6'4"	220	Junior	Winston-Salem, NC	Virginia Tech

=== 2020 recruiting class ===
College recruiting information
Name	Hometown	School	Height	Weight	Commit date
Marcus Watson Jr. PG	Chicago, IL	Morgan Park High School	5 ft 11 in (1.80 m)	155 lb (70 kg)	Aug 20, 2019
Marcus Watson Jr. PG	Recruit ratings: Scout: Rivals: 247Sports: ESPN: (79)				
Jaylon Gibson; PF	Raleigh, NC	Grace Academy	6 ft 11 in (2.11 m)	190 lb (86 kg)	Aug 2, 2019
Jaylon Gibson; PF	Recruit ratings: Scout: Rivals: 247Sports: ESPN: (78)				
Djimon Bailey; SG	Raleigh, NC	Grace Academy	6 ft 5 in (1.96 m)	170 lb (77 kg)	May 6, 2019
Djimon Bailey; SG	Recruit ratings: Scout: Rivals: 247Sports: ESPN: (78)				
Quadry Adams; PG	Edison, NJ	St. Thomas Aquinas	6 ft 3 in (1.91 m)	170 lb (77 kg)	Sep 8, 2019
Quadry Adams; PG	Recruit ratings: No ratings found				
Overall recruit ranking:
Note: In many cases, Scout, Rivals, 247Sports, On3, and ESPN may conflict in their listings of height and weight.; In these cases, the average was taken. ESPN grades are on a 100-point scale.; Sources: "Wake Forest Demon Deacons". ESPN.; "2020 Team Ranking". Rivals.

== Roster ==
2020–21 Wake Forest Demon Deacons men's basketball team
Players
Coaches

Pos.	#	Name	Height	Weight	Year	Previous school	Hometown
G	0	Jahcobi Neath	6 ft 3 in (1.91 m)	200 lb (91 kg)	So	Crestwood Prep	Toronto, ON
F	1	Isaiah Mucius	6 ft 8 in (2.03 m)	200 lb (91 kg)	Jr	Brewster Academy	East Patchogue, NY
G	2	Jalen Johnson	6 ft 6 in (1.98 m)	195 lb (88 kg)	GS	Wesleyan Christian Academy; Tennessee	Durham, NC
G	4	Daivien Williamson	6 ft 2 in (1.88 m)	170 lb (77 kg)	Jr	Winston-Salem Prep; ETSU	Winston-Salem, NC
F	10	Tariq Ingraham	6 ft 9 in (2.06 m)	255 lb (116 kg)	RS Fr	Bonner-Prendergast	Philadelphia, PA
G	11	Ian DuBose	6 ft 4 in (1.93 m)	225 lb (102 kg)	GS	Ravenscroft School; Houston Baptist	Durham, NC
G	13	Quadry Adams	6 ft 3 in (1.91 m)	190 lb (86 kg)	Fr	St. Thomas Aquinas	Piscataway, NJ
G	20	Jonah Antonio	6 ft 5 in (1.96 m)	195 lb (88 kg)	GS	South Plains College; UNLV	Perth, Australia
G	23	Isaiah Wilikins	6 ft 4 in (1.93 m)	220 lb (100 kg)	Jr	Mount Tabor; Virginia Tech	Winston-Salem, NC
F	25	Ismael Massoud	6 ft 8 in (2.03 m)	220 lb (100 kg)	So	MacDuffie School	East Harlem, NY
C	30	Emmanuel Okpomoy	6 ft 10 in (2.08 m)	225 lb (102 kg)	Fr	Oak Hill Academy	Jackson, MS
F	31	Blake Buchanan	6 ft 5 in (1.96 m)	205 lb (93 kg)	Jr	Voyager Academy	Durham, NC
F	33	Ody Oguama	6 ft 9 in (2.06 m)	225 lb (102 kg)	So	Woodstock Academy	Raleigh, NC
F	34	Sunday Okeke (W)	6 ft 8 in (2.03 m)	250 lb (113 kg)	Sr	Greens Farms Academy	Lagos, Nigeria
G	35	Carter Whitt	6 ft 4 in (1.93 m)	180 lb (82 kg)	Fr	Leesville Road	Raleigh, NC
G	45	Anthony Mathis Jr. (W)	6 ft 1 in (1.85 m)	185 lb (84 kg)	Sr	Kentucky Country Day	Louisville, KY
F	52	Grant van Beveren (W)	6 ft 6 in (1.98 m)	215 lb (98 kg)	So	Chattahoochee	Alpharetta, GA
G	55	Miles Lester (W)	6 ft 0 in (1.83 m)	180 lb (82 kg)	RS Jr	Wilbraham & Monson Academy; Rice	Wichita, KS

Head coach

- Steve Forbes (Southern Arkansas University)

Assistant coach(es)

- Randolph Childress (Wake Forest)
- Brooks Savage (Tennessee)
- BJ McKie (South Carolina)

Legend

- (C) Team captain
- (S) Suspended
- (I) Ineligible
- (W) Walk-on
- Injured
- Current redshirt

Roster
Last update: November 30, 2020

== Schedule and results ==
Date time, TV	Rank^{#}	Opponent^{#}	Result	Record	High points	High rebounds	High assists	Site (attendance) city, state
Regular season
November 25, 2020*; 4:00 p.m., ACCNX		Delaware State	W 111–51	1–0	19 – Ingraham	7 – Johnson	4 – DuBose	LJVM Coliseum (0); Winston-Salem, NC
November 27, 2020*; 7:00 p.m., ACCN		Longwood	W 71–60	2–0	14 – Tied	4 – DuBose	5 – DuBose	LJVM Coliseum (0); Winston-Salem, NC
December 2, 2020*		Troy	Canceled due to COVID-19 issues					LJVM Coliseum; Winston-Salem, NC
December 13, 2020*; 6:00 p.m., ACCN		Presbyterian	Canceled due to COVID-19 issues					LJVM Coliseum; Winston-Salem, NC
December 16, 2020; 8:00 p.m., ACCN		No. 17 Virginia	Postponed due to COVID-19 issues					LJVM Coliseum; Winston-Salem, NC
December 21, 2020*; 7:00 p.m., ACCRSN		VMI	Canceled due to COVID-19 issues					LJVM Coliseum; Winston-Salem, NC
December 30, 2020; 5:00 p.m., ESPN2		Syracuse	Postponed due to COVID-19 issues					LJVM Coliseum; Winston-Salem, NC
December 31, 2020*; 3:00 p.m., ACCN		Catawba	W 70–62	3–0	15 – Williamson	7 – Tied	4 – Tied	LJVM Coliseum (77); Winston-Salem, NC
January 3, 2021; 6:00 p.m., ACCN		at Georgia Tech	L 54–70	3–1 (0–1)	24 – Mucius	5 – Tied	4 – Williamson	McCamish Pavilion (1,200); Atlanta, GA
January 6, 2021; 9:00 p.m., ACCRSN		at No. 22 Virginia	L 61–70	3–2 (0–2)	14 – Tied	7 – Mucius	4 – Williamson	John Paul Jones Arena (250); Charlottesville, VA
January 9, 2021; 12:00 p.m., ACCN		at No. 21 Duke	L 68–79	3–3 (0–3)	17 – Tied	8 – Massoud	3 – Whitt	Cameron Indoor Stadium (0); Durham, NC
January 13, 2021; 8:30 p.m., ACCN		No. 16 Louisville	L 65–77	3–4 (0–4)	19 – Williamson	8 – Mucius	4 – Williamson	LJVM Coliseum (71); Winston-Salem, NC
January 17, 2021; 6:00 p.m., ACCN		No. 20 Virginia Tech	L 60–64	3–5 (0–5)	12 – Massoud	6 – Mucius	2 – Tied	LJVM Coliseum (89); Winston-Salem, NC
January 20, 2021; 7:00 p.m., ACCN		at North Carolina	L 73–80	3–6 (0–6)	27 – Tied	7 – Tied	5 – Williamson	Dean Smith Center (0); Chapel Hill, NC
January 23, 2021; 6:00 p.m., ACCN		Pittsburgh	W 76–75	4–6 (1–6)	31 – Massoud	10 – Oguama	8 – Williamson	LJVM Coliseum (79); Winston-Salem, NC
January 27, 2021; 8:00 p.m., ACCN		at NC State; Rivalry	L 67–72	4–7 (1–7)	22 – Williamson	7 – Massoud	3 – Neath	PNC Arena (25); Raleigh, NC
January 30, 2021; 2:00 p.m., ACCN		Miami (FL)	W 66–54	5–7 (2–7)	16 – Williamson	12 – Oguama	3 – Neath	LJVM Coliseum (82); Winston-Salem, NC
February 2, 2021; 5:00 p.m., ACCN		at Notre Dame	L 58–79	5–8 (2–8)	14 – Mucius	6 – Oguama	4 – Williamson	Purcell Pavilion (123); Notre Dame, IN
February 10, 2021; 7:00 p.m., ACCN		at Boston College	W 69–65	6–8 (3–8)	17 – DuBose	10 – Oguama	3 – DuBose	Conte Forum (0); Chestnut Hill, MA
February 13, 2021; 12:00 p.m., ACCRSN		at No. 17 Florida State	L 85–92 ^{OT}	6–9 (3–9)	23 – Antonio	8 – Antonio	5 – DuBose	Donald L. Tucker Center (2,950); Tallahassee, FL
February 17, 2021; 8:30 p.m., ACCN		Duke	L 60–84	6–10 (3–10)	14 – Oguama	8 – DuBose	2 – Tied	LJVM Coliseum (102); Winston-Salem, NC
February 20, 2021; 2:00 p.m., ACCRSN		NC State	L 62–80	6–11 (3–11)	14 – DuBose	5 – Massoud	2 – Tied	LJVM Coliseum (116); Winston-Salem, NC
February 24, 2021; 4:30 p.m., ACCN		Clemson	L 39–60	6–12 (3–12)	16 – Williamson	4 – Tied	2 – Whitt	LJVM Coliseum (70); Winston-Salem, NC
February 27, 2021; 12:00 p.m., ACCN		at No. 16 Virginia Tech	L 46–84	6–13 (3–13)	12 – Antonio	7 – Oguama	4 – Williamson	Cassell Coliseum (250); Blacksburg, VA
March 2, 2021; 6:00 p.m., ACCN		at Pittsburgh	L 57–70	6–14 (3–14)	17 – Williamson	7 – DuBose	4 – Williamson	Petersen Events Center (500); Pittsburgh, PA
March 5, 2021; 8:00 p.m., ACCN		Georgia Tech	L 63–75	6–15 (3–15)	18 – DuBose	5 – Massoud	4 – Whitt	LJVM Coliseum (1,229); Winston-Salem, NC
ACC tournament
March 9, 2021; 7:00 p.m., ACCN	(14)	vs. (11) Notre Dame; First round	L 77–80	6–16	21 – Williamson	12 – Mucius	7 – Whitt	Greensboro Coliseum (2,820); Greensboro, NC
*Non-conference game. ^{#}Rankings from AP Poll. (#) Tournament seedings in parentheses. All times are in Eastern Time.

== Rankings ==
Ranking movements Legend: — = Not ranked
	Week																	
Poll	Pre	1	2	3	4	5	6	7	8	9	10	11	12	13	14	15	16	Final
AP	—	—	—	—	—	—	—	—	—	—	—	—	—	—	—	—	—	Not released
Coaches	—	—	—	—	—	—	—	—	—	—	—	—	—	—	—	—	—	—

*AP does not release post-NCAA tournament rankings
^Coaches did not release a Week 2 poll.
