= 2020–21 Virginia Tech Hokies men's basketball team =

American college basketball season

2020–21 Virginia Tech Hokies men's basketball
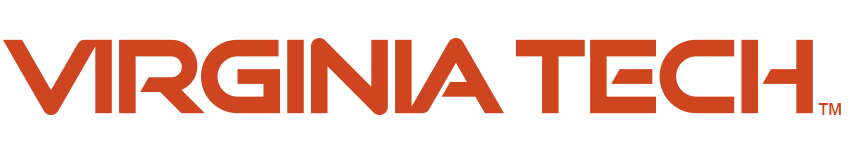

Hall of Fame Tip Off Champions

NCAA tournament, first round
- Conference: Atlantic Coast Conference

Ranking
- AP: No. 25
- Record: 15–7 (9–4 ACC)
- Head coach: Mike Young (2nd season)
- Assistant coaches: Chester Frazier; Christian Webster; Kevin Giltner
- Home arena: Cassell Coliseum

2020–21 ACC men's basketball standings
| | Conf. | | | | Overall |
| Team | W | | L | PCT | W | | L | PCT |
|---|---|---|---|---|---|---|---|---|
| No. 15 Virginia | 13 | – | 4 | .765 | 18 | – | 7 | .720 |
| No. 14 Florida State | 11 | – | 4 | .733 | 18 | – | 7 | .720 |
| No. 25 Virginia Tech | 9 | – | 4 | .692 | 15 | – | 7 | .682 |
| Georgia Tech † | 11 | – | 6 | .647 | 17 | – | 9 | .654 |
| Clemson | 10 | – | 6 | .625 | 16 | – | 8 | .667 |
| North Carolina | 10 | – | 6 | .625 | 18 | – | 11 | .621 |
| Louisville | 8 | – | 5 | .615 | 13 | – | 7 | .650 |
| Syracuse | 9 | – | 7 | .563 | 18 | – | 10 | .643 |
| NC State | 9 | – | 8 | .529 | 14 | – | 11 | .560 |
| Duke | 9 | – | 9 | .500 | 13 | – | 11 | .542 |
| Notre Dame | 7 | – | 11 | .389 | 11 | – | 15 | .423 |
| Pittsburgh | 6 | – | 10 | .375 | 10 | – | 12 | .455 |
| Miami (FL) | 4 | – | 15 | .211 | 10 | – | 17 | .370 |
| Wake Forest | 3 | – | 15 | .167 | 6 | – | 16 | .273 |
| Boston College | 2 | – | 11 | .154 | 4 | – | 16 | .200 |
† 2021 ACC tournament winner Rankings from AP poll

The 2020–21 Virginia Tech Hokies men's basketball team represented Virginia Polytechnic Institute and State University during the 2020–21 NCAA Division I men's basketball season. The Hokies were led by second-year head coach Mike Young and played their home games at Cassell Coliseum in Blacksburg, Virginia, as members of the Atlantic Coast Conference. In a season limited due to the ongoing COVID-19 pandemic, the Hokies finished the season 15–7, 9–4 in ACC play, to finish in third place. They lost to North Carolina in the quarterfinals of the ACC tournament after earning a double-bye into the quarterfinals. They received an at-large bid to the NCAA tournament as the No. 10 seed in the South Region where they lost to Florida in the first round.

== Previous season ==
The Hokies finished the 2019–20 season 16–16, 7–13 in ACC play to finish in a tie for 10th place. They lost to North Carolina in the first round of the ACC tournament. The tournament was thereafter canceled due to the ongoing COVID-19 pandemic. The NCAA tournament and all other postseason tournaments were also cancelled due to the pandemic.

== Offseason ==
=== Departures ===
| Name | Number | Pos. | Height | Weight | Year | Hometown | Reason for departure |
|---|---|---|---|---|---|---|---|
| Isaiah Wilkins | 1 | G | 6'4" | 225 | Sophomore | Winston-Salem, NC | Transferred to Wake Forest |
| Landers Nolley II | 2 | G/F | 6'7" | 225 | (redshirt) Freshman | Atlanta, GA | Transferred to Memphis |
| Jonathan Kabongo | 10 | G | 6'4" | 195 | Sophomore | Toronto, Canada | Retired due to injury |
| Brendan Palmer | 11 | G | 6'4" | 195 | Sophomore | Winston-Salem, NC | Entered Transfer Portal |
| P. J. Horne | 14 | F | 6'6" | 225 | Junior | Tifton, GA | Transferred to Georgia |
| Branden Johnson | 24 | G | 6'8" | 230 | Graduate student | Garfield Heights, OH | Graduated |
| Ryan Payne | 25 | F | 6'8" | 220 | Junior | Mechanicsville, VA | — |

=== Incoming transfers ===
| Name | Number | Pos. | Height | Weight | Year | Hometown | Previous school |
|---|---|---|---|---|---|---|---|
| Cartier Diarra | 2 | G | 6'4" | 185 | Graduate student | Florence, SC | Kansas State |
| Justyn Mutts | 25 | F | 6'7" | 230 | (redshirt) Junior | Millville, NJ | Delaware |
| Cordell Pemsl | 35 | F | 6'9" | 250 | Graduate student | Dubuque, IA | Iowa |

=== 2020 recruiting class ===
College recruiting information
| Name | Hometown | School | Height | Weight | Commit date |
|---|---|---|---|---|---|
| Joe Bamisile; PG / SG | Richmond, Virginia | Monacan High School | 6 ft 4 in (1.93 m) | 195 lb (88 kg) | Jul 25, 2019 |
| Joe Bamisile; PG / SG | Recruit ratings: 247Sports: ESPN: (83) | | | | |
| Darius Maddox; SG | Bowie, Maryland | Oak Hill Academy | 6 ft 4 in (1.93 m) | 180 lb (82 kg) | Aug 16, 2019 |
| Darius Maddox; SG | Recruit ratings: 247Sports: ESPN: (81) | | | | |
| David N'Guessan; PF | Baltimore, Maryland | Mt. Zion Prep | 6 ft 8 in (2.03 m) | 195 lb (88 kg) | Mar 19, 2020 |
| David N'Guessan; PF | Recruit ratings: 247Sports: | | | | |
Overall recruit ranking:
Note: In many cases, Scout, Rivals, 247Sports, On3, and ESPN may conflict in their listings of height and weight.; In these cases, the average was taken. ESPN grades are on a 100-point scale.; Sources: "Virginia Tech Hokies". ESPN.; "2020 Team Ranking". Rivals.

== Roster ==
2020–21 Virginia Tech Hokies men's basketball team
Players
Coaches

| Pos. | # | Name | Height | Weight | Year | Previous school | Hometown |
|---|---|---|---|---|---|---|---|
| G | 0 | Hunter Cattoor | 6 ft 3 in (1.91 m) | 200 lb (91 kg) | So | Bishop Moore | Orlando, FL |
| G | 1 | Joe Bamisile | 6 ft 4 in (1.93 m) | 195 lb (88 kg) | Fr | Monacan | Chesterfield, VA |
| G | 2 | Cartier Diarra | 6 ft 4 in (1.93 m) | 185 lb (84 kg) | GS | Kansas State | Florence, SC |
| G | 3 | Wabissa Bede | 6 ft 1 in (1.85 m) | 195 lb (88 kg) | GS | Cushing Academy | North Andover, MA |
| G | 4 | Nahiem Alleyne | 6 ft 4 in (1.93 m) | 195 lb (88 kg) | So | Mountain View | Buford, GA |
| F | 5 | David N'Guessan | 6 ft 9 in (2.06 m) | 205 lb (93 kg) | Fr | Mt. Zion Prep | De Lier, Netherlands |
| F | 10 | Grant Yates (W) | 6 ft 8 in (2.03 m) | 205 lb (93 kg) | RS So | Christopher Newport | Gainesville, VA |
| F | 11 | Gill Williamson (W) | 6 ft 8 in (2.03 m) | 195 lb (88 kg) | Fr | St. Christopher's | Richmond, VA |
| G | 13 | Dairus Maddox | 6 ft 5 in (1.96 m) | 185 lb (84 kg) | Fr | Oak Hill Academy | Bowie, MD |
| G | 15 | Jalen Cone | 5 ft 10 in (1.78 m) | 165 lb (75 kg) | So | Walkertown | Walkertown, NC |
| F | 21 | John Ojiako | 6 ft 10 in (2.08 m) | 245 lb (111 kg) | So | Admiral Farragut | Lagos, Nigeria |
| F | 22 | Keve Aluma | 6 ft 9 in (2.06 m) | 235 lb (107 kg) | RS Jr | Wofford | Berlin, MD |
| G | 23 | Tyrece Radford | 6 ft 2 in (1.88 m) | 200 lb (91 kg) | RS So | McKinley | Baton Rouge, LA |
| F | 25 | Justyn Mutts | 6 ft 7 in (2.01 m) | 230 lb (104 kg) | RS Jr | Delaware | Millville, NJ |
| F | 35 | Cordell Pemsl | 6 ft 9 in (2.06 m) | 250 lb (113 kg) | GS | Iowa | Dubuque, IA |

Head coach

- Mike Young (Emory & Henry)

Assistant coach(es)

- Chester Frazier (Illinois)
- Christian Webster (Harvard)
- Kevin Giltner (Wofford)

Legend

- (C) Team captain
- (S) Suspended
- (I) Ineligible
- (W) Walk-on
- Injured
- Current redshirt

Roster
Last update: November 28, 2020

== Schedule and results ==
| Date time, TV | Rank^{#} | Opponent^{#} | Result | Record | High points | High rebounds | High assists | Site (attendance) city, state |
Regular season
| November 25, 2020*; 12:00 p.m., ACCNX | | Radford | W 77–62 | 1–0 | 19 – Aluma | 7 – Bamisile | 5 – Radford | Cassell Coliseum (250); Blacksburg, VA |
| November 28, 2020*; 8:00 p.m., ESPNU | | vs. No. 3 Villanova; Hall of Fame Tip Off | W 81–73 ^{OT} | 2–0 | 23 – Aluma | 13 – Radford | 5 – Radford | Mohegan Sun Arena (0); Uncasville, CT |
| November 29, 2020*; 8:00 p.m., ESPN2 | | vs. South Florida; Hall of Fame Tip Off | W 76–58 | 3–0 | 21 – Radford | 9 – Mutts | 3 – Tied | Mohegan Sun Arena (0); Uncasville, CT |
| December 3, 2020*; 8:00 p.m., ACCN | No. 16 | VMI | W 64–57 | 4–0 | 17 – Aluma | 12 – Aluma | 6 – Mutts | Cassell Coliseum (250); Blacksburg, VA |
| December 8, 2020*; 9:00 p.m., ESPNU | No. 15 | Penn State; ACC–Big Ten Challenge | L 55–75 | 4–1 | 11 – Cone | 12 – Aluma | 3 – Radford | Cassell Coliseum (250); Blacksburg, VA |
| December 15, 2020; 6:30 p.m., ACCN | | No. 24 Clemson | W 66–60 | 5–1 (1–0) | 15 – Radford | 6 – Cattoor | 3 – Mutts | Cassell Coliseum (250); Blacksburg, VA |
| December 19, 2020*; 5:30 p.m., ACCRSN | | Coppin State | W 97–57 | 6–1 | 18 – Tied | 7 – Aluma | 5 – Tied | Cassell Coliseum (250); Blacksburg, VA |
| December 21, 2020*; 8:00 p.m., ACCN | No. 24 | Longwood | W 84–58 | 7–1 | 14 – Aluma | 8 – Radford | 8 – Bede | Cassell Coliseum (250); Blacksburg, VA |
| December 29, 2020; 6:00 p.m., ACCN | No. 24 | Miami (FL) | W 80–78 | 8–1 (2–0) | 26 – Aluma | 9 – Mutts | 4 – Aluma | Cassell Coliseum (250); Blacksburg, VA |
| January 2, 2021; 4:00 p.m., ACCN | No. 24 | at No. 23 Virginia; Commonwealth Classic | Postponed | | | | | John Paul Jones Arena; Charlottesville, Virginia |
| January 6, 2021; 6:30 p.m., ACCN | No. 19 | at Louisville | L 71–73 | 8–2 (2–1) | 23 – Cone | 8 – Mutts | 3 – Tied | KFC Yum! Center (2,966); Louisville, KY |
| January 10, 2021; 6:00 p.m., ACCN | No. 19 | Notre Dame | W 77–63 | 9–2 (3–1) | 18 – Cone | 12 – Aluma | 2 – Tied | Cassell Coliseum (250); Blacksburg, VA |
| January 12, 2021; 7:00 p.m., ACCN | No. 20 | No. 19 Duke | W 74–67 | 10–2 (4–1) | 18 – Radford | 12 – Radford | 5 – Radford | Cassell Coliseum (250); Blacksburg, VA |
| January 17, 2021; 6:00 p.m., ACCN | No. 20 | at Wake Forest | W 64–60 | 11–2 (5–1) | 20 – Radford | 11 – Aluma | 2 – Tied | LJVM Coliseum (89); Winston-Salem, NC |
| January 20, 2021; 7:00 p.m., ACCN | No. 16 | Boston College | Postponed | | | | | Cassell Coliseum; Blacksburg, VA |
| January 23, 2021; 12:00 p.m., ACCRSN | No. 16 | at Syracuse | L 60–78 | 11–3 (5–2) | 20 – Alleyne | 8 – Mutts | 4 – Aluma | Carrier Dome (0); Syracuse, NY |
| January 27, 2021; 7:00 p.m., ACCRSN | No. 20 | at Notre Dame | W 62–51 | 12–3 (6–2) | 15 – Alleyne | 12 – Aluma | 5 – Alleyne | Purcell Pavilion (103); Notre Dame, IN |
| January 30, 2021; 6:00 p.m., ACCN | No. 20 | No. 8 Virginia; Commonwealth Classic | W 65–51 | 13–3 (7–2) | 29 – Aluma | 10 – Aluma | 5 – Bede | Cassell Coliseum (250); Blacksburg, VA |
| February 3, 2021; 7:00 p.m., ACCRSN | No. 16 | at Pittsburgh | L 72–83 | 13–4 (7–3) | 30 – Aluma | 10 – Aluma | 5 – Tied | Peterson Events Center (500); Pittsburgh, PA |
| February 6, 2021; 12:00 p.m., ACCRSN | No. 16 | at Miami (FL) | W 80–76 ^{OT} | 14–4 (8–3) | 22 – Mutts | 9 – Mutts | 7 – Mutts | Watsco Center (0); Coral Gables, FL |
| February 9, 2021; 8:30 p.m., ACCN | No. 18 | No. 17 Florida State | Postponed | | | | | Cassell Coliseum; Blacksburg, VA |
| February 16, 2021; 7:00 p.m., ACCN | No. 18 | at North Carolina | Postponed | | | | | Dean Smith Center; Chapel Hill, NC |
| February 20, 2021; 12:00 p.m., ACCN | No. 18 | at No. 16 Florida State | Postponed | | | | | Donald L. Tucker Center; Tallahassee, FL |
| February 23, 2021; 7:00 p.m., ACCNX | No. 16 | Georgia Tech | L 53–69 | 14–5 (8–4) | 12 – Tied | 14 – Aluma | 5 – Aluma | Cassell Coliseum (250); Blacksburg, VA |
| February 27, 2021; 12:00 p.m., ACCN | No. 16 | Wake Forest | W 84–46 | 15–5 (9–4) | 23 – Aluma | 8 – Aluma | 5 – Tied | Cassell Coliseum (250); Blacksburg, VA |
| March 3, 2021; 7:00 p.m., ESPN2 | No. 22 | Louisville | Canceled | | | | | Cassell Coliseum; Blacksburg, VA |
| March 6, 2021; 2:00 p.m., ACCRSN | No. 22 | at NC State | Canceled | | | | | PNC Arena; Raleigh, NC |
ACC tournament
| March 11, 2021; 9:00 p.m., ESPN | (3) No. 22 | vs. (6) North Carolina; Quarterfinals | L 73–81 | 15–6 | 24 – Mutts | 8 – Tied | 7 – Bede | Greensboro Coliseum (2,820); Greensboro, NC |
NCAA tournament
| March 19, 2021*; 12:15 p.m., CBS | (10 S) No. 25 | vs. (7 S) Florida; First Round | L 70–75 ^{OT} | 15–7 | 28 – Alleyne | 7 – Aluma | 4 – Mutts | Hinkle Fieldhouse; Indianapolis, IN |
*Non-conference game. ^{#}Rankings from AP Poll. (#) Tournament seedings in parentheses. S=South. All times are in Eastern Time.

== Rankings ==
Ranking movements Legend: ██ Increase in ranking ██ Decrease in ranking — = Not ranked RV = Received votes т = Tied with team above or below
| | Week | | | | | | | | | | | | | | | | | |
| Poll | Pre | 1 | 2 | 3 | 4 | 5 | 6 | 7 | 8 | 9 | 10 | 11 | 12 | 13 | 14 | 15 | 16 | Final |
|---|---|---|---|---|---|---|---|---|---|---|---|---|---|---|---|---|---|---|
| AP | — | 16 | 15 | RV | 24 | 24 | 19т | 20 | 16 | 20 | 16 | 18 | 18 | 16 | 22 | 22 | 25 | Not released |
| Coaches | — | —^ | 15 | RV | RV | RV | 20 | 20 | 14 | 19 | 16 | 17т | 17 | 15 | 19 | 21 | 24 | RV |

*AP does not release post-NCAA tournament rankings
^Coaches did not release a Week 1 poll.
