= 2020–21 Louisville Cardinals men's basketball team =

American college basketball season

2020–21 Louisville Cardinals men's basketball
- Conference: Atlantic Coast Conference
- Record: 13–7 (8–5 ACC)
- Head coach: Chris Mack (3rd season)
- Assistant coaches: Dino Gaudio; Luke Murray; Mike Pegues
- Home arena: KFC Yum! Center

2020–21 ACC men's basketball standings
	Conf.				Overall
Team	W		L	PCT	W		L	PCT
No. 15 Virginia	13	–	4	.765	18	–	7	.720
No. 14 Florida State	11	–	4	.733	18	–	7	.720
No. 25 Virginia Tech	9	–	4	.692	15	–	7	.682
Georgia Tech †	11	–	6	.647	17	–	9	.654
Clemson	10	–	6	.625	16	–	8	.667
North Carolina	10	–	6	.625	18	–	11	.621
Louisville	8	–	5	.615	13	–	7	.650
Syracuse	9	–	7	.563	18	–	10	.643
NC State	9	–	8	.529	14	–	11	.560
Duke	9	–	9	.500	13	–	11	.542
Notre Dame	7	–	11	.389	11	–	15	.423
Pittsburgh	6	–	10	.375	10	–	12	.455
Miami (FL)	4	–	15	.211	10	–	17	.370
Wake Forest	3	–	15	.167	6	–	16	.273
Boston College	2	–	11	.154	4	–	16	.200
† 2021 ACC tournament winner Rankings from AP poll

The 2020–21 Louisville Cardinals men's basketball team represented the University of Louisville during the 2020–21 NCAA Division I men's basketball season. The team played its home games on Denny Crum Court at the KFC Yum! Center in downtown Louisville, Kentucky as members of the Atlantic Coast Conference. They were led by third-year head coach Chris Mack.

In a season limited due to the ongoing COVID-19 pandemic, the Cardinals finished the season 13–7, 8–5 to finish in seventh place in ACC play. They lost to Duke in the second round of the ACC tournament. They were listed as an alternate team for the NCAA tournament if a team were unable to participate due to COVID-19 issues. The team declined an invitation to the National Invitation Tournament prior to the NCAA tournament field being announced. When all teams were able to participate in the opening rounds of the NCAA tournament, the Cardinals season ended.

== Previous season ==
The Cardinals finished the 2019–20 season with of 24–7, 15–5 to finish in a tie for second place in ACC play. As the No. 3 seed in the ACC tournament, they were scheduled to play Syracuse before the tournament was canceled due to the COVID-19 pandemic. The NCAA tournament was later also canceled due to the pandemic.

== Offseason ==
=== Departures ===
Name	Number	Pos.	Height	Weight	Year	Hometown	Reason for departure
Lamarr Kimble	0	G	6'0"	185	Graduate Student	Philadelphia, PA	Graduated
Keith Oddo	1	G	6'2"	180	Graduate Student	Roanoke, VA	Graduated
Darius Perry	2	G	6'2"	195	Junior	Marietta, GA	Transferred to UCF
Grant Williams	4	G	5'11"	165	Junior	Crestwood, KY	Walk-on
Steven Enoch	23	C	6'10"	255	(redshirt) Senior	Norwalk, CT	Graduated
Dwayne Sutton	24	G	6'5"	220	(redshirt) Senior	Louisville, KY	Graduated
Ryan McMahon	30	G	6'0"	185	(redshirt) Senior	Sarasota, FL	Graduated
Jordan Nwora	33	F	6'7"	225	Junior	Buffalo, NY	Declared for 2020 NBA draft; selected 45th overall by Milwaukee Bucks

=== Incoming transfers ===
Name	Number	Pos.	Height	Weight	Year	Hometown	Previous School
Carlik Jones	1	G	6'1"	185	Graduate Student	Cincinnati, OH	Radford
Charles Minlend	21	G	6'4"	220	Graduate Student	Concord, NC	San Francisco

=== 2020 recruiting class ===
College recruiting
Name	Hometown	School	Height	Weight	Commit date
D'Andre Davis; SF	Indianapolis, IN	Lawrence Central High School	6 ft 5 in (1.96 m)	185 lb (84 kg)	Oct 20, 2019
D'Andre Davis; SF	Recruit ratings: Scout: Rivals: 247Sports: ESPN:				
JJ Traynor; PF	Bardstown, KY	Bardstown High School	6 ft 8 in (2.03 m)	195 lb (88 kg)	Oct 30, 2019
JJ Traynor; PF	Recruit ratings: Scout: Rivals: 247Sports: ESPN:				
Gabe Wizniter; C	Wallhalla, SC	Hargrave Military Academy	6 ft 11 in (2.11 m)	240 lb (110 kg)	Jun 23, 2020
Gabe Wizniter; C	Recruit ratings: Scout: Rivals: 247Sports: ESPN: (81)				
Overall recruit ranking:
Note: In many cases, Scout, Rivals, 247Sports, On3, and ESPN may conflict in their listings of height and weight.; In these cases, the average was taken. ESPN grades are on a 100-point scale.; Sources: "2020 Louisville Commitments". Rivals.; "Men's Basketball Recruiting". Scout.; "ESPN- Louisville Cardinals Men's Basketball Recruiting". ESPN.; "Scout.com Team Recruiting Rankings". Scout.; "2020 Team Ranking". Rivals.

== Roster ==
2020–21 Louisville Cardinals men's basketball team
Players
Coaches

Pos.	#	Name	Height	Weight	Year	Previous school	Hometown
G	1	Carlik Jones	6 ft 1 in (1.85 m)	185 lb (84 kg)	GS	Aiken; Radford	Cincinnati, OH
F	2	Sam Bearden (W)	6 ft 5 in (1.96 m)	180 lb (82 kg)	Fr	Holy Cross	Louisville, KY
C	3	Hogan Orbaugh (W)	6 ft 8 in (2.03 m)	235 lb (107 kg)	So	Zionsville	Zionsville, IN
G	4	Brad Colbert (W)	6 ft 2 in (1.88 m)	185 lb (84 kg)	Fr	International Sports Academy	Loveland, OH
F/C	5	Malik Williams	6 ft 11 in (2.11 m)	250 lb (113 kg)	Sr	Snider	Fort Wayne, IN
G/F	10	Samuell Williamson	6 ft 7 in (2.01 m)	210 lb (95 kg)	So	Rockwall	Rockwall, TX
F	11	Quinn Slazinski	6 ft 8 in (2.03 m)	215 lb (98 kg)	So	Huntington Prep	Houston, TX
F	12	JJ Traynor	6 ft 8 in (2.03 m)	200 lb (91 kg)	Fr	Bardstown	Bardstown, KY
G	13	David Johnson	6 ft 5 in (1.96 m)	210 lb (95 kg)	So	Trinity	Louisville, KY
G/F	14	Dre Davis	6 ft 5 in (1.96 m)	220 lb (100 kg)	Fr	Lawrence Central	Indianapolis, IN
G	15	Drew Schultz (W)	6 ft 4 in (1.93 m)	205 lb (93 kg)	Fr	Rockwall	Rockwall, TX
G	20	Josh Nickelberry	6 ft 4 in (1.93 m)	205 lb (93 kg)	So	Northwood Temple Academy	Fayetteville, NC
G	21	Charles Minlend	6 ft 4 in (1.93 m)	220 lb (100 kg)	GS	Concord; San Francisco	Concord, NC
F	22	Aidan Igiehon	6 ft 10 in (2.08 m)	245 lb (111 kg)	So	Lawrence Woodmere Academy	Dublin, Ireland
C	23	Gabe Wiznitzer	6 ft 11 in (2.11 m)	240 lb (109 kg)	Fr	Hargrave Military Academy	Walhalla, SC
F	24	Jae'Lyn Withers	6 ft 8 in (2.03 m)	230 lb (104 kg)	RS Fr	Cleveland Heights	Charlotte, NC
G	30	Ashton Myles-Devore (W)	6 ft 0 in (1.83 m)	170 lb (77 kg)	Fr	Woodford County	Versailles, KY

Head coach

- Chris Mack (Xavier)

Assistant coach(es)

- Dino Gaudio (Ohio)
- Luke Murray (Fairfield)
- Mike Pegues (Delaware)

Legend

- (C) Team captain
- (S) Suspended
- (I) Ineligible
- (W) Walk-on
- Injured
- Current redshirt

Roster
Last update: November 20, 2020

== Schedule and results ==
Date time, TV	Rank^{#}	Opponent^{#}	Result	Record	High points	High rebounds	High assists	Site (attendance) city, state
Regular season
November 25, 2020*; 4:00 p.m., ACCN		Evansville	W 79–44	1–0	18 – Jones	8 – Jones	7 – Jones	KFC Yum! Center (2,956); Louisville, KY
November 27, 2020*; 4:00 p.m., ESPN2		Seton Hall	W 71–70	2–0	18 – Jones	11 – Jones	6 – Jones	KFC Yum! Center (2,988); Louisville, KY
November 29, 2020*; 6:00 p.m., ACCRSN		Prairie View A&M	W 86–64	3–0	20 – Withers	9 – Withers	6 – Johnson	KFC Yum! Center (2,934); Louisville, KY
December 1, 2020*; 6:00 p.m., ACCN		Western Kentucky	W 75–54	4–0	21 – Davis	9 – Withers	8 – Johnson	KFC Yum! Center (3,013); Louisville, KY
December 4, 2020*; 2:00 p.m., ACCN		UNC Greensboro	Canceled due to COVID-19 issues					KFC Yum! Center; Louisville, KY
December 16, 2020; 7:00 p.m., ESPN	No. 23	NC State	Postponed due to COVID-19 issues					KFC Yum! Center; Louisville, KY
December 19, 2020*; 12:00 p.m., ESPN2	No. 23	at No. 12 Wisconsin; ACC–Big Ten Challenge	L 48–85	4–1	12 – Johnson	7 – Williamson	4 – Johnson	Kohl Center (0); Madison, WI
December 22, 2020; 7:00 p.m., ACCRSN		at Pittsburgh	W 64–54	5–1 (1–0)	17 – Johnson	12 – Williamson	7 – Jones	Peterson Events Center (0); Pittsburgh, PA
December 26, 2020*; 1:00 p.m., ESPN		Kentucky; Battle for the Bluegrass	W 62–59	6–1	20 – Jones	9 – Withers	4 – Johnson	KFC Yum! Center (3,281); Louisville, KY
January 2, 2021; 12:00 p.m., ACCRSN		at Boston College	W 76–64	7–1 (2–0)	20 – Johnson	9 – Jones	6 – Jones	Conte Forum (0); Chestnut Hill, MA
January 6, 2021; 6:30 p.m., ACCN		No. 19 Virginia Tech	W 73–71	8–1 (3–0)	17 – Tied	12 – Withers	3 – Jones	KFC Yum! Center (2,966); Louisville, KY
January 13, 2021; 8:30 p.m., ACCN	No. 16	at Wake Forest	W 77–65	9–1 (4–0)	23 – Jones	11 – Williamson	9 – Johnson	LJVM Coliseum (71); Winston-Salem, NC
January 16, 2021; 8:00 p.m., ACCN	No. 16	at Miami (FL)	L 72–78	9–2 (4–1)	25 – Jones	11 – Withers	7 – Jones	Watsco Center (0); Coral Gables, FL
January 18, 2021; 7:00 p.m., ESPN		Florida State	L 65–78	9–3 (4–2)	17 – Jones	9 – Withers	3 – Jones	KFC Yum! Center (3,024); Louisville, KY
January 23, 2021; 4:00 p.m., ESPN		Duke	W 70–65	10–3 (5–2)	24 – Jones	8 – Johnson	5 – Tied	KFC Yum! Center (3,219); Louisville, KY
January 27, 2021; 9:00 p.m., RSN	No. 25	at Clemson	L 50–54	10–4 (5–3)	11 – Jones	12 – Withers	3 – Jones	Littlejohn Coliseum (1,876); Clemson, SC
January 30, 2021; 12:00 p.m., ACCRSN	No. 25	Boston College	Postponed due to COVID-19 issues					KFC Yum! Center; Louisville, KY
February 1, 2021; 2:00 p.m., ACCN		Georgia Tech; Makeup from Jan. 9 postponement	W 74–58	11–4 (6–3)	24 – Johnson	18 – Williamson	8 – Jones	KFC Yum! Center (2,868); Louisville, KY
February 3, 2021; 7:00 p.m., ACCN		at Syracuse	Postponed due to COVID-19 issues					Carrier Dome; Syracuse, NY
February 6, 2021; 4:00 p.m., ESPN		at No. 14 Virginia	Postponed due to COVID-19 issues					John Paul Jones Arena; Charlottesville, VA
February 10, 2021; 9:00 p.m., ACCN		Pittsburgh	Postponed due to COVID-19 issues					KFC Yum! Center; Louisville, KY
February 17, 2021; 6:30 p.m., ACCN		Syracuse	Postponed due to COVID-19 issues					KFC Yum! Center; Louisville, KY
February 20, 2021; 6:00 p.m., ESPN		at North Carolina	L 54–99	11–5 (6–4)	13 – Jones	10 – Williamson	4 – Johnson	Dean Smith Center (0); Chapel Hill, NC
February 23, 2021; 7:00 p.m., ACCN		Notre Dame	W 69–57	12–5 (7–4)	18 – Jones	13 – Withers	4 – Jones	KFC Yum! Center (2,948); Louisville, KY
February 27, 2021; 6:00 p.m., ESPN		at Duke	W 80–73 ^{OT}	13–5 (8–4)	25 – Jones	12 – Williamson	4 – Jones	Cameron Indoor Stadium (0); Durham, NC
March 3, 2021; 7:00 p.m., ESPN2		at No. 22 Virginia Tech	Canceled due to COVID-19 issues					Cassell Coliseum; Blacksburg, VA
March 6, 2021; 4:00 p.m., ESPN2		No. 21 Virginia	L 58–68	13–6 (8–5)	14 – Johnson	10 – Williamson	6 – Jones	KFC Yum! Center (4,812); Louisville, KY
ACC tournament
March 10, 2021; 6:30 p.m., ACCN	(7)	vs. (10) Duke; Second round	L 56–70	13–7	14 – Johnson	11 – Johnson	3 – Jones	Greensboro Coliseum (2,820); Greensboro, NC
*Non-conference game. ^{#}Rankings from AP Poll. (#) Tournament seedings in parentheses. All times are in Eastern Time.

== Rankings ==
Ranking movements Legend: ██ Increase in ranking ██ Decrease in ranking — = Not ranked RV = Received votes
	Week																	
Poll	Pre	1	2	3	4	5	6	7	8	9	10	11	12	13	14	15	16	Final
AP	RV	RV	25	23	RV	RV	RV	16	RV	25	RV	RV	RV	—	RV	—	—	Not released
Coaches	RV	RV	24	22	RV	RV	25	18	RV	23	RV	RV	RV	—	RV	—	—	—

*AP does not release post-NCAA Tournament rankings
