= 2020–21 Pittsburgh Panthers men's basketball team =

American college basketball season

2020–21 Pittsburgh Panthers men's basketball
- Conference: Atlantic Coast Conference
- Record: 10–12 (6–10 ACC)
- Head coach: Jeff Capel (3rd season)
- Assistant coaches: Tim O'Toole (3rd season); Milan Brown (3rd season); Jason Capel (3rd season)
- Home arena: Petersen Events Center (Capacity: 12,508)

2020–21 ACC men's basketball standings
	Conf.				Overall
Team	W		L	PCT	W		L	PCT
No. 15 Virginia	13	–	4	.765	18	–	7	.720
No. 14 Florida State	11	–	4	.733	18	–	7	.720
No. 25 Virginia Tech	9	–	4	.692	15	–	7	.682
Georgia Tech †	11	–	6	.647	17	–	9	.654
Clemson	10	–	6	.625	16	–	8	.667
North Carolina	10	–	6	.625	18	–	11	.621
Louisville	8	–	5	.615	13	–	7	.650
Syracuse	9	–	7	.563	18	–	10	.643
NC State	9	–	8	.529	14	–	11	.560
Duke	9	–	9	.500	13	–	11	.542
Notre Dame	7	–	11	.389	11	–	15	.423
Pittsburgh	6	–	10	.375	10	–	12	.455
Miami (FL)	4	–	15	.211	10	–	17	.370
Wake Forest	3	–	15	.167	6	–	16	.273
Boston College	2	–	11	.154	4	–	16	.200
† 2021 ACC tournament winner Rankings from AP poll

The 2020–21 Pittsburgh Panthers men's basketball team represented the University of Pittsburgh during the 2020–21 NCAA Division I men's basketball season. The Panthers were led by third-year head coach Jeff Capel and played their home games at the Petersen Events Center in Pittsburgh, Pennsylvania as members of the Atlantic Coast Conference.

The Panthers finished the season 10–12, 6–10 in ACC play, to finish in twelfth place. They lost to Miami in the first round of the ACC tournament. They were not invited to either the NCAA tournament or NIT.

== Previous season ==
The Panthers finished the 2019–20 season 16–17 overall and 6–14 in ACC play, finishing in a tie for thirteenth in the conference. The Panthers defeated Wake Forest in the first round of the ACC tournament before losing to NC State in the second round. The tournament was cancelled before the Quarterfinals due to the COVID-19 pandemic. The NCAA tournament and NIT were also cancelled due to the pandemic.

== Offseason ==
=== Departures ===
Name	Number	Pos.	Height	Weight	Year	Hometown	Reason for departure
Eric Hamilton	0	F	6'9"	230	Graduate Student	Atlanta, GA	Graduated
Trey McGowens	2	G	6'4"	190	Sophomore	Pendleton, SC	Transferred to Nebraska
KJ Marshall	13	G	5'9"	165	Freshman	Reading, PA	Transferred to Garden City Community College
Kene Chukwuka	15	F	6'9"	225	Senior	Stockholm, Sweden	Graduated
Anthony Starzynski	22	G	6'3"	190	Senior	Pittsburgh, PA	Graduated
Samson George	23	F	6'7"	220	Junior	Minna, Nigeria	Transferred to Central Arkansas
Ryan Murphy	24	G	6'2"	185	Junior	Calabasas, CA	Transferred to Tulane

=== Incoming transfers ===
Name	Number	Pos.	Height	Weight	Year	Hometown	Previous school
Nike Sibande	22	G	6'4"	185	Senior	Indianapolis, IN	Miami (OH)

=== 2020 recruiting class ===
College recruiting information
Name	Hometown	School	Height	Weight	Commit date
Noah Collier; SF	Mullica Hill, NJ	Westtown School	6 ft 7 in (2.01 m)	200 lb (91 kg)	Sep 23, 2019
Noah Collier; SF	Recruit ratings: Scout: Rivals: 247Sports: ESPN: (80)				
John Hugley IV; C	Lyndhurst, OH	Brush High School	6 ft 8 in (2.03 m)	240 lb (110 kg)	Oct 18, 2019
John Hugley IV; C	Recruit ratings: Scout: Rivals: 247Sports: ESPN: (81)				
Max Amadasun; C	Bronx, NY	Our Savior Lutheran High School	6 ft 10 in (2.08 m)	230 lb (100 kg)	Oct 15, 2019
Max Amadasun; C	Recruit ratings: Scout: Rivals: 247Sports: ESPN: (78)				
Femi Odukale; G	Brooklyn, NY	Springfield Commonwealth Academy	6 ft 5 in (1.96 m)	190 lb (86 kg)	Apr 16, 2020
Femi Odukale; G	Recruit ratings: Scout: Rivals: 247Sports: ESPN:				
William Jeffress Jr. SF/SG	Erie, PA	McDowell	6 ft 7 in (2.01 m)	205 lb (93 kg)	Apr 28, 2020
William Jeffress Jr. SF/SG	Recruit ratings: Scout: Rivals: 247Sports: ESPN: (81)				
Overall recruit ranking: Scout: 27 Rivals: 22
Note: In many cases, Scout, Rivals, 247Sports, On3, and ESPN may conflict in their listings of height and weight.; In these cases, the average was taken. ESPN grades are on a 100-point scale.; Sources: "Pittsburgh Panthers". ESPN.; "2020 Team Ranking". Rivals.

== Roster ==
2020–21 Pittsburgh Panthers men's basketball team
Players
Coaches

Pos.	#	Name	Height	Weight	Year	Previous school	Hometown
G	0	Ithiel Horton (redshirt)	6 ft 3 in (1.91 m)	200 lb (91 kg)	RS So	Delaware	Vauxhall, NJ
G	1	Xavier Johnson	6 ft 3 in (1.91 m)	200 lb (91 kg)	Jr	Bishop O'Connell HS	Woodbridge, VA
G	2	Femi Odukale	6 ft 5 in (1.96 m)	185 lb (84 kg)	Fr	Bishop Loughlin HS	Brooklyn, NY
F	3	Noah Collier	6 ft 8 in (2.03 m)	210 lb (95 kg)	Fr	Westtown School	Mullica Hill, NJ
G/F	4	Gerald Drumgoole	6 ft 5 in (1.96 m)	200 lb (91 kg)	So	La Lumiere School	Rochester, NY
G	5	Au'Diese Toney	6 ft 6 in (1.98 m)	210 lb (95 kg)	Jr	Trinity Christian Academy	Huntsville, AL
F	11	Justin Champagnie	6 ft 6 in (1.98 m)	200 lb (91 kg)	So	Bishop Loughlin HS	Brooklyn, NY
F	12	Abdoul Karim Coulibaly	6 ft 8 in (2.03 m)	215 lb (98 kg)	So	Scotland Campus	Bamako, Mali
F	13	Aidan Fisch (W)	6 ft 5 in (1.96 m)	200 lb (91 kg)	Jr	Franklin Regional HS	Murrysville, PA
G	14	Curtis Aiken Jr. (W)	6 ft 1 in (1.85 m)	200 lb (91 kg)	RS So	North Allegheny Senior HS	Wexford, PA
F/C	21	Terrell Brown	6 ft 10 in (2.08 m)	235 lb (107 kg)	Sr	Tilton School	Providence, RI
G	22	Nike Sibande	6 ft 4 in (1.93 m)	185 lb (84 kg)	Sr	Crispus Attacuks HS; Miami (OH)	Indianapolis, IN
F	23	John Hugley (S)	6 ft 9 in (2.06 m)	240 lb (109 kg)	Fr	Brush HS	Cleveland, OH
G/F	24	William Jeffress	6 ft 7 in (2.01 m)	205 lb (93 kg)	Fr	McDowell HS	Erie, PA
G	31	Onyebuchi Ezeakudo (W)	6 ft 0 in (1.83 m)	180 lb (82 kg)	Jr	Homestead HS	Fort Wayne, IN
C	35	Max Amadasun	6 ft 10 in (2.08 m)	230 lb (104 kg)	Fr	Our Saviour Lutheran	Dublin, Ireland
G	42	Chayce Smith	6 ft 3 in (1.91 m)	185 lb (84 kg)	Jr	The Kiski School	Mount Laurel, NJ

Head coach

- Jeff Capel (Duke)

Assistant coach(es)

- Tim O'Toole (Fairfield)
- Milan Brown (Howard)
- Jason Capel (North Carolina)

Legend

- (C) Team captain
- (S) Suspended
- (I) Ineligible
- (W) Walk-on
- Injured
- Current redshirt

Roster
Last update: January 15, 2020

== Schedule and results ==
Date time, TV	Rank^{#}	Opponent^{#}	Result	Record	High points	High rebounds	High assists	Site (attendance) city, state
Non-conference regular season
November 25, 2020*; 7:00 p.m., ACCRSN		St. Francis	L 70–80	0–1	20 – Toney	8 – Hugley	10 – Johnson	Petersen Events Center (500); Pittsburgh, PA
November 28, 2020*; 1:00 p.m., ACCNX		Drexel	W 83–74	1–1	27 – Johnson	8 – Champagnie	8 – Johnson	Petersen Events Center (500); Pittsburgh, PA
December 5, 2020*; 7:00 p.m., ACCNX		Northern Illinois	W 89–59	2–1	22 – Champagnie	10 – Champagnie	7 – Johnson	Petersen Events Center (500); Pittsburgh, PA
December 9, 2020*; 9:15 p.m., ESPN		at Northwestern; ACC–Big Ten Challenge	W 71–70	3–1	21 – Johnson	20 – Champagnie	4 – Johnson	Welsh–Ryan Arena (0); Evanston, IL
December 12, 2020*; 4:00 p.m., ACCRSN		Gardner–Webb	W 67–50	4–1	24 – Champagnie	21 – Champagnie	5 – Champagnie	Petersen Events Center (0); Pittsburgh, PA
ACC regular season
December 16, 2020; 6:00 p.m., ACCN		at Miami (FL)	W 70–55	5–1 (1–0)	18 – Horton	9 – Champagnie	3 – Tied	Watsco Center (0); Coral Gables, FL
December 22, 2020; 7:00 p.m., ACCRSN		Louisville	L 54–64	5–2 (1–1)	16 – Odukale	7 – Hugley	2 – Sibande	Petersen Events Center (0); Pittsburgh, PA
December 29, 2020; 8:00 p.m., ACCN		at No. 20 Duke	Postponed					Cameron Indoor Stadium; Durham, NC
January 6, 2021; 4:30 p.m., ACCN		at Syracuse	W 63–60	6–2 (2–1)	14 – Horton	14 – Toney	7 – Johnson	Carrier Dome (0); Syracuse, NY
January 16, 2021; 12:00 p.m., ACCRSN		Syracuse	W 96–76	7–2 (3–1)	24 – Champagnie	16 – Champagnie	7 – Johnson	Petersen Events Center (500); Pittsburgh, PA
January 19, 2021; 9:00 p.m., ESPN		Duke	W 79-73	8–2 (4–1)	31 – Champagnie	14 – Champagnie	11 – Johnson	Petersen Events Center (500); Pittsburgh, PA
January 23, 2021; 6:00 p.m., ACCN		at Wake Forest	L 75–76	8–3 (4–2)	17 – Champagnie	8 – Champagnie	8 – Johnson	LJVM Coliseum (79); Winston-Salem, NC
January 26, 2021; 7:00 p.m., ACCN		North Carolina	L 65–75	8–4 (4–3)	23 – Champagnie	10 – Champagnie	7 – Johnson	Petersen Events Center (500); Pittsburgh, PA
January 30, 2021; 8:00 p.m., ACCN		Notre Dame	L 58–84	8–5 (4–4)	19 – Champagnie	11 – Champagnie	3 – Tied	Petersen Events Center (500); Pittsburgh, PA
February 3, 2021; 7:00 p.m., ACCRSN		No. 16 Virginia Tech	W 83–72	9–5 (5–4)	32 – Johnson	13 – Champagnie	7 – Johnson	Petersen Events Center (500); Pittsburgh, PA
February 6, 2021; 4:00 p.m., ESPN		at No. 14 Virginia	L 66–73	9–6 (5–5)	18 – Champagnie	10 – Champagnie	7 – Johnson	John Paul Jones Arena (0); Charlottesville, VA
February 10, 2021; 9:00 p.m., ACCN		at Louisville	Postponed					KFC Yum! Center; Louisville, KY
February 14, 2021; 4:00 p.m., ACCN		at Georgia Tech	L 65–71	9–7 (5–6)	18 – Horton	9 – Toney	4 – Tied	McCamish Pavilion (1,200); Atlanta, GA
February 17, 2021; 4:30 p.m., ACCN		NC State	L 73–74	9–8 (5–7)	18 – Champagnie	10 – Champagnie	5 – Horton	Petersen Events Center (500); Pittsburgh, PA
February 20, 2021; 4:00 p.m., ACCRSN		No. 16 Florida State	L 72–79	9–9 (5–8)	21 – Champagnie	10 – Champagnie	3 – Tied	Petersen Events Center (500); Pittsburgh, PA
February 21, 2021; 6:00 p.m., ACCN		Clemson	Postponed					Petersen Events Center; Pittsburgh, PA
February 28, 2021; 4:00 p.m., ACCN		at NC State	L 62–65	9–10 (5–9)	18 – Odukale	12 – Champagnie	5 – Odukale	PNC Arena (500); Raleigh, NC
March 2, 2021; 6:00 p.m., ACCN		Wake Forest	W 70–57	10–10 (6–9)	23 – Sibande	13 – Champagnie	4 – Sibande	Petersen Events Center (500); Pittsburgh, PA
March 6, 2021; 12:00 p.m., ACCRSN		at Clemson	L 62–77	10–11 (6–10)	13 – Champagnie	5 – Brown	3 – Odukale	Littlejohn Coliseum (1,876); Clemson, SC
ACC tournament
March 9, 2021; 2:00 p.m., ACCN	(12)	vs. (13) Miami; First round	L 73–79	10–12	28 – Odukale	10 – Champagnie	3 – Tied	Greensboro Coliseum (2,820); Greensboro, NC
*Non-conference game. ^{#}Rankings from AP Poll. (#) Tournament seedings in parentheses. All times are in Eastern Time.

== Rankings ==
Ranking movements Legend: — = Not ranked
	Week																	
Poll	Pre	1	2	3	4	5	6	7	8	9	10	11	12	13	14	15	16	Final
AP	—	—	—	—	—	—	—	—	—	—	—	—	—	—	—	—	—	Not released
Coaches	—	—	—	—	—	—	—	—	—	—	—	—	—	—	—	—	—	—

*AP does not release post-NCAA tournament rankings
^Coaches did not release a Week 2 poll.
