= 2020–21 Atlantic Coast Conference men's basketball season =

- League: NCAA Division I
- Sport: Basketball
- Duration: December 12, 2020 – March 6, 2021
- Teams: 15
- TV partner(s): ACC Network, ESPN, Regional Sports Networks

NBA Draft
- Top draft pick: Scottie Barnes, Florida State
- Picked by: Toronto Raptors, 4th overall

2020–21 NCAA Division I men's basketball season
- First place: Virginia
- Runners-up: Florida State
- Season MVP: Moses Wright – Georgia Tech

ACC tournament
- Champions: Georgia Tech
- Finals MVP: Michael Devoe – Georgia Tech

Atlantic Coast Conference men's basketball seasons
- ← 2019–20 2021–22 →

2020–21 ACC men's basketball standings
	Conf.				Overall
Team	W		L	PCT	W		L	PCT
No. 15 Virginia	13	–	4	.765	18	–	7	.720
No. 14 Florida State	11	–	4	.733	18	–	7	.720
No. 25 Virginia Tech	9	–	4	.692	15	–	7	.682
Georgia Tech †	11	–	6	.647	17	–	9	.654
Clemson	10	–	6	.625	16	–	8	.667
North Carolina	10	–	6	.625	18	–	11	.621
Louisville	8	–	5	.615	13	–	7	.650
Syracuse	9	–	7	.563	18	–	10	.643
NC State	9	–	8	.529	14	–	11	.560
Duke	9	–	9	.500	13	–	11	.542
Notre Dame	7	–	11	.389	11	–	15	.423
Pittsburgh	6	–	10	.375	10	–	12	.455
Miami (FL)	4	–	15	.211	10	–	17	.370
Wake Forest	3	–	15	.167	6	–	16	.273
Boston College	2	–	11	.154	4	–	16	.200
† 2021 ACC tournament winner Rankings from AP poll

The 2020–21 Atlantic Coast Conference men's basketball season began with practices in October 2020, followed by the start of the 2020–21 NCAA Division I men's basketball season in November. Conference play started in December 2020 and concluded in March with the 2021 ACC men's basketball tournament at Greensboro Coliseum in Greensboro, North Carolina. The season marked the 67th season of Atlantic Coast Conference basketball.

The Virginia Cavaliers won the regular season title with a conference record of 13–4. Georgia Tech won the ACC tournament over Florida State.

== Head coaches ==
=== Coaching changes ===
- Wake Forest fired Danny Manning after six seasons, where he posted a 78–111 record. On April 30, 2020, the Demon Deacons hired Steve Forbes as his replacement.
- Boston College fired Jim Christian in the middle of the season, after leading the team to a 3–13 record. Christian's overall record with Boston College was 78–132 and 26–94 in ACC play. Scott Spinelli served as interim coach until the end of the season. After the season Earl Grant was hired as the new head coach.

=== Coaches ===
Team	Head coach	Previous job	Years at school	Record at school	ACC record	ACC titles	NCAA tournaments	NCAA Final Fours	NCAA Championships
Boston College	Jim Christian	Ohio	7	75–119	25–85	0	0	0	0
Clemson	Brad Brownell	Wright State	11	185–142	85–93	0	6	0	0
Duke	Mike Krzyzewski	Army	41	1,084–291	441–180	16	35	12	5
Florida State	Leonard Hamilton	Washington Wizards	19	382–221	164-142	1	10	0	0
Georgia Tech	Josh Pastner	Memphis	5	65–67	31–43	0	0	0	0
Louisville	Chris Mack	Xavier	3	44–21	25–13	0	1	0	0
Miami	Jim Larrañaga	George Mason	10	190–113	87–75	1	4	1	0
NC State	Kevin Keatts	UNC Wilmington	4	65–36	30–26	0	1	0	0
North Carolina	Roy Williams	Kansas	18	467–152	202–88	3	15	8	3
Notre Dame	Mike Brey	Delaware	21	437–233	200–148	1	12	0	0
Pittsburgh	Jeff Capel	Duke (Assistant)	3	30–36	9–29	0	0	0	0
Syracuse	Jim Boeheim	Syracuse (Assistant)	44	964–399	404–247	0	31	4	1
Virginia	Tony Bennett	Washington State	12	277–96	136–58	2	7	1	1
Virginia Tech	Mike Young	Wofford	2	16–16	7–13	0	0	0	0
Wake Forest	Steve Forbes	East Tennessee State	1	0–0	0–0	0	0	0	0

Notes:

- Year at school includes 2020–21 season.
- Overall and ACC records are from the time at current school and are through the end of the 2019–20 season.
- NCAA tournament appearances are from the time at current school only.
- NCAA Final Fours and championship include time at other schools

== Preseason ==
=== Preseason watchlists ===
Below is a table of notable preseason watch lists.

Wooden	Naismith	Cousy	West	Erving	Malone	Abdul-Jabbar
Scottie Barnes – Florida State; Garrison Brooks – North Carolina; Kihei Clark – Virginia; Sam Hauser – Virginia; Matthew Hurt – Duke; David Johnson – Louisville; Jalen Johnson – Duke	Matthew Hurt – Duke; Jalen Johnson – Duke; Wendell Moore Jr. – Duke; Scottie Barnes – Florida State; David Johnson – Louisville; Garrison Brooks – North Carolina; Caleb Love – North Carolina; Sam Hauser – Virginia	Scottie Barnes – Florida State; Kihei Clark – Virginia	D. J. Steward – Duke	Jalen Johnson – Duke; Wendell Moore Jr. – Duke; Sam Hauser – Virginia	Aamir Simms – Clemson; Matthew Hurt – Duke; Garrison Brooks – North Carolina	Armando Bacot – North Carolina; Walker Kessler – North Carolina; Jay Huff – Virginia; Mark Williams – Duke

=== Preseason polls ===
	AP	Athlon; Sports	Blue Ribbon; Yearbook	CBS Sports	Coaches	ESPN	KenPom	Sports; Illustrated
Boston College				103			106	
Clemson				58			40	
Duke	9	12	9	12	8	10	3	15
Florida State	21	21	18	30	18	23	19	13
Georgia Tech				60	RV		73	
Louisville	RV			26	RV	RV	14	
Miami				48			41	
North Carolina	16	15	17	28	16	15	23	10
NC State				59			55	
Notre Dame				90			100	
Pittsburgh				82			83	
Syracuse				53	RV		29	
Virginia	4	4	4	5	4	4	16	5
Virginia Tech				65			30	
Wake Forest				121			130	

=== ACC preseason media poll ===
The preseason media poll and preseason All-ACC teams were announced at a virtual tipoff event that was held on November 11 and November 12. 155 media members voted on the preseason poll and preseason All-ACC teams.

==== Preseason poll ====
First-place votes shown in parentheses.

1. Virginia (97) – 2214
2. Duke (34) – 2146
3. Florida State (15) – 1973
4. North Carolina (7) – 1933
5. Louisville (2) – 1693
6. Syracuse – 1234
7. Miami – 1223
8. NC State – 1149
9. Georgia Tech – 1147
10. Clemson – 1057
11. Virginia Tech – 794
12. Notre Dame – 769
13. Pitt – 635
14. Boston College – 404
15. Wake Forest – 229

==== Preseason All-ACC teams ====
2020 ACC Men's Basketball Preseason All-ACC Teams
First Team	Second Team
Garrison Brooks – North Carolina; Sam Hauser – Virginia; Scottie Barnes – Florida State; Jalen Johnson – Duke; Aamir Simms – Clemson; Chris Lykes – Miami	David Johnson – Louisville; Jose Alvarado – Georgia Tech; M. J. Walker – Florida State; Kihei Clark – Virginia; Wendell Moore Jr. – Duke

==== ACC preseason player of the year ====
- Garrison Brooks – North Carolina (102)
- Sam Hauser – Virginia (24)
- M. J. Walker – Florida State (10)
- Wendell Moore Jr. – Duke (7)
- Aamir Simms – Clemson (5)
- Matthew Hurt – Duke (3)
- Chris Lykes – Miami (3)
- Kihei Clark – Virginia (1)

==== ACC preseason rookie of the year ====
- Scottie Barnes – Florida State (64)
- Jalen Johnson – Duke (60)
- Caleb Love – North Carolina (9)
- Day'Ron Sharpe – North Carolina (6)
- D. J. Steward – Duke (4)
- Reece Beekman – Virginia (3)
- Jeremy Roach – Duke (3)
- RJ Davis – North Carolina (3)
- Mark Williams – Duke (2)
- Cam Hayes – NC State (1)

== Regular season ==
=== Rankings ===
Legend
Increase in ranking
Decrease in ranking
Not ranked previous week
First Place votes shown in ()

		Pre	Wk 2	Wk 3	Wk 4	Wk 5	Wk 6	Wk 7	Wk 8	Wk 9	Wk 10	Wk 11	Wk 12	Wk 13	Wk 14	Wk 15	Wk 16	Final
Boston College	AP																	
Boston College	C																	
Clemson	AP		RV	RV	24	RV	RV	19т	12	20	RV		RV	RV	RV	RV	RV	RV
Clemson	C		RV	RV	RV	RV	18	12	22	RV		RV	RV	RV	RV	RV	RV	RV
Duke	AP	9	6	10	21	20	20	21	19	RV								
Duke	C	8	11	23	25	RV	24	23	RV									
Florida State	AP	21	22	20	15	21	18	25	RV	RV	16	20	17	16	11	11	15	14
Florida State	C	18	21	15	21	19	22	RV	25	16	19	19	16	9	11	13	14	10
Georgia Tech	AP											RV						RV
Georgia Tech	C	RV									RV						RV	RV
Louisville	AP	RV	RV	25	23	RV	RV	RV	16	RV	25	RV	RV	RV		RV		
Louisville	C	RV	24	22	RV	RV	25	18	RV	23	RV	RV	RV		RV			
Miami	AP																	
Miami	C																	
North Carolina	AP	16	14	16	22	17	RV					RV	RV	RV	RV	RV		
North Carolina	C	16	14	21	17	RV					RV			RV	RV			
NC State	AP						RV	RV	RV									
NC State	C		RV			RV	RV											
Notre Dame	AP																	
Notre Dame	C																	
Pittsburgh	AP																	
Pittsburgh	C																	
Syracuse	AP				RV			RV										
Syracuse	C	RV																25
Virginia	AP	4	15	18	17	16	23	22	18	13	8	14	9	7	15	21	16	15
Virginia	C	4	18	16	15	24т	21	22	12	8	15	9	8	14	20	15	15	24
Virginia Tech	AP		16	15	RV	24	24	19т	20	16	20	16	18	18	16	22	22	25
Virginia Tech	C		15	RV	RV	RV	20	20	14	19	16	17т	17	15	19	21	24	RV
Wake Forest	AP																	
Wake Forest	C																	

=== Conference matrix ===
This table summarizes the head-to-head results between teams in conference play. Each team will play 20 conference games, and at least 1 against each opponent. The full conference schedule was announced on November 10, 2020.

	Boston College	Clemson	Duke	Florida State	Georgia Tech	Louisville	Miami	North Carolina	NC State	Notre Dame	Pittsburgh	Syracuse	Virginia	Virginia Tech	Wake Forest
vs. Boston College	–	0–0	1–0	1–0	0–0	1–0	1–1	0–0	2–0	1–1	0–0	2–0	1–0	0–0	1–0
vs. Clemson	0–0	–	1–0	1–1	1–1	0–1	0–2	0–1	0–1	0–0	0–1	1–1	1–0	1–0	0–1
vs. Duke	0–1	0–1	–	0–0	1–1	2–0	1–0	2–0	0–1	1–1	1–0	0–1	0–1	1–0	0–2
vs. Florida State	0–1	1–1	0–0	–	1–1	0–1	0–2	1–1	0–1	1–0	0–1	0–0	0–1	0–0	0–1
vs. Georgia Tech	0–0	1–1	1–1	1–1	–	1–0	0–1	0–1	0–0	0–1	0–1	0–1	2–0	0–1	0–2
vs. Louisville	0–1	1–0	0–2	1–0	0–1	–	1–0	1–0	0–0	0–1	0–1	0–0	1–0	0–1	0–1
vs. Miami	1–1	2–0	0–1	2–0	1–0	0–1	–	1–0	0–1	2–0	1–0	1–0	1–0	2–0	1–0
vs. North Carolina	0–0	1–0	0–2	1–1	1–0	0–1	0–1	–	1–1	0–1	0–1	1–1	1–0	0–0	0–1
vs. NC State	0–2	1–0	1–0	1–0	0–0	0–0	1–0	1–1	–	0–1	0–2	2–0	1–1	0–0	0–2
vs. Notre Dame	1–1	0–0	1–1	0–1	1–0	1–0	0–2	1–0	1–0	–	0–1	1–0	2–0	2–0	0–1
vs. Pittsburgh	0–0	1–0	0–1	1–0	1–0	1–0	0–1	1–0	2–0	1–0	–	0–2	1–0	0–1	1–1
vs. Syracuse	0–2	1–1	1–0	0–0	1–0	0–0	0–1	1–1	0–2	0–1	2–0	–	1–0	0–1	0–0
vs. Virginia	0–1	0–1	1–0	1–0	0–2	0–1	0–1	0–1	1–1	0–2	0–1	0–1	–	1–0	0–1
vs. Virginia Tech	0–0	0–1	0–1	0–0	1–0	1–0	0–2	0–0	0–0	0–2	1–0	1–0	0–1	–	0–2
vs. Wake Forest	0–1	1–0	2–0	1–0	2–0	1–0	0–1	1–0	2–0	1–0	1–1	0–0	1–0	2–0	–
Total	2–11	10–6	9–9	11–4	11–6	8–5	4–15	10–6	9–8	7–11	6–10	9–7	13–4	9–4	3–15

=== Player of the week ===
Throughout the conference regular season, the Atlantic Coast Conference offices named one or two Players of the week and one or two Freshmen of the week.

Week	Player of the week	Freshman of the week	Reference
Week 1 – Nov. 30	Keve Aluma – Virginia Tech	Jalen Johnson – Duke	
Week 2 – Dec. 7	Moses Wright – Georgia Tech	Dre Davis – Louisville	
Week 3 – Dec. 14	Justin Champagnie – Pittsburgh	Scottie Barnes – Florida State	
Week 4 – Dec. 21	Quincy Guerrier – Syracuse	D. J. Steward – Duke	
Week 5 – Dec. 28	David Johnson – Louisville	Shakeel Moore – NC State	
Week 6 – Jan. 4	Jose Alvarado – Georgia Tech	Day'Ron Sharpe – North Carolina	
Week 7 – Jan. 11	Matthew Hurt – Duke	D. J. Steward (2) – Duke	
Week 8 – Jan. 18	Justin Champagnie (2) – Pittsburgh	R. J. Davis – North Carolina	
Week 8 – Jan. 18	Tyrece Radford – Virginia Tech	R. J. Davis – North Carolina	
Week 9 – Jan. 25	Justin Champagnie (3) – Pittsburgh	Caleb Love – North Carolina	
Week 10 – Feb. 1	Keve Aluma (2) – Virginia Tech	Jalen Johnson (2) – Duke	
Week 11 – Feb. 8	Sam Hauser – Virginia	Caleb Love (2) – North Carolina	
Week 12 – Feb. 15	RaiQuan Gray – Florida State	Scottie Barnes (2) – Florida State	
Week 13 – Feb. 22	Matthew Hurt (2) – Duke	Kerwin Walton – North Carolina	
Week 14 – Mar. 1	Moses Wright (2) – Georgia Tech	Walker Kessler – North Carolina	
Week 14 – Mar. 1	Moses Wright (2) – Georgia Tech	Jae'Lyn Withers – Louisville	
Week 15 – Mar. 8	Moses Wright (3) – Georgia Tech	Dereon Seabron – NC State	

=== Records against other conferences ===
2020–21 records against non-conference foes as of (Feb. 24, 2021). Records shown for regular season only.

Power 7 Conferences	Record
American	1–1
Big East	3–3
Big Ten	6–10
Big 12	0–1
Pac-12	1–0
SEC	7–1
Power 7 Total	18–16
Other NCAA Division I Conferences	Record
American East	2–0
A-10	1–1
ASUN	7–1
Big Sky	0–0
Big South	6–0
Big West	0–0
CAA	6–0
C-USA	1–0
Horizon League	1–0
Ivy League	0–0
MAAC	2–0
MAC	3–0
MEAC	6–0
MVC	1–0
Mountain West	1–0
NEC	2–1
OVC	1–0
Patriot League	0–0
Pacific West	0–0
SoCon	1–1
Southland	0–0
SWAC	1–0
The Summit	0–0
Sun Belt	0–1
WAC	0–0
WCC	0–2
Other Division I Total	42–7
NCAA Division I Total	60–23

== Postseason ==
=== ACC tournament ===
The 2021 Atlantic Coast Conference basketball tournament was originally scheduled to be hosted at the Capital One Arena in Washington, D.C. However, due to the ongoing COVID-19 pandemic, the tournament was moved to the Greensboro Coliseum in Greensboro, North Carolina, on November 24, 2020. The Capital One Arena will host the tournament in 2024.

First round
12	Pittsburgh	73
13	Miami	79
10	Duke	86
15	Boston College	51
11	Notre Dame	80
14	Wake Forest	77

Second round
8	Syracuse	89
9	NC State	68
5	Clemson	64
13	Miami	67
7	Louisville	56
10	Duke	70
6	North Carolina	101
11	Notre Dame	59

Quarterfinals
1	Virginia	72
8	Syracuse	69
4	Georgia Tech	70
13	Miami	66
2	Florida State	w/o
10	Duke
3	Virginia Tech	73
6	North Carolina	81

Semifinals
1	Virginia
4	Georgia Tech	w/o
2	Florida State	69
6	North Carolina	66

Championship
4	Georgia Tech	80
2	Florida State	75

=== NCAA tournament ===
Seed	Region	School	1st round	2nd round	Sweet 16	Elite Eight	Final Four	Championship
4	East	Florida State	W 64–54 vs. #13 UNC Greensboro – (Indianapolis, IN)	W 71–53 vs. #5 Colorado – (Indianapolis, IN)	L 58–76 vs. #1 Michigan – (Indianapolis, IN)			
4	West	Virginia	L 58–62 vs. #13 Ohio – (Bloomington, IN)					
7	Midwest	Clemson	L 56–60 vs. #10 Rutgers – (Indianapolis, IN)					
8	South	North Carolina	L 62–85 vs. #9 Wisconsin – (West Lafayette, IN)					
9	Midwest	Georgia Tech	L 60–71 vs. #8 Loyola–Chicago – (Indianapolis, IN)					
10	South	Virginia Tech	L 70–75 (OT) vs. #7 Florida – (Indianapolis, IN)					
11	Midwest	Syracuse	W 78–62 vs. #6 San Diego State – (Indianapolis, IN)	W 75–72 vs. #3 West Virginia – (Indianapolis, IN)	L 46–62 vs. #2 Houston – (Indianapolis, IN)			
		W–L (%):	2–5 (.286)	2–0 (1.000)	0–2 (.000)	0–0 (–)	0–0 (–)	0–0 (–) Total: 4–7 (.364)

=== National Invitation Tournament ===
Seed	Bracket	School	1st round	Quarterfinals	Semifinals	Championship
3	Colorado State	NC State	W 75–61 vs. #2 Davidson – (Denton, TX)	L 61–65 vs. #1 Colorado State – (Frisco, TX)		
		W–L (%):	1–0 (1.000)	0–1 (.000)	0–0 (–)	0–0 (–) Total: 1–1 (.500)

== Honors and awards ==
=== All-Americans ===
Consensus All-Americans
First Team	Second Team
None	None

To earn "consensus" status, a player must win honors based on a point system computed from the four different all-America teams. The point system consists of three points for first team, two points for second team and one point for third team. No honorable mention or fourth team or lower are used in the computation. The top five totals plus ties are first team and the next five plus ties are second team.

Associated Press	NABC	Sporting News	USBWA
First Team
None	None	None	None
Second Team
None	None	None	None
Third Team
None	None	None	None

=== ACC Awards ===
2021 ACC Men's Basketball Individual Awards
Award	Recipient(s)
Player of the Year	Moses Wright – Georgia Tech
Coach of the Year	Mike Young – Virginia Tech
Defensive Player of the Year	Jose Alvarado – Georgia Tech
Freshman of the Year	Scottie Barnes – Florida State
Most Improved Player of the Year	Matthew Hurt – Duke
Sixth Man Award	Scottie Barnes – Florida State

2021 ACC Men's Basketball All-Conference Teams
First Team	Second Team	Third Team	Honorable Mention
Moses Wright – Georgia Tech; Justin Champagnie – Pittsburgh; Carlik Jones – Louisville; Matthew Hurt – Duke; Sam Hauser – Virginia	Keve Aluma – Virginia Tech; Jose Alvarado – Georgia Tech; Jay Huff – Virginia; M. J. Walker – Florida State; Aamir Simms – Clemson	RaiQuan Gray – Florida State; Isaiah Wong – Miami; Quincy Guerrier – Syracuse; Prentiss Hubb – Notre Dame; Armando Bacot – North Carolina; Scottie Barnes – Florida State	Michael Devoe – Georgia Tech; Kihei Clark – Virginia; Alan Griffin – Syracuse; David Johnson – Louisville; Nate Laszewski – Notre Dame; Jericole Hellems – NC State; Tyrece Radford – Virginia Tech

2020 ACC Men's Basketball All-Freshman Team
Player	Team
Scottie Barnes	Florida State
DJ Steward	Duke
Day'Ron Sharpe	North Carolina
Jae'Lyn Withers	Louisville
Caleb Love	North Carolina

== NBA draft ==
PG	Point guard	SG	Shooting guard	SF	Small forward	PF	Power forward	C	Center

The ACC had seven players selected in the 2021 NBA draft. Over the last eight years (2014–2021) the ACC leads all conferences with forty nine first-round selections.

Player	Team	Round	Pick #	Position	School
Scottie Barnes	Toronto Raptors	1	4	PF	Florida State
Trey Murphy III	Memphis Grizzlies	1	17	SF	Virginia
Jalen Johnson	Atlanta Hawks	1	20	SF	Duke
Day'Ron Sharpe	Phoenix Suns	1	29	C	North Carolina
David Johnson	Toronto Raptors	2	47	PG	Louisville
Balša Koprivica	Charlotte Hornets	2	57	C	Florida State
RaiQuan Gray	Brooklyn Nets	2	59	PF	Florida State

== Attendance ==
Due to the COVID-19 pandemic, attendance was limited at all stadiums for the season. Depending on state regulations, some universities did not allow any fans while some universities operated under reduced total capacity.

Team	Arena	Capacity	Game 1	Game 2	Game 3	Game 4	Game 5	Game 6	Game 7	Total	Average	% of Capacity
Team	Arena	Capacity	Game 8	Game 9	Game 10	Game 11	Game 12	Game 13	Game 14	Total	Average	% of Capacity
Boston College	Conte Forum	8,606	No attendance due to COVID-19							No attendance due to COVID-19		
Clemson	Littlejohn Coliseum	9,000	1,345	1,876	1,508	1,876	1,876	1,876	1,876	21,613	1,801	20.01%
Clemson	Littlejohn Coliseum	9,000	1,876	1,876	1,876	1,876	1,876			21,613	1,801	20.01%
Duke	Cameron Indoor Stadium	9,314	No attendance due to COVID-19							No attendance due to COVID-19		
Florida State	Donald L. Tucker Center	12,100	2,720	2,956	2,761	2,664	2,576	2,078	2,837	36,067	2,774	22.93%
Florida State	Donald L. Tucker Center	12,100	2,850	2,950	2,825	2,950	2,950	2,950		36,067	2,774	22.93%
Georgia Tech	McCamish Pavilion	8,600	1,200	1,200	1,200	1,200	1,200	1,200	1,200	15,600	1,200	13.95%
Georgia Tech	McCamish Pavilion	8,600	1,200	1,200	1,200	1,200	1,200	1,200		15,600	1,200	13.95%
Louisville	KFC Yum! Center	22,090	2,956	2,988	2,934	3,013	3,281	2,966	3,024	35,009	3,183	14.41%
Louisville	KFC Yum! Center	22,090	3,219	2,868	2,948	4,812				35,009	3,183	14.41%
Miami	Watsco Center	7,972	No attendance due to COVID-19							No attendance due to COVID-19		
North Carolina	Dean Smith Center	21,750	No attendance due to COVID-19							3,263	3,263	15%
North Carolina	Dean Smith Center	21,750	3,263							3,263	3,263	15%
NC State	PNC Arena	19,722	25	25	0	0	0	0	25	650	59	0.3%
NC State	PNC Arena	19,722	25	25	25	500				650	59	0.3%
Notre Dame	Edmund P. Joyce Center	9,149	84	156	89	82	86	78	103	2,058	187	2.04%
Notre Dame	Edmund P. Joyce Center	9,149	123	114	497	646				2,058	187	2.04%
Pittsburgh	Petersen Events Center	12,508	500	500	500	0	0	500	500	5,500	423	3.38%
Pittsburgh	Petersen Events Center	12,508	500	500	500	500	500	500		5,500	423	3.38%
Syracuse	Carrier Dome	35,446	No attendance due to COVID-19							No attendance due to COVID-19		
Virginia	John Paul Jones Arena	14,593	250	250	250	250	250	250	250	2,250	205	1.4%
Virginia	John Paul Jones Arena	14,593	250	250	0	0				2,250	205	1.4%
Virginia Tech	Cassell Coliseum	10,052	250	250	250	250	250	250	250	3,000	250	2.5%
Virginia Tech	Cassell Coliseum	10,052	250	250	250	250	250			3,000	250	2.5%
Wake Forest	LJVM Coliseum	14,665	0	0	77	71	89	79	82	1,915	174	1.19%
Wake Forest	LJVM Coliseum	14,665	102	116	70	1,229				1,915	174	1.19%
