= 2020–21 Syracuse Orange men's basketball team =

American college basketball season

2020–21 Syracuse Orange men's basketball

NCAA tournament, Sweet Sixteen
- Conference: Atlantic Coast Conference

Ranking
- Coaches: No. 25
- Record: 18–10 (9–7 ACC)
- Head coach: Jim Boeheim (45th season)
- Assistant coaches: Adrian Autry; Gerry McNamara; Allen Griffin
- Offensive scheme: Ball-Screen Motion
- Base defense: 2-3 Zone
- Home arena: Carrier Dome

2020–21 ACC men's basketball standings
	Conf.				Overall
Team	W		L	PCT	W		L	PCT
No. 15 Virginia	13	–	4	.765	18	–	7	.720
No. 14 Florida State	11	–	4	.733	18	–	7	.720
No. 25 Virginia Tech	9	–	4	.692	15	–	7	.682
Georgia Tech †	11	–	6	.647	17	–	9	.654
Clemson	10	–	6	.625	16	–	8	.667
North Carolina	10	–	6	.625	18	–	11	.621
Louisville	8	–	5	.615	13	–	7	.650
Syracuse	9	–	7	.563	18	–	10	.643
NC State	9	–	8	.529	14	–	11	.560
Duke	9	–	9	.500	13	–	11	.542
Notre Dame	7	–	11	.389	11	–	15	.423
Pittsburgh	6	–	10	.375	10	–	12	.455
Miami (FL)	4	–	15	.211	10	–	17	.370
Wake Forest	3	–	15	.167	6	–	16	.273
Boston College	2	–	11	.154	4	–	16	.200
† 2021 ACC tournament winner Rankings from AP poll

The 2020–21 Syracuse Orange men's basketball team represented Syracuse University during the 2020–21 NCAA Division I men's basketball season. The Orange were led by 45th-year head coach Jim Boeheim and played their home games at the Carrier Dome in Syracuse, New York as eighth-year members of the Atlantic Coast Conference.

The Orange finished the season 18–10, 9–7 in ACC play, to finish in eight place. In the ACC tournament, they defeated NC State in the second round before losing to Virginia in the Quarterfinals. They received an at-large bid to the NCAA tournament as an eleven seed in the Midwest Region. In the tournament, they defeated six seed San Diego State in the first round and three seed West Virginia in the second round, before losing to two seed Houston in the Sweet Sixteen.

== Previous season ==
The Orange finished the 2019–20 season 18–14, 10–10 in ACC play to finish in a tie for sixth place. They defeated North Carolina in the second round of the 2020 ACC tournament and was scheduled to play Louisville in the quarterfinals before the tournament was cancelled due to the COVID-19 pandemic. The NCAA tournament and NIT were also cancelled due to the pandemic.

== Offseason ==
=== Departures ===
Name	Number	Pos.	Height	Weight	Year	Hometown	Reason for departure
Brycen Goodine	0	G	6'3"	183	Freshman	New Bedford, MA	Transferred to Providence
Jalen Carey	5	G	6'3"	186	Sophomore	Harlem, NY	Transferred to Rhode Island
Howard Washington	10	G	6'3"	175	Junior	Buffalo, NY	Transferred to South Alabama
Brendan Paul	12	G	6'2"	175	Sophomore	Shaker Heights, OH	Transferred to Fairmont State
Shaun Belbey	24	G	5'10"	165	Graduate Student	Brick, NJ	Graduated
Elijah Hughes	33	F	6'6"	215	(redshirt) Junior	Beacon, NY	Declared for 2020 NBA draft; selected 39th overall by New Orleans Pelicans and then traded to Utah Jazz

=== Incoming transfers ===
Name	Number	Pos.	Height	Weight	Year	Hometown	Previous School
Alan Griffin	0	F	6'5"	190	Junior	Ossining, NY	Illinois

=== 2020 recruiting class ===
College recruiting information
Name	Hometown	School	Height	Weight	Commit date
Kadary Richmond; PG / SG	Brooklyn, NY	Brewster Academy	6 ft 5 in (1.96 m)	175 lb (79 kg)	Oct 28, 2019
Kadary Richmond; PG / SG	Recruit ratings: 247Sports: ESPN: (82)				
Woody Newton; PF	Baltimore, MD	Mt. Zion Prep	6 ft 8 in (2.03 m)	190 lb (86 kg)	May 28, 2019
Woody Newton; PF	Recruit ratings: 247Sports: ESPN: (80)				
Frank Anselem; C	Windsor, CA	Prolific Prep	6 ft 10 in (2.08 m)	200 lb (91 kg)	Jun 3, 2020
Frank Anselem; C	Recruit ratings: 247Sports: ESPN: (79)				
Chaz Owens; SF	Bryn Mawr, PA	Scotland Campus Prep	6 ft 5 in (1.96 m)	200 lb (91 kg)	Sep 3, 2020
Chaz Owens; SF	Recruit ratings: ESPN:				
Overall recruit ranking:
Note: In many cases, Scout, Rivals, 247Sports, On3, and ESPN may conflict in their listings of height and weight.; In these cases, the average was taken. ESPN grades are on a 100-point scale.; Sources: "2020 Syracuse Signees". Rivals.; "2020 Syracuse Signees". Scout.; "2020 Syracuse Signees". ESPN.; "Scout.com Team Recruiting Rankings". Scout.; "2020 Team Ranking". Rivals.

== Roster ==
2020–21 Syracuse Orange men's basketball team
Players
Coaches

Pos.	#	Name	Height	Weight	Year	Previous school	Hometown
F	0	Alan Griffin	6 ft 5 in (1.96 m)	190 lb (86 kg)	Jr	Ossining; Illinois	Ossining, New York
F	1	Quincy Guerrier	6 ft 7 in (2.01 m)	220 lb (100 kg)	So	Thetford Academy	Montreal, Quebec
C	2	John Bol Ajak	6 ft 10 in (2.08 m)	215 lb (98 kg)	RS Fr	Westtown School	Natinga, South Sudan
G	3	Kadary Richmond	6 ft 5 in (1.96 m)	180 lb (82 kg)	Fr	Brewster Academy	Brooklyn, New York
F	4	Woody Newton	6 ft 8 in (2.03 m)	200 lb (91 kg)	Fr	McKinley Tech	District Heights, Maryland
C	5	Frank Anselem	6 ft 10 in (2.08 m)	210 lb (95 kg)	Fr	Westlake	Lagos, Nigeria
G	10	Arthur Cordes	6 ft 3 in (1.91 m)	185 lb (84 kg)	Fr	Sheehan	Wallingford, Connecticut
G	11	Joseph Girard III	6 ft 1 in (1.85 m)	195 lb (88 kg)	So	Glens Falls	Glens Falls, New York
F	9	Pharrell Osei	6 ft 5 in (1.96 m)	200 lb (91 kg)	Fr	Queensmead School	Londen, United Kingdom
G	13	Chris Lavalle (W)	5 ft 11 in (1.8 m)	175 lb (79 kg)	Sr	West Genesee	Syracuse, New York
C	14	Jesse Edwards	6 ft 11 in (2.11 m)	215 lb (98 kg)	So	IMG Academy	Amsterdam, Netherlands
F	20	Robert Braswell	6 ft 7 in (2.01 m)	206 lb (93 kg)	RS So	Blythewood	Jacksonville, Florida
F	21	Marek Doležaj	6 ft 10 in (2.08 m)	201 lb (91 kg)	Sr	MBK Karlovka Bratislava	Bratislava, Slovakia
G	23	Jaylen Bartley	6 ft 2 in (1.88 m)	173 lb (78 kg)	Jr	Pimmit Hills	Atlanta, Georgia
F	32	Nick Giancola (W)	6 ft 5 in (1.96 m)	205 lb (93 kg)	Sr	Lexington Catholic	Lexington, Kentucky
C	34	Bourama Sidibe	6 ft 10 in (2.08 m)	218 lb (99 kg)	Sr	St. Benedict's Prep	Bamako, Mali
G	35	Buddy Boeheim	6 ft 6 in (1.98 m)	195 lb (88 kg)	Jr	Brewster Academy	Syracuse, New York

Head coach

- Jim Boeheim, 45th yr. (Syracuse, 1966)

Assistant coach(es)

- Adrian Autry, 10th yr. (Syracuse, 1994)
- Gerry McNamara, 12th yr. (Syracuse, 2007)
- Allen Griffin, 4th yr. (Syracuse, 2001)

Legend

- (C) Team captain
- (S) Suspended
- (I) Ineligible
- (W) Walk-on
- Injured
- Current redshirt

Roster
Last update: November 24, 2020

== Schedule and results ==
Date time, TV	Rank^{#}	Opponent^{#}	Result	Record	High points	High rebounds	High assists	Site (attendance) city, state
Regular season
November 27, 2020*; 3:00 p.m., ACCN		Bryant	W 85–84	1–0	23 – Boeheim	12 – Tied	9 – Dolezaj	Carrier Dome (0); Syracuse, NY
December 3, 2020*; 8:00 p.m., ACCRSN		Niagara	W 75–45	2–0	23 – Guerrier	13 – Guerrier	6 – Richmond	Carrier Dome (0); Syracuse, NY
December 5, 2020*; 7:00 p.m., ACCRSN		Rider	W 87–52	3–0	23 – Griffin	8 – Newton	6 – Richmond	Carrier Dome (0); Syracuse, NY
December 8, 2020*; 9:30 p.m., ESPN2		at No. 21 Rutgers; ACC–Big Ten Challenge	L 69–79	3–1	20 – Griffin	8 – Griffin	7 – Richmond	Rutgers Athletic Center (0); Piscataway, NJ
December 12, 2020; 1:00 p.m., ESPNU		at Boston College	W 101–63	4–1 (1–0)	22 – Griffin	10 – Griffin	7 – Dolezaj	Conte Forum (0); Chestnut Hill, MA
December 16, 2020*; 3:00 pm, ACCN		Northeastern	W 62–56	5–1	21 – Girard III	16 – Guerrier	3 – Girard III	Carrier Dome (0); Syracuse, NY
December 19, 2020*; 6:00 pm, ACCN		Buffalo	W 107–96 ^{OT}	6–1	27 – Guerrier	11 – Guerrier	5 – Tied	Carrier Dome (0); Syracuse, NY
December 30, 2020; 5:00 p.m., ESPN2		at Wake Forest	Postponed due to COVID-19 issues					LJVM Coliseum; Winston-Salem, NC
January 6, 2021; 7:00 p.m., ESPNU		No. 25 Florida State	Postponed due to COVID-19 issues					Carrier Dome; Syracuse, NY
January 6, 2021; 4:30 p.m., ACCN		Pittsburgh	L 60–63	6–2 (1–1)	15 – Griffin	8 – Griffin	6 – Girard III	Carrier Dome (0); Syracuse, NY
January 9, 2021*; 8:00 p.m., ESPN		Georgetown; Rivalry	W 74–69	7–2	21 – Boeheim	9 – Tied	8 – Girard III	Carrier Dome (0); Syracuse, NY
January 12, 2021; 9:00 p.m., ACCN		at North Carolina	L 75–81	7–3 (1–2)	23 – Guerrier	11 – Guerrier	4 – Boeheim	Dean Smith Center (0); Chapel Hill, NC
January 16, 2021; 12:00 p.m., ACCRSN		at Pittsburgh	L 76–96	7–4 (1–3)	28 – Griffin	12 – Guerrier	5 – Boeheim	Peterson Events Center (500); Pittsburgh, PA
January 19, 2021; 7:00 p.m., ACCN		Miami (FL)	W 83–57	8–4 (2–3)	23 – Tied	8 – Guerrier	8 – Richmond	Carrier Dome (0); Syracuse, NY
January 23, 2021; 12:00 p.m., ACCRSN		No. 16 Virginia Tech	W 78–60	9–4 (3–3)	20 – Guerrier	10 – Griffin	4 – Girard III	Carrier Dome (0); Syracuse, NY
January 25, 2021; 7:00 p.m., ESPN		at No. 8 Virginia	L 58–81	9–5 (3–4)	15 – Guerrier	8 – Griffin	3 – Dolezaj	John Paul Jones Arena (250); Charlottesville, VA
January 31, 2021; 6:00 p.m., ACCN		NC State	W 76–73	10–5 (4–4)	19 – Boeheim	10 – Guerrier	6 – Dolezaj	Carrier Dome (0); Syracuse, NY
February 3, 2021; 7:00 p.m., ACCN		Louisville	Postponed due to COVID-19 issues					Carrier Dome; Syracuse, NY
February 6, 2021; 2:00 p.m., ACCN		at Clemson	L 61–78	10–6 (4–5)	19 – Girard	6 – Guerrier	3 – Richmond	Littlejohn Coliseum (1,876); Clemson, SC
February 9, 2021; 6:30 p.m., ACCN		at NC State	W 77–68	11–6 (5–5)	22 – Griffin	7 – Guerrier	3 – Tied	PNC Arena (25); Raleigh, NC
February 13, 2021; 2:00 p.m., ACCN		Boston College	W 75–67	12–6 (6–5)	16 – Girard III	9 – Guerrier	3 – 3 tied	Carrier Dome (0); Syracuse, NY
February 17, 2021; 6:30 p.m., ACCN		at Louisville	Postponed due to COVID-19 issues					KFC Yum! Center; Louisville, KY
February 20, 2021; 2:00 p.m., ACCN		Notre Dame	W 75–67	13–6 (7–5)	29 – Boeheim	14 – Guerrier	4 – Dolezaj	Carrier Dome (0); Syracuse, NY
February 22, 2021; 7:00 p.m., ESPN		at Duke	L 71–85	13–7 (7–6)	21 – Boeheim	8 – Tied	4 – Boeheim	Cameron Indoor Stadium (0); Durham, NC
February 27, 2021; 12:00 p.m., ACCN		at Georgia Tech	L 77–84	13–8 (7–7)	26 – Griffin	8 – Edwards	6 – Richmond	McCamish Pavilion (1,200); Atlanta, GA
March 1, 2021; 7:00 p.m., ESPN		North Carolina	W 72–70	14–8 (8–7)	26 – Boeheim	8 – Edwards	9 – Richmond	Carrier Dome (0); Syracuse, NY
March 3, 2021; 5:00 p.m., ACCN		Clemson	W 64–54	15–8 (9–7)	22 – Griffin	10 – Griffin	7 – Girard III	Carrier Dome (0); Syracuse, NY
ACC tournament
March 10, 2021; 12:00 p.m., ACCN	(8)	vs. (9) NC State; Second round	W 89–68	16–8	27 – Boeheim	8 – Tied	5 – Tied	Greensboro Coliseum (2,820); Greensboro, NC
March 11, 2021; 12:00 p.m., ESPN2	(8)	vs. (1) No. 16 Virginia; Quarterfinals	L 69–72	16–9	31 – Boeheim	10 – Guerrier	4 – Tied	Greensboro Coliseum (2,820); Greensboro, NC
NCAA tournament
March 19, 2021; 9:40 p.m., CBS	(11 MW)	vs. (6 MW) No. 16 San Diego State; First Round	W 78–62	17–9	30 – Boeheim	6 – Girard III	7 – Girard III	Hinkle Fieldhouse; Indianapolis, IN
March 21, 2021; 5:15 p.m., CBS	(11 MW)	vs. (3 MW) No. 13 West Virginia; Second Round	W 75–72	18–9	25 – Boeheim	7 – Guerrier	7 – Girard III	Bankers Life Fieldhouse; Indianapolis, IN
March 27, 2021; 9:55 p.m., TBS	(11 MW)	vs. (2 MW) No. 6 Houston; Sweet Sixteen	L 46–62	18–10	12 – Tied	6 – Tied	2 – Dolezaj	Hinkle Fieldhouse; Indianapolis, IN
*Non-conference game. ^{#}Rankings from AP Poll. (#) Tournament seedings in parentheses. MW=Midwest. All times are in Eastern Time.

== Rankings ==
Ranking movements Legend: ██ Increase in ranking ██ Decrease in ranking — = Not ranked RV = Received votes
	Week																	
Poll	Pre	1	2	3	4	5	6	7	8	9	10	11	12	13	14	15	16	Final
AP	—	—	—	RV	—	—	RV	—	—	—	—	—	—	—	—	—	—	Not released
Coaches	RV	RV^	—	—	—	—	—	—	—	—	—	—	—	—	—	—	—	25

*AP does not release post-NCAA Tournament rankings
^Coaches did not release a Week 2 poll.
