= 2020–21 NC State Wolfpack men's basketball team =

American college basketball season

2020–21 NC State Wolfpack men's basketball

NIT, Quarterfinals
- Conference: Atlantic Coast Conference
- Record: 14–11 (9–8 ACC)
- Head coach: Kevin Keatts (4th season)
- Assistant coaches: James Johnson; Roy Roberson; Mike Summey
- Home arena: PNC Arena

2020–21 ACC men's basketball standings
	Conf.				Overall
Team	W		L	PCT	W		L	PCT
No. 15 Virginia	13	–	4	.765	18	–	7	.720
No. 14 Florida State	11	–	4	.733	18	–	7	.720
No. 25 Virginia Tech	9	–	4	.692	15	–	7	.682
Georgia Tech †	11	–	6	.647	17	–	9	.654
Clemson	10	–	6	.625	16	–	8	.667
North Carolina	10	–	6	.625	18	–	11	.621
Louisville	8	–	5	.615	13	–	7	.650
Syracuse	9	–	7	.563	18	–	10	.643
NC State	9	–	8	.529	14	–	11	.560
Duke	9	–	9	.500	13	–	11	.542
Notre Dame	7	–	11	.389	11	–	15	.423
Pittsburgh	6	–	10	.375	10	–	12	.455
Miami (FL)	4	–	15	.211	10	–	17	.370
Wake Forest	3	–	15	.167	6	–	16	.273
Boston College	2	–	11	.154	4	–	16	.200
† 2021 ACC tournament winner Rankings from AP poll

The 2020–21 NC State Wolfpack men's basketball team represented North Carolina State University during the 2020–21 NCAA Division I men's basketball season. The Wolfpack were led by fourth-year head coach Kevin Keatts and played their home games at PNC Arena in Raleigh, North Carolina as members of the Atlantic Coast Conference (ACC).

The Wolfpack finished the season 14–11, and 9–8 in ACC play to finish in ninth place. As the ninth seed in the ACC tournament, they lost to Syracuse in the first round. They earned an at-large bid to the NIT. As the third seed in the Colorado State bracket, they defeated Davidson in the first round, before losing to Colorado State in the quarterfinals.

== Previous season ==
The Wolfpack finished the 2019–20 season 20–12, 10–10 in ACC play to finish in a tie for sixth place. The Wolfpack had earned the fifth seed in the 2020 ACC tournament before the tournament was canceled due to the COVID-19 pandemic.

== Roster ==
2020–21 NC State Wolfpack men's basketball team
Players
Coaches

Pos.	#	Name	Height	Weight	Year	Hometown
F	0	D. J. Funderburk	6 ft 10 in (2.08 m)	225 lb (102 kg)	RS Sr	Cleveland, Ohio
G	1	Dereon Seabron	6 ft 7 in (2.01 m)	180 lb (82 kg)	RS Fr	Norfolk, Virginia
G	2	Shakeel Moore	6 ft 1 in (1.85 m)	180 lb (82 kg)	Fr	Greensboro, North Carolina
G	3	Cam Hayes	6 ft 3 in (1.91 m)	175 lb (79 kg)	Fr	Greensboro, North Carolina
F	4	Jericole Hellems	6 ft 7 in (2.01 m)	205 lb (93 kg)	Jr	St. Louis, Missouri
G	5	Thomas Allen	6 ft 1 in (1.85 m)	180 lb (82 kg)	RS Jr	Raleigh, North Carolina
G	10	Braxton Beverly	6 ft 0 in (1.83 m)	185 lb (84 kg)	Sr	Hazard, Kentucky
F	11	Jaylon Gibson	6 ft 9 in (2.06 m)	210 lb (95 kg)	Fr	Zebulon, North Carolina
G	12	Chase Graham (W)	6 ft 1 in (1.85 m)	170 lb (77 kg)	So	Raleigh, North Carolina
F	15	Manny Bates	6 ft 11 in (2.11 m)	230 lb (104 kg)	RS So	Fayetteville, North Carolina
F	21	Ebenezer Dowuona	6 ft 11 in (2.11 m)	235 lb (107 kg)	Fr	Accra, Ghana
G	22	Max Farthing (W)	6 ft 7 in (2.01 m)	210 lb (95 kg)	So	Raleigh, North Carolina
G	24	Devon Daniels	6 ft 5 in (1.96 m)	200 lb (91 kg)	RS Sr	Battle Creek, Michigan
F	30	Nick Farrar	6 ft 6 in (1.98 m)	260 lb (118 kg)	Fr	Apex, North Carolina

Head coach

- Kevin Keatts (Ferrum)

Assistant coach(es)

- James Johnson (Ferrum)
- Roy Roberson (Lynchburg)
- Mike Summey (NC State)

Legend

- (C) Team captain
- (S) Suspended
- (I) Ineligible
- (W) Walk-on
- Injured
- Current redshirt

Roster Source:

== Schedule and results ==
Date time, TV	Rank^{#}	Opponent^{#}	Result	Record	High points	High rebounds	High assists	Site (attendance) city, state
Regular season
November 25, 2020*; 8:00 p.m., ACCN		Charleston Southern; Mako Medical Wolfpack Invitational	W 95–61	1–0	29 – Daniels	10 – Daniels	4 – Tied	Reynolds Coliseum (25); Raleigh, NC
November 27, 2020*; 5:30 p.m., ACCRSN		North Florida; Mako Medical Wolfpack Invitational	W 86–51	2–0	17 – Hellems	8 – Bates	6 – Hayes	Reynolds Coliseum (25); Raleigh, NC
November 30, 2020*; 7:00 p.m., ACCN		William & Mary	Canceled due to COVID-19 issues					Reynolds Coliseum; Raleigh, NC
December 3, 2020*; 4:30 p.m., ESPNU		vs. UMass Lowell; Bubbleville	W 90–59	3–0	18 – Daniels	6 – Bates	6 – Hayes	Mohegan Sun Arena (0); Uncasville, CT
December 5, 2020*; 12:00 p.m., ESPNU		vs. Connecticut; Bubbleville	Canceled due to COVID-19 issues					Mohegan Sun Arena; Uncasville, CT
December 9, 2020*; 7:15 p.m., ESPN2		at Michigan; ACC–Big Ten Challenge	Canceled due to COVID-19 issues					Crisler Center; Ann Arbor, MI
December 12, 2020*; 7:00 p.m., ACCRSN		Florida Atlantic	Canceled due to COVID-19 issues					Reynolds Coliseum; Raleigh, NC
December 16, 2020; 7:00 p.m., ESPN		at No. 23 Louisville	Postponed due to COVID-19 issues					KFC Yum! Center; Louisville, KY
December 17, 2020*; 8:00 p.m., ESPN+		at Saint Louis	L 69–80	3–1	20 – Bates	9 – Hellems	3 – Tied	Chaifetz Arena (0); St. Louis, MO
December 19, 2020*; 4:00 p.m., ACCN		Campbell	W 69–50	4–1	19 – Hellems	7 – Tied	5 – Hellems	PNC Arena (0); Raleigh, NC
December 22, 2020; 7:00 p.m., ACCN		No. 17 North Carolina; Rivalry	W 79–76	5–1 (1–0)	21 – Daniels	7 – Tied	3 – Tied	PNC Arena (0); Raleigh, NC
December 30, 2020; 8:00 p.m., ACCN		Boston College	W 79–76	6–1 (2–0)	21 – Funderburk	6 – Tied	5 – Daniels	PNC Arena (0); Raleigh, NC
January 5, 2021; 7:00 p.m., ACCN		at No. 19 Clemson	L 70–74 ^{OT}	6–2 (2–1)	20 – Funderburk	10 – Tied	3 – Moore	Littlejohn Coliseum (1,867); Clemson, SC
January 9, 2021; 12:00 p.m., ACCRSN		Miami (FL)	L 59–64	6–3 (2–2)	14 – Allen	10 – Bates	3 – Tied	PNC Arena (0); Raleigh, NC
January 13, 2021; 7:00 p.m., ESPN2		at Florida State	L 73–105	6–4 (2–3)	16 – Allen	6 – Hellems	5 – Hayes	Donald L. Tucker Civic Center (2,837); Tallahassee, FL
January 16, 2021; 2:00 p.m., ACCRSN		Georgia Tech	Postponed due to COVID-19 issues					PNC Arena; Raleigh, NC
January 23, 2021; 2:00 p.m., ESPN		at North Carolina; Rivalry	L 76–86	6–5 (2–4)	21 – Daniels	7 – Hellems	4 – Beverly	Dean Smith Center (0); Chapel Hill, NC
January 27, 2021; 8:00 p.m., ACCN		Wake Forest; Rivalry	W 72–67	7–5 (3–4)	20 – Daniels	10 – Daniels	4 – Hayes	PNC Arena (25); Raleigh, NC
January 31, 2021; 6:00 p.m., ACCN		at Syracuse	L 73–76	7–6 (3–5)	24 – Hellems	14 – Bates	4 – Tied	Carrier Dome (0); Syracuse, NY
February 3, 2021; 9:00 p.m., ACCN		No. 14 Virginia	L 57–64	7–7 (3–6)	23 – Hellems	5 – Tied	3 – Tied	PNC Arena (25); Raleigh, NC
February 6, 2021; 12:00 p.m., ACCN		at Boston College	W 81–65	8–7 (4–6)	19 – Moore	7 – Tied	4 – Tied	Conte Forum (0); Chestnut Hill, MA
February 9, 2021; 6:30 p.m., ACCN		Syracuse	L 68–77	8–8 (4–7)	17 – Allen	7 – Bates	5 – Beverly	PNC Arena (25); Raleigh, NC
February 13, 2021; 4:00 p.m., ESPN		Duke; Rivalry	L 53–69	8–9 (4–8)	13 – Moore	7 – Bates	4 – Allen	PNC Arena (25); Raleigh, NC
February 17, 2021; 4:30 p.m., ACCN		at Pittsburgh	W 74–73	9–9 (5–8)	17 – Hellems	8 – Funderburk	9 – Hayes	Petersen Events Center (500); Pittsburgh, PA
February 20, 2021; 2:00 p.m., ACCRSN		at Wake Forest; Rivalry	W 80–62	10–9 (6–8)	14 – Tied	9 – Seabron	5 – Hayes	LJVM Coliseum (116); Winston-Salem, NC
February 24, 2021; 6:30 p.m., ACCN		at No. 15 Virginia	W 68–61	11–9 (7–8)	16 – Hayes	8 – Hellems	3 – Tied	John Paul Jones Arena (0); Charlottesville, VA
February 28, 2021; 4:00 p.m., ACCN		Pittsburgh	W 65–62	12–9 (8–8)	15 – Hellems	10 – Hellems	5 – Hellems	PNC Arena (500); Raleigh, NC
March 3, 2021; 7:00 p.m., ACCN		at Notre Dame	W 80–69	13–9 (9–8)	20 – Hayes	13 – Seabron	3 – Tied	Edmund P. Joyce Center (497); South Bend, IN
March 6, 2021; 2:00 p.m., ACCRSN		No. 22 Virginia Tech	Canceled due to COVID-19 issues					PNC Arena; Raleigh, NC
ACC Tournament
March 10, 2021; 12:00 p.m., ACCN	(9)	vs. (8) Syracuse; Second Round	L 68–89	13–10	14 – Funderburk	8 – Seabron	4 – Beverly	Greensboro Coliseum (2,820); Greensboro, NC
NIT
March 18, 2021; 7:00 p.m., ESPN	(3)	vs. (2) Davidson; First Round – Colorado State bracket	W 75–61	14–10	21 – Funderburk	8 – Bates	5 – Beverly	The Super Pit; Denton, TX
March 25, 2021; 7:00 p.m., ESPN	(3)	vs. (1) Colorado State; Quarterfinals – Colorado State bracket	L 61–65	14–11	15 – Hellems	9 – Funderburk	5 – Hellems	Comerica Center; Frisco, TX
*Non-conference game. ^{#}Rankings from AP Poll. (#) Tournament seedings in parentheses. All times are in Eastern Time.

Schedule Source:

== Rankings ==
Ranking movements Legend: ██ Increase in ranking ██ Decrease in ranking — = Not ranked RV = Received votes
	Week																	
Poll	Pre	1	2	3	4	5	6	7	8	9	10	11	12	13	14	15	16	Final
AP	—	—	—	—	—	RV	RV	RV	—	—	—	—	—	—	—	—	—	Not released
Coaches	—	—	RV	—	—	RV	RV	—	—	—	—	—	—	—	—	—	—	—

^Coaches did not release a Week 1 poll.
