= Brakefield =

Brakefield is a surname. Notable people with the surname include:

- Jaemyn Brakefield (born 2000), American basketball player
- Jim Brakefield (c.1919–2002), American football and baseball coach
- Paul Brakefield (born 1952), British evolutionary biologist

== See also ==
- Brakefield Green, a village in Norfolk, England
