= 2020–21 Georgia Tech Yellow Jackets men's basketball team =

American college basketball season

2020–21 Georgia Tech Yellow Jackets men's basketball

ACC tournament champions

NCAA tournament, first round
- Conference: Atlantic Coast Conference
- Record: 17–9 (11–6 ACC)
- Head coach: Josh Pastner (5th season)
- Assistant coaches: Eric Reveno; Julian Swartz; Anthony Wilkins
- Home arena: McCamish Pavilion

2020–21 ACC men's basketball standings
	Conf.				Overall
Team	W		L	PCT	W		L	PCT
No. 15 Virginia	13	–	4	.765	18	–	7	.720
No. 14 Florida State	11	–	4	.733	18	–	7	.720
No. 25 Virginia Tech	9	–	4	.692	15	–	7	.682
Georgia Tech †	11	–	6	.647	17	–	9	.654
Clemson	10	–	6	.625	16	–	8	.667
North Carolina	10	–	6	.625	18	–	11	.621
Louisville	8	–	5	.615	13	–	7	.650
Syracuse	9	–	7	.563	18	–	10	.643
NC State	9	–	8	.529	14	–	11	.560
Duke	9	–	9	.500	13	–	11	.542
Notre Dame	7	–	11	.389	11	–	15	.423
Pittsburgh	6	–	10	.375	10	–	12	.455
Miami (FL)	4	–	15	.211	10	–	17	.370
Wake Forest	3	–	15	.167	6	–	16	.273
Boston College	2	–	11	.154	4	–	16	.200
† 2021 ACC tournament winner Rankings from AP poll

The 2020–21 Georgia Tech Yellow Jackets men's basketball team represented the Georgia Institute of Technology during the 2020–21 NCAA Division I men's basketball season. They were led by fifth-year head coach Josh Pastner and played their home games at Hank McCamish Pavilion as members of the Atlantic Coast Conference. In a season limited due to the ongoing COVID-19 pandemic, the Yellow Jackets finished the season 17–9, 11–6 in ACC play to finish in fourth place. They defeated Miami in the quarterfinals of the ACC tournament and advanced to the championship game after Virginia was forced to withdraw from the tournament after a positive COVID-19 test. They defeated Florida State to win the tournament championship and received the conference's automatic bid to the NCAA tournament as the No. 9 seed in the Midwest region. They lost in the first round to Loyola. It was the first time since 2010 that the Yellow Jackets had participated in the NCAA Tournament, and their first ACC Championship since 1993.

== Previous season ==
The Yellow Jackets finished the 2019–20 season 17–14, 11–9 in ACC play to finish in fifth place. The team was banned from postseason play, including the conference tournament, due to NCAA rules violations.

== Offseason ==
=== Departures ===
Name	Number	Pos.	Height	Weight	Year	Hometown	Reason for departure
James Banks III	1	F/C	6'10"	250	Senior	Decatur, GA	Graduated
Shembari Phillips	2	G	6'4"	210	(redshirt) Senior	Atlanta, GA	Graduated
Evan Cole	3	G	6'10"	226	Sophomore	Cumming, GA	Transferred to Utah Valley
Asanti Price	23	G	6'5"	177	Freshman	Columbia, SC	Entered transfer portal
Kristian Sjolund	35	F	6'8"	213	Sophomore	Katy, TX	Transferred to UTEP
Shaheed Medlock	45	G	6'5"	196	Senior	Waycross, GA	Graduated

=== Incoming transfers ===
Name	Number	Pos.	Height	Weight	Year	Hometown	Previous School
Kyle Sturdivant	1	G	6'2"	198	Sophomore	Norcross, GA	USC
Rodney Howard	24	F	6'10"	241	Sophomore	Ypsilanti, MI	Georgia

== 2020 recruiting class ==
College recruiting information
Name	Hometown	School	Height	Weight	Commit date
Saba Gigiberia; C	Windsor, CA	Prolific Preparatory School	7 ft 0 in (2.13 m)	230 lb (100 kg)	Nov 11, 2019
Saba Gigiberia; C	Recruit ratings: Rivals: ESPN: (80)				
Tristan Maxwell; G	Huntersville, NC	North Mecklenburg	6 ft 2 in (1.88 m)	193 lb (88 kg)	Oct 21, 2019
Tristan Maxwell; G	Recruit ratings: Rivals: ESPN: (77)				
Jordan Meka; C	Marietta, GA	Mount Bethel Christian Academy	6 ft 8 in (2.03 m)	224 lb (102 kg)	Sep 24, 2019
Jordan Meka; C	Recruit ratings: Rivals: ESPN: (77)				
Overall recruit ranking:
Note: In many cases, Scout, Rivals, 247Sports, On3, and ESPN may conflict in their listings of height and weight.; In these cases, the average was taken. ESPN grades are on a 100-point scale.; Sources: "2020 Georgia Tech Commits". Rivals.; "Georgia Tech 2020 Basketball Commits". Scout.; "Georgia Tech Yellow Jackets". ESPN.; "Scout.com Team Recruiting Rankings". Scout.; "2020 Team Ranking". Rivals.

== Roster ==
2020–21 Georgia Tech Yellow Jackets men's basketball team
Players
Coaches

Pos.	#	Name	Height	Weight	Year	Previous school	Hometown
G	0	Michael Devoe	6 ft 5 in (1.96 m)	197 lb (89 kg)	Jr	Montverde Academy	Orlando, FL
G	1	Kyle Sturdivant	6 ft 2 in (1.88 m)	198 lb (90 kg)	So	Norcross HS; Southern California	Norcross, GA
F/C	2	Saba Gigiberia	7 ft 1 in (2.16 m)	250 lb (113 kg)	Fr	Prolific Preparatory School	Tbilisi, Georgia
G	3	Bubba Parham	5 ft 10 in (1.78 m)	160 lb (73 kg)	Jr	Brookwood HS; VMI	Snellville, GA
G/F	4	Jordan Usher	6 ft 7 in (2.01 m)	213 lb (97 kg)	Sr	Wheeler HS; Southern California	Canton, GA
F	5	Moses Wright	6 ft 9 in (2.06 m)	233 lb (106 kg)	Sr	William G. Enloe HS	Raleigh, NC
G	10	Jose Alvarado	6 ft 0 in (1.83 m)	179 lb (81 kg)	Sr	Christ the King Regional HS	Brooklyn, NY
G	11	Tristan Maxwell	6 ft 2 in (1.88 m)	209 lb (95 kg)	Fr	North Mecklenburg HS	Charlotte, NC
F	12	Khalid Moore	6 ft 7 in (2.01 m)	200 lb (91 kg)	Jr	Archbishop Molloy HS	Briarwood, NY
G	13	Coleman Boyd	6 ft 1 in (1.85 m)	173 lb (78 kg)	So	Mount Bethel Christian Academy	Smyrna, GA
F	14	David Didenko	6 ft 9 in (2.06 m)	232 lb (105 kg)	Jr	Palm Beach State College	Yakutsk, Russia
G	23	Jordan Meka	6 ft 8 in (2.03 m)	224 lb (102 kg)	Fr	Mount Bethel Christian Academy	Yaoundé, Cameroon
F	24	Rodney Howard	6 ft 10 in (2.08 m)	241 lb (109 kg)	So	Legacy Charter School; Georgia	Ypsilanti, MI
G	34	Niko Broadway	6 ft 3 in (1.91 m)	195 lb (88 kg)	So	St. Pius X HS	Atlanta, GA
F	35	Jehloni James	6 ft 6 in (1.98 m)	180 lb (82 kg)	So	Lanier HS	Sugar Hill, GA
G	45	Shaheed Medlock	6 ft 5 in (1.96 m)	196 lb (89 kg)	Sr	Ware County HS	Waycross, GA
G	55	Malachi Rice (W)	6 ft 0 in (1.83 m)	186 lb (84 kg)	Sr	Brebeuf Jesuit Prep	Indianapolis, IN

Head coach

- Josh Pastner (Arizona)

Assistant coach(es)

- Eric Reveno (Stanford)
- Julian Swartz (Carroll)
- Anthony Wilkins (Kent State)

Legend

- (C) Team captain
- (S) Suspended
- (I) Ineligible
- (W) Walk-on
- Injured
- Current redshirt

Roster
Last update: March 23, 2021

== Schedule and results ==
Date time, TV	Rank^{#}	Opponent^{#}	Result	Record	High points	High rebounds	High assists	Site (attendance) city, state
Regular season
November 25, 2020*; 9:00 p.m., ACCRSN		Georgia State; Georgia Tech Showcase	L 120–123 ^{4OT}	0–1	31 – Wright	20 – Wright	4 – Alvarado	McCamish Pavilion (1,200); Atlanta, GA
November 27, 2020*; 8:00 p.m., ACCRSN		Mercer; Georgia Tech Showcase	L 73–83	0–2	20 – Wright	8 – Usher	7 – Alvarado	McCamish Pavilion (1,200); Atlanta, GA
December 6, 2020*; 5:00 p.m., ESPN		vs. No. 20 Kentucky; Holiday Hoopsgiving	W 79–62	1–2	21 – Wright	8 – Wright	5 – Devoe	State Farm Arena (0); Atlanta, GA
December 9, 2020*; 7:15 p.m., ESPNU		at Nebraska; ACC–Big Ten Challenge	W 75–64	2–2	24 – Alvarado	8 – Tied	4 – Wright	Pinnacle Bank Arena (25); Lincoln, NE
December 15, 2020; 8:30 p.m., ACCN		at No. 15 Florida State	L 61–74	2–3 (0–1)	21 – Devoe	6 – Moore	4 – Moore	Donald L. Tucker Center (2,664); Tallahassee, FL
December 18, 2020*; 7:00 p.m., ACCRSN		Florida A&M	W 74–64	3–3	24 – Wright	8 – Parham	8 – Devoe	McCamish Pavilion (1,200); Atlanta, GA
December 20, 2020*; 6:00 p.m., ACCN		Delaware State	W 97–69	4–3	29 – Alvarado	6 – Gigiberia	6 – Usher	McCamish Pavilion (1,200); Atlanta, GA
December 30, 2020; 8:00 p.m., ACCRSN		North Carolina	W 72–67	5–3 (1–1)	20 – Tied	7 – Alvarado	7 – Alvarado	McCamish Pavilion (1,200); Atlanta, GA
January 3, 2021; 6:00 p.m., ACCN		Wake Forest	W 70–54	6–3 (2–1)	25 – Alvarado	8 – Usher	5 – Wright	McCamish Pavilion (1,200); Atlanta, GA
January 6, 2021; 7:00 p.m., ACCRSN		at Notre Dame	Postponed due to COVID-19					Purcell Pavilion; Notre Dame, IN
January 16, 2021; 2:00 p.m., ACCRSN		at NC State	Postponed due to COVID-19					PNC Arena; Raleigh, NC
January 20, 2021; 7:00 p.m., ACCRSN		No. 20 Clemson	W 83–65	7–3 (3–1)	22 – Devoe	4 – Tied	6 – Devoe	McCamish Pavilion (1,200); Atlanta, GA
January 23, 2021; 8:00 p.m., ACCN		at No. 13 Virginia	L 62–64	7–4 (3–2)	20 – Alvarado	6 – Usher	8 – Alvarado	John Paul Jones Arena (250); Charlottesville, VA
January 26, 2021; 9:00 p.m., ESPN		at Duke	L 68–75	7–5 (3–3)	26 – Alvarado	14 – Wright	6 – Wright	Cameron Indoor Stadium (0); Durham, NC
January 30, 2021; 4:00 p.m., ACCN		No. 16 Florida State	W 76–65	8–5 (4–3)	23 – Wright	8 – Tied	6 – Alvarado	McCamish Pavilion (1,200); Atlanta, GA
February 1, 2021; 2:00 p.m., ACCN		at Louisville	L 58–74	8–6 (4–4)	17 – Devoe	16 – Wright	4 – Alvarado	KFC Yum! Center (2,868); Louisville, KY
February 6, 2021; 8:00 p.m., ACCN		Notre Dame	W 82–80	9–6 (5–4)	19 – Tied	8 – Wright	5 – Tied	McCamish Pavilion (1,200); Atlanta, GA
February 10, 2021; 7:00 p.m., ACCRSN		No. 9 Virginia	L 49–57	9–7 (5–5)	18 – Alvarado	6 – Wright	4 – Usher	McCamish Pavilion (1,200); Atlanta, GA
February 12, 2021; 8:00 p.m., ACCN		at Clemson	L 72–74	9–8 (5–6)	23 – Devoe	6 – Usher	6 – Devoe	Littlejohn Coliseum (1,876); Clemson, SC
February 14, 2021; 4:00 p.m., ACCN		Pittsburgh	W 71–65	10–8 (6–6)	24 – Wright	7 – Alvarado	5 – Alvarado	McCamish Pavilion (1,200); Atlanta, GA
February 17, 2021; 12:00 p.m., ACCN		Boston College	Postponed due to COVID-19					McCamish Pavilion; Atlanta, GA
February 20, 2021; 12:00 p.m., ACCRSN		at Miami (FL)	W 87–60	11–8 (7–6)	29 – Devoe	12 – Wright	6 – Alvarado	Watsco Center (0); Coral Gables, FL
February 23, 2021; 7:00 p.m., ACCRSN		at No. 16 Virginia Tech	W 69–53	12–8 (8–6)	26 – Wright	10 – Wright	4 – Devoe	Cassell Coliseum (250); Blacksburg, VA
February 27, 2021; 12:00 p.m., ACCN		Syracuse	W 84–77	13–8 (9–6)	31 – Wright	16 – Wright	7 – Usher	McCamish Pavilion (1,200); Atlanta, GA
March 2, 2021; 8:00 p.m., ACCN		Duke	W 81–77 ^{OT}	14–8 (10–6)	29 – Wright	14 – Wright	5 – Wright	McCamish Pavilion (1,200); Atlanta, GA
March 5, 2021; 8:00 p.m., ACCN		at Wake Forest	W 75–63	15–8 (11–6)	20 – Devoe	6 – Usher	5 – Alvarado	LJVM Coliseum (1,229); Winston-Salem, NC
ACC tournament
March 11, 2021; 2:30 p.m., ESPN2	(4)	vs. (13) Miami; Quarterfinals	W 70–66	16–8	15 – Usher	6 – Wright	7 – Devoe	Greensboro Coliseum (2,820); Greensboro, NC
March 12, 2021; 6:30 p.m., ESPN2	(4)	vs. (1) No. 16 Virginia; Semifinals	Georgia Tech advanced due to COVID-19 issues at Virginia					Greensboro Coliseum; Greensboro, NC
March 13, 2021; 8:30 p.m., ESPN	(4)	vs. (2) No. 15 Florida State; Championship	W 80–75	17–8	20 – Devoe	8 – Wright	3 – Devoe	Greensboro Coliseum (2,820); Greensboro, NC
NCAA tournament
March 19, 2021; 4:00 p.m., TBS	(9 MW)	vs. (8 MW) No. 17 Loyola–Chicago; First Round	L 60–71	17–9	15 – Usher	5 – Tied	4 – Devoe	Hinkle Fieldhouse; Indianapolis, IN
*Non-conference game. ^{#}Rankings from AP Poll. (#) Tournament seedings in parentheses. MW=Midwest. All times are in Eastern Time.

== Rankings ==
Ranking movements Legend: ██ Increase in ranking ██ Decrease in ranking — = Not ranked RV = Received votes
	Week																	
Poll	Pre	1	2	3	4	5	6	7	8	9	10	11	12	13	14	15	16	Final
AP	—	—	—	—	—	—	—	—	—	—	—	RV	—	—	—	—	RV	Not released
Coaches	RV	—	—	—	—	—	—	—	—	—	RV	—	—	—	—	—	RV	RV

*AP does not release post-NCAA Tournament rankings
