= 2020–21 Boston College Eagles men's basketball team =

American college basketball season

2020–21 Boston College Eagles men's basketball
- Conference: Atlantic Coast Conference
- Record: 4–16 (2–11 ACC)
- Head coach: Jim Christian (7th season), fired 2/15 (interim, 1st season); Scott Spinelli
- Assistant coaches: Bill Wuczynski; Chris Cheeks
- Home arena: Conte Forum

2020–21 ACC men's basketball standings
	Conf.				Overall
Team	W		L	PCT	W		L	PCT
No. 15 Virginia	13	–	4	.765	18	–	7	.720
No. 14 Florida State	11	–	4	.733	18	–	7	.720
No. 25 Virginia Tech	9	–	4	.692	15	–	7	.682
Georgia Tech †	11	–	6	.647	17	–	9	.654
Clemson	10	–	6	.625	16	–	8	.667
North Carolina	10	–	6	.625	18	–	11	.621
Louisville	8	–	5	.615	13	–	7	.650
Syracuse	9	–	7	.563	18	–	10	.643
NC State	9	–	8	.529	14	–	11	.560
Duke	9	–	9	.500	13	–	11	.542
Notre Dame	7	–	11	.389	11	–	15	.423
Pittsburgh	6	–	10	.375	10	–	12	.455
Miami (FL)	4	–	15	.211	10	–	17	.370
Wake Forest	3	–	15	.167	6	–	16	.273
Boston College	2	–	11	.154	4	–	16	.200
† 2021 ACC tournament winner Rankings from AP poll

The 2020–21 Boston College Eagles men's basketball team represented Boston College during the 2020–21 NCAA Division I men's basketball season. The Eagles, were led by seventh-year head coach Jim Christian, played their home games at the Conte Forum as members of the Atlantic Coast Conference. Christian was fired on February 15, 2021, after starting the season 3–13. Assistant Coach Scott Spinelli served as the interim head coach to finish the season. In a season limited due to the ongoing COVID-19 pandemic, the Eagles finished the season 4–16, 2–11 in ACC play to finish in last place. They lost to Duke in the first round of the ACC tournament.

On March 15, the school named College of Charleston head coach Earl Grant the new coach for the Eagles.

== Previous season ==
The Eagles finished the 2019–20 season finished the season 13–19, 7–13 in ACC play to finish in a tie for 10th place. They lost to Notre Dame in the second round of the ACC tournament. The tournament and all other postseason tournaments were thereafter canceled due to the COVID-19 pandemic.

== Offseason ==
=== Departures ===
Name	Number	Pos.	Height	Weight	Year	Hometown	Reason for departure
Jarius Hamilton	1	F	6'8"	234	Sophomore	Charlotte, NC	Transferred to Maryland
Julian Rishwain	2	G	6'5"	190	Freshman	Los Angeles, CA	Transferred to San Francisco
Jared Hamilton	3	G	6'4"	203	Senior	Charlotte, NC	Graduated
Derryck Thornton	11	G	6'3"	195	Graduate student	Los Angeles, CA	Graduated
Nik Popovic	21	F	6'11"	253	Senior	Banja Luka	Graduated
Matt DiLuccio	22	G	5'11"	180	Senior	Rockville Centre, NY	Graduated
Chris Herren Jr.	24	G	6'3"	174	Sophomore	Portsmouth, RI	Transferred to San Diego

=== Incoming transfers ===
Name	Number	Pos.	Height	Weight	Year	Hometown	Previous school
Frederick Scott	0	F	6'8"	230	Graduate student	Munster, IN	Transferred from Rider
Andre Adams	12	F	6'9"	230	Graduate student	Avondale, AZ	Transferred from Southern Utah
Rich Kelly	22	G	6'1"	175	Graduate student	Shelton, CT	Transferred from Quinnipiac
James Karnik	33	F/C	6'9"	230	Senior	Surrey, British Columbia	Transferred from Lehigh

=== 2020 recruiting class ===
College recruiting
Name	Hometown	School	Height	Weight	Commit date
Demarr Langford; SF	Wolfeboro, NH	Brewster Academy	6 ft 4 in (1.93 m)	185 lb (84 kg)	Sep 21, 2019
Demarr Langford; SF	Recruit ratings: Scout: Rivals: 247Sports: ESPN:				
Justin Vander Baan; C	Whitinsville, MA	Whitinsville Christian High School	7 ft 0 in (2.13 m)	215 lb (98 kg)	Aug 28, 2019
Justin Vander Baan; C	Recruit ratings: Scout: Rivals: 247Sports: ESPN:				
Overall recruit ranking:
Note: In many cases, Scout, Rivals, 247Sports, On3, and ESPN may conflict in their listings of height and weight.; In these cases, the average was taken. ESPN grades are on a 100-point scale.; Sources: "Boston College Eagles". ESPN.; "2020 Team Ranking". Rivals.

== Roster ==
2020–21 Boston College Eagles men's basketball team
Players
Coaches

Pos.	#	Name	Height	Weight	Year	Previous school	Hometown
F	0	Frederick Scott	6 ft 8 in (2.03 m)	230 lb (104 kg)	GS	Simeon; Rider	Munster, Indiana
F	1	C. J. Felder	6 ft 7 in (2.01 m)	230 lb (104 kg)	So	Sumter High School	Sumter, South Carolina
G	4	Makai Ashton-Langford	6 ft 3 in (1.91 m)	185 lb (84 kg)	RS Jr	Providence	Worcester, Massachusetts
G	5	Jay Heath	6 ft 3 in (1.91 m)	175 lb (79 kg)	So	Woodrow Wilson High School	Washington, D.C.
G	10	Wynston Tabbs	6 ft 2 in (1.88 m)	193 lb (88 kg)	RS So	St. Mary's Ryken High School	Leonardtown, Maryland
G	11	Abe Atiyeh	6 ft 0 in (1.83 m)	175 lb (79 kg)	Fr	Moravian Academy	Bethlehem, Pennsylvania
F	12	Andre Adams	6 ft 9 in (2.06 m)	230 lb (104 kg)	GS	Westview; Southern Utah	Avondale, Arizona
F/C	13	Luka Kraljević	6 ft 10 in (2.08 m)	228 lb (103 kg)	Sr	Don Bosco Prep	Domžale, Slovenia
F	14	Kamari Williams	6 ft 7 in (2.01 m)	200 lb (91 kg)	So	St. Andrew's Episcopal School	Sandy Spring, Maryland
G	15	DeMarr Langford	6 ft 5 in (1.96 m)	195 lb (88 kg)	Fr	Brewster Academy	Worcester, Massachusetts
G	22	Rich Kelly	6 ft 1 in (1.85 m)	175 lb (79 kg)	GS	Cheshire Academy; Quinnipiac	Shelton, Connecticut
F	23	Andrew Kenny (W)	6 ft 6 in (1.98 m)	205 lb (93 kg)	So	Choate Rosemary Hall	Seattle, Washington
G	25	Jonathan Noel (W)	6 ft 3 in (1.91 m)	205 lb (93 kg)	So	St. Mark's School	Everett, Massachusetts
G	30	Sam Holtze (W)	5 ft 10 in (1.78 m)	150 lb (68 kg)	Sr	Notre Dame	Manhattan Beach, California
C	32	Justin Vander Baan	7 ft 0 in (2.13 m)	230 lb (104 kg)	Fr	Whitinsville Christian	Northbridge, Massachusetts
F/C	33	James Karnik	6 ft 9 in (2.06 m)	230 lb (104 kg)	Sr	Orangeville Prep; Lehigh	Surrey, British Columbia
F	34	Will Jackowitz	6 ft 8 in (2.03 m)	205 lb (93 kg)	Sr	Wellesley	Wellesley, Massachusetts
F	41	Steffon Mitchell	6 ft 8 in (2.03 m)	220 lb (100 kg)	Sr	Sunrise Christian Academy	Shakopee, Minnesota

Head coach

- Jim Christian (Rhode Island)

Assistant coach(es)

- Scott Spinelli (Boston University)
- Bill Wuczynski (UNLV)
- Chris Cheeks (VCU)

Legend

- (C) Team captain
- (S) Suspended
- (I) Ineligible
- (W) Walk-on
- Injured
- Current redshirt

Roster
Last update: November 18, 2020

== Schedule and results ==
Date time, TV	Rank^{#}	Opponent^{#}	Result	Record	High points	High rebounds	High assists	Site (attendance) city, state
Regular season
November 25, 2020*; 7:00 p.m., ESPN		vs. No. 3 Villanova; 2K Empire Classic	L 67–76	0–1	16 – Heath	11 – Mitchell	3 – Ashton-Langford	Mohegan Sun Arena (0); Uncasville, CT
November 26, 2020*; 9:30 p.m., ESPN		vs. Rhode Island; 2K Empire Classic	W 69–64	1–1	16 – Tabbs	10 – Tabbs	2 – Tied	Mohegan Sun Arena (0); Uncasville, CT
November 30, 2020*; 6:00 p.m., ESPNU		vs. St. John's; Bubbleville	L 93–97	1–2	23 – Tabbs	8 – Mitchell	4 – Ashton-Langford	Mohegan Sun Arena (0); Uncasville, CT
December 3, 2020*; 9:30 p.m., ESPN		vs. Florida; Legends Classic	L 70–90	1–3	13 – Kelly	6 – Karnik	3 – Heath	Mohegan Sun Arena (0); Uncasville, CT
December 8, 2020*; 7:00 p.m., ESPNU		at Minnesota; ACC–Big Ten Challenge	L 80–85 ^{OT}	1–4	24 – Tabbs	11 – Felder	6 – Ashton-Langford	Williams Arena (0); Minneapolis, MN
December 12, 2020; 1:00 p.m., ESPNU		Syracuse	L 63–101	1–5 (0–1)	20 – Karnik	8 – Karnik	6 – Kelly	Conte Forum (0); Chestnut Hill, MA
December 22, 2020*; 12:00 p.m., ACCN		Maine	W 78–62	2–5 (0–1)	16 – Heath	7 – Karnik	6 – Kelly	Conte Forum (0); Chestnut Hill, MA
December 30, 2020; 8:00 p.m., ACCN		at NC State	L 76–79	2–6 (0–2)	18 – Tabbs	12 – Mitchell	3 – Ashton-Langford	PNC Arena (0); Raleigh, NC
January 2, 2021; 12:00 p.m., ACCRSN		Louisville	L 64–76	2–7 (0–3)	20 – Heath	7 – Felder	2 – Heath	Conte Forum (0); Chestnut Hill, MA
January 6, 2021; 8:30 p.m., ACCN		at No. 21 Duke	L 82–83	2–8 (0–4)	24 – Felder	8 – Langford	4 – Tied	Cameron Indoor Stadium (0); Durham, NC
January 9, 2021; 2:00 p.m., ACCN		No. 22 Virginia	L 49–61	2–9 (0–5)	14 – Langford	9 – Tied	3 – Heath	Conte Forum (0); Chestnut Hill, MA
January 12, 2021; 7:00 p.m., ACCRSN		Miami (FL)	W 84–62	3–9 (1–5)	27 – Kelly	8 – Felder	4 – Tied	Conte Forum (0); Chestnut Hill, MA
January 16, 2021; 4:00 p.m., ACCN		at Notre Dame	L 70–80	3–10 (1–6)	16 – Mitchell	13 – Mitchell	3 – Tied	Edmund P. Joyce Center (78); South Bend, IN
January 20, 2021; 7:00 p.m., ACCN		at No. 16 Virginia Tech	Postponed					Cassell Coliseum; Blacksburg, VA
January 23, 2021; 6:00 p.m., ACCN		Pittsburgh	Postponed					Conte Forum; Chestnut Hill, MA
January 27, 2021; 9:00 p.m., ACCRSN		at Clemson	Postponed					Littlejohn Coliseum; Clemson, SC
January 30, 2021; 12:00 p.m., ACCRSN		at No. 25 Louisville	Postponed					KFC Yum! Center; Louisville, KY
February 2, 2021; 9:00 p.m., ACCN		No. 20 Florida State	Postponed					Conte Forum; Chestnut Hill, MA
February 6, 2021; 12:00 p.m., ACCN		NC State	L 65–81	3–11 (1–7)	20 – Heath	7 – Mitchell	2 – Kelly	Conte Forum (0); Chestnut Hill, MA
February 10, 2021; 7:00 p.m., ACCN		Wake Forest	L 65–69	3–12 (1–8)	20 – Heath	14 – Felder	4 – Kelly	Conte Forum (0); Chestnut Hill, MA
February 13, 2021; 2:00 p.m., ACCN		at Syracuse	L 67–75	3–13 (1–9)	14 – Kelly	12 – Felder	4 – Tied	Carrier Dome (0); Syracuse, NY
February 17, 2021; 12:00 p.m., ACCN		at Georgia Tech	Postponed					McCamish Pavilion; Atlanta, GA
February 23, 2021; 9:00 p.m., ACCN		North Carolina	Postponed					Conte Forum; Chestnut Hill, MA
February 27, 2021; 2:00 p.m., ACCN		Notre Dame	W 94–90	4–13 (2–9)	19 – Tied	8 – Mitchell	6 – Ashton-Langford	Conte Forum (0); Chestnut Hill, MA
March 3, 2021; 9:00 p.m., ACCN		at No. 11 Florida State	L 64–93	4–14 (2–10)	28 – Heath	7 – Scott	2 – Tied	Donald L. Tucker Center (2,950); Tallahassee, FL
March 5, 2021; 6:00 p.m., ACCN		at Miami (FL)	L 76–80	4–15 (2–11)	15 – Karnik	8 – Scott	8 – Ashton-Langford	Watsco Center (0); Coral Gables, FL
ACC tournament
March 9, 2021; 4:30 p.m., ACCN	(15)	vs. (10) Duke; First round	L 51–86	4–16	9 – Ashton-Langford	5 – 3 tied	4 – Ashton-Langford	Greensboro Coliseum (2,820); Greensboro, NC
*Non-conference game. ^{#}Rankings from AP Poll. (#) Tournament seedings in parentheses. All times are in Eastern Time.

== Rankings ==
Ranking movements Legend: — = Not ranked
	Week																	
Poll	Pre	1	2	3	4	5	6	7	8	9	10	11	12	13	14	15	16	Final
AP	—	—	—	—	—	—	—	—	—	—	—	—	—	—	—	—	—	Not released
Coaches	—	—	—	—	—	—	—	—	—	—	—	—	—	—	—	—	—	—

*AP does not release post-NCAA tournament rankings
^Coaches did not release a Week 2 poll.
