= 2020–21 Duke Blue Devils men's basketball team =

American college basketball season

2020–21 Duke Blue Devils men's basketball
- Conference: Atlantic Coast Conference
- Record: 13–11 (9–9 ACC)
- Head coach: Mike Krzyzewski (41st season)
- Assistant coaches: Nate James; Jon Scheyer; Chris Carrawell
- Home arena: Cameron Indoor Stadium

2020–21 ACC men's basketball standings
	Conf.				Overall
Team	W		L	PCT	W		L	PCT
No. 15 Virginia	13	–	4	.765	18	–	7	.720
No. 14 Florida State	11	–	4	.733	18	–	7	.720
No. 25 Virginia Tech	9	–	4	.692	15	–	7	.682
Georgia Tech †	11	–	6	.647	17	–	9	.654
Clemson	10	–	6	.625	16	–	8	.667
North Carolina	10	–	6	.625	18	–	11	.621
Louisville	8	–	5	.615	13	–	7	.650
Syracuse	9	–	7	.563	18	–	10	.643
NC State	9	–	8	.529	14	–	11	.560
Duke	9	–	9	.500	13	–	11	.542
Notre Dame	7	–	11	.389	11	–	15	.423
Pittsburgh	6	–	10	.375	10	–	12	.455
Miami (FL)	4	–	15	.211	10	–	17	.370
Wake Forest	3	–	15	.167	6	–	16	.273
Boston College	2	–	11	.154	4	–	16	.200
† 2021 ACC tournament winner Rankings from AP poll

The 2020–21 Duke Blue Devils men's basketball team represented Duke University during the United States 2020–21 NCAA Division I men's basketball season. They were coached by 41st-year head coach, Mike Krzyzewski. The Blue Devils played their home games at Cameron Indoor Stadium in Durham, North Carolina, as a member of the Atlantic Coast Conference.

Known for consistent high-level performance under Krzyzewski's tenure, the Blue Devils struggled to match their norm this season. Duke fell out of the AP and Coaches Poll rankings within the first few weeks and struggled to maintain a winning record. The Blue Devils finished the 2020–21 season 13–11, and 9–9 to finish in tenth place in ACC play. Duke spent much of the late season on the bubble, according to bracketologists, and ultimately their season ended when a positive COVID-19 test forced them to drop out of the ACC tournament ahead of the quarterfinals. Duke missed the NCAA tournament for the first time since 1995.

== Previous season ==
The Blue Devils finished the 2019–20 season 25–6, and 15–5 to finish in a tie for second place in ACC play. The team was scheduled to play NC State in the quarterfinals of the ACC tournament before the tournament was canceled due to the COVID-19 pandemic. The 2020 NCAA tournament was also canceled due to the pandemic.

== Offseason ==
=== Departures ===
Name	Pos.	Height	Weight	Year	Hometown	Reason for departure
Justin Robinson	F	6'9"	202	Senior (redshirt)	San Antonio, TX	Completed college eligibility
Javin DeLaurier	F	6'10"	237	Senior	Charlottesville, VA	Graduated; free-agent acquisition by the Charlotte Hornets
Jack White	F	6'7"	222	Senior	Canberra, Australia	Graduated
Alex O'Connell	G	6'6"	190	Junior	Roswell, GA	Transferred to Creighton
Tre Jones	G	6'3"	185	Sophomore	Apple Valley, MN	Declared for 2020 NBA draft; selected 41st overall by the San Antonio Spurs
Vernon Carey Jr.	C	6'10"	275	Freshman	Southwest Ranches, FL	Declared for 2020 NBA draft; selected 32nd overall by the Charlotte Hornets
Cassius Stanley	G	6'5"	185	Freshman	Los Angeles, CA	Declared for 2020 NBA draft; selected 54th overall by the Indiana Pacers

=== 2020 recruiting class ===
The 2020 recruiting class was ranked third in the nation by 247 Sports' Composite Ranking.

College recruiting
Name	Hometown	School	Height	Weight	Commit date
Jeremy Roach; PG	Leesburg, VA	Paul VI Catholic HS	6 ft 2 in (1.88 m)	180 lb (82 kg)	Mar 8, 2019
Jeremy Roach; PG	Recruit ratings: Rivals: 247Sports: ESPN: (94)				
Jalen Johnson; SF	Glendale, WI	Nicolet High School (WI)	6 ft 8 in (2.03 m)	215 lb (98 kg)	Jul 4, 2019
Jalen Johnson; SF	Recruit ratings: Rivals: 247Sports: ESPN: (94)				
D. J. Steward; SG	Chicago, IL	Whitney Young HS	6 ft 3 in (1.91 m)	160 lb (73 kg)	Sep 18, 2019
D. J. Steward; SG	Recruit ratings: Rivals: 247Sports: ESPN: (92)				
Jaemyn Brakefield; PF	Jackson, MS	Huntington Prep	6 ft 8 in (2.03 m)	215 lb (98 kg)	Oct 4, 2019
Jaemyn Brakefield; PF	Recruit ratings: Rivals: 247Sports: ESPN: (89)				
Mark Williams; C	Norfolk, VA	IMG Academy (FL)	7 ft 0 in (2.13 m)	230 lb (100 kg)	Nov 1, 2019
Mark Williams; C	Recruit ratings: Rivals: 247Sports: ESPN: (89)				
Henry Coleman III; PF	Richmond, VA	Trinity Episcopal School	6 ft 8 in (2.03 m)	240 lb (110 kg)	Sep 27, 2019
Henry Coleman III; PF	Recruit ratings: Rivals: 247Sports: ESPN: (85)				
Overall recruit ranking:
Note: In many cases, Scout, Rivals, 247Sports, On3, and ESPN may conflict in their listings of height and weight.; In these cases, the average was taken. ESPN grades are on a 100-point scale.; Sources: "2020 Duke Commits". Rivals.; "2020 Team Ranking". Rivals.

=== 2021 recruiting class ===
College recruiting (2021)
Name	Hometown	School	Height	Weight	Commit date
AJ Griffin; SF	Ossining, NY	Archbishop Stepinac	6 ft 7 in (2.01 m)	203 lb (92 kg)	Nov 4, 2019
AJ Griffin; SF	Recruit ratings: Rivals: 247Sports: ESPN: (89)				
Paolo Banchero; PF	Seattle, WA	O'Dea	6 ft 9 in (2.06 m)	232 lb (105 kg)	Aug 20, 2020
Paolo Banchero; PF	Recruit ratings: Rivals: 247Sports: ESPN: (97)				
Trevor Keels; SG	Clinton, MD	Paul VI Catholic	6 ft 5 in (1.96 m)	210 lb (95 kg)	Apr 2, 2021
Trevor Keels; SG	Recruit ratings: Rivals: 247Sports: ESPN: (90)				
Jaylen Blakes; CG	Somerset, NJ	Blair Academy	6 ft 2 in (1.88 m)	185 lb (84 kg)	Apr 19, 2021
Jaylen Blakes; CG	Recruit ratings: Rivals: 247Sports: ESPN: (82)				
Overall recruit ranking: Rivals: 3 247Sports: 3
Note: In many cases, Scout, Rivals, 247Sports, On3, and ESPN may conflict in their listings of height and weight.; In these cases, the average was taken. ESPN grades are on a 100-point scale.; Sources: "2021 Team Ranking". Rivals.

== Roster ==
2020–21 Duke Blue Devils men's basketball team
Players
Coaches

Pos.	#	Name	Height	Weight	Year	Previous school	Hometown
F	0	Wendell Moore Jr.	6 ft 5 in (1.96 m)	216 lb (98 kg)	So	Cox Mill	Charlotte, NC
G	2	D. J. Steward	6 ft 2 in (1.88 m)	163 lb (74 kg)	Fr	Whitney Young	Chicago, IL
G	3	Jeremy Roach	6 ft 1 in (1.85 m)	175 lb (79 kg)	Fr	Paul VI	Leesburg, VA
F	5	Jaemyn Brakefield	6 ft 8 in (2.03 m)	216 lb (98 kg)	Fr	Huntington Prep	Jackson, MS
F	12	Patrick Tapé	6 ft 9 in (2.06 m)	233 lb (106 kg)	GS	Columbia	Charlotte, NC
F	13	Joey Baker	6 ft 6 in (1.98 m)	201 lb (91 kg)	Jr	Trinity Christian School	Fayetteville, NC
G	14	Jordan Goldwire	6 ft 2 in (1.88 m)	184 lb (83 kg)	Sr	Norcross	Norcross, GA
C	15	Mark Williams	7 ft 0 in (2.13 m)	243 lb (110 kg)	Fr	IMG Academy	Virginia Beach, VA
F	21	Matthew Hurt	6 ft 9 in (2.06 m)	235 lb (107 kg)	So	John Marshall	Rochester, MN
G	30	Michael Savarino (W)	6 ft 0 in (1.83 m)	185 lb (84 kg)	So	Durham Academy	Durham, NC
F	34	Henry Coleman III	6 ft 7 in (2.01 m)	229 lb (104 kg)	Fr	Trinity Episcopal	Richmond, VA
F	45	Keenan Worthington (W)	6 ft 9 in (2.06 m)	225 lb (102 kg)	So	Blair Academy	Chapel Hill, NC
G	51	Mike Buckmire	6 ft 2 in (1.88 m)	175 lb (79 kg)	Sr	Germantown Friends School	Blue Bell, PA

Head coach

Mike Krzyzewski (Army)

Assistant coach(es)

- Nate James (Duke)
- Jon Scheyer (Duke)
- Chris Carrawell (Duke)

Legend

- (C) Team captain
- (S) Suspended
- (I) Ineligible
- (W) Walk-on
- Injured
- Current redshirt

Roster
Last update: November 10, 2020

=== Depth chart ===
Pos.	Starting 5	Bench 1	Bench 2
C	Mark Williams	Henry Coleman III
PF	Matthew Hurt	Jaemyn Brakefield	Keenan Worthington
SF	Wendell Moore Jr.	Joey Baker	Patrick Tapé
SG	D. J. Steward	Mike Buckmire
PG	Jeremy Roach	Jordan Goldwire	Michael Savarino

== Schedule and results ==
Due to the ongoing coronavirus pandemic, the start of the season was pushed back from the scheduled start of November 10. On September 16, 2020, the NCAA announced that November 25 would be the new start date. Matchups for ACC–Big Ten Challenge were released on October 30. The Champions Classic, which was originally to be held on November 10, was later moved to December 1 and was to be held in Orlando. However, due to disagreements between ESPN, who was staging the event (and others), over health and safety protocols related to COVID-19, the event was canceled. It was hoped that the event could be still held elsewhere. It was later reported that the Blue Devils would play their Champions Classic game at Duke, while Kentucky and Kansas would play in Indianapolis, due to conflicting COVID-19 protocols by the respective schools.

Prior to the start of the season, it was announced that Duke would not play its scheduled season opener against Gardner–Webb, which had a positive coronavirus test within its team. On December 10, 2020, the school announced that it would cancel the remaining non-conference games, meaning games already postponed would not be made up.

Date time, TV	Rank^{#}	Opponent^{#}	Result	Record	High points	High rebounds	High assists	Site (attendance) city, state
Regular season
November 25, 2020	No. 8	Gardner–Webb	Postponed. Rescheduled for December 19.					Cameron Indoor Stadium; Durham, NC
November 28, 2020*; 2:00 p.m., ACCNX	No. 8	Coppin State	W 81–71	1–0	24 – Steward	19 – Johnson	5 – Johnson	Cameron Indoor Stadium (0); Durham, NC
December 1, 2020*; 7:30 p.m., ESPN	No. 6	No. 8 Michigan State; Champions Classic	L 69–75	1–1	21 – Hurt	13 – Hurt	2 – Roach	Cameron Indoor Stadium (0); Durham, NC
December 4, 2020*; 7:00 p.m., ACCRSN	No. 6	Bellarmine	W 76–54	2–1	24 – Hurt	7 – Williams	6 – Tied	Cameron Indoor Stadium (0); Durham, NC
December 6, 2020	No. 6	Elon	Canceled					Cameron Indoor Stadium; Durham, NC
December 8, 2020*; 9:30 p.m., ESPN	No. 10	No. 6 Illinois; ACC–Big Ten Challenge	L 68–83	2–2	19 – Hurt	7 – Tied	7 – Roach	Cameron Indoor Stadium (0); Durham, NC
December 12, 2020	No. 10	Charleston Southern	Canceled					Cameron Indoor Stadium; Durham, NC
December 16, 2020; 9:00 pm, ESPN	No. 21	at Notre Dame	W 75–65	3–2 (1–0)	18 – Hurt	7 – Steward	3 – Hurt	Purcell Pavilion (89); Notre Dame, IN
December 19, 2020	No. 21	Gardner–Webb	Canceled					Cameron Indoor Stadium; Durham, NC
December 29, 2020; 8:00 pm, ACCN	No. 20	Pittsburgh	Canceled					Cameron Indoor Stadium; Durham, NC
January 2, 2021; 8:00 pm, ESPN2	No. 20	at No. 18 Florida State	Canceled					Donald L. Tucker Center; Tallahassee, FL
January 6, 2021; 8:30 pm, ACCN	No. 21	Boston College	W 83–82	4–2 (2–0)	25 – Moore	11 – Hurt	6 – Goldwire	Cameron Indoor Stadium (0); Durham, NC
January 9, 2021; 12:00 pm, ACCN	No. 21	Wake Forest	W 79–68	5–2 (3–0)	26 – Hurt	8 – Moore	5 – Goldwire	Cameron Indoor Stadium (0); Durham, NC
January 12, 2021; 7:00 pm, ACCN	No. 19	at No. 20 Virginia Tech	L 67–74	5–3 (3–1)	22 – Roach	11 – Hurt	4 – Tied	Cassell Coliseum (250); Blacksburg, VA
January 19, 2021; 9:00 pm, ESPN		at Pittsburgh	L 73–79	5–4 (3–2)	24 – Johnson	15 – Johnson	7 – Johnson	Petersen Events Center (500); Pittsburgh, PA
January 23, 2021; 4:00 pm, ESPN		at Louisville	L 65–70	5–5 (3–3)	24 – Hurt	8 – Hurt	3 – Moore Jr.	KFC Yum! Center (3,219); Louisville, KY
January 26, 2021; 9:00 pm, ESPN		Georgia Tech	W 75–68	6–5 (4–3)	19 – Steward	8 – Hurt	7 – Goldwire	Cameron Indoor Stadium (0); Durham, NC
January 30, 2021; 12:00 pm, ESPN2		Clemson	W 79–53	7–5 (5–3)	13 – Hurt	8 – Johnson	5 – Tied	Cameron Indoor Stadium (0); Durham, NC
February 1, 2021; 7:00 pm, ESPN		at Miami	L 75–77	7–6 (5–4)	21 – Hurt	7 – Johnson	3 – Moore Jr.	Watsco Center (0); Miami, FL
February 6, 2021; 6:00 pm, ESPN		North Carolina; Rivalry	L 87–91	7–7 (5–5)	16 – Roach	8 – Williams	5 – Roach	Cameron Indoor Stadium (0); Durham, NC
February 9, 2021; 4:30 pm, ACCN		Notre Dame	L 89–93	7–8 (5–6)	24 – Moore Jr.	10 – Moore Jr.	4 – Goldwire	Cameron Indoor Stadium (0); Durham, NC
February 13, 2021; 4:00 pm, ESPN		at NC State	W 69–53	8–8 (6–6)	24 – Hurt	5 – Brakefield	4 – Steward	PNC Arena (25); Raleigh, NC
February 17, 2021; 8:30 pm, ACCN		at Wake Forest	W 84–60	9–8 (7–6)	22 – Hurt	7 – Tied	4 – Tied	LJVM Coliseum (102); Winston-Salem, NC
February 20, 2021; 8:00 pm, ESPN		No. 7 Virginia	W 66–65	10–8 (8–6)	22 – Hurt	5 – Tied	7 – Moore	Cameron Indoor Stadium (0); Durham, NC
February 22, 2021; 7:00 pm, ESPN		Syracuse	W 85–71	11–8 (9–6)	21 – Steward	11 – Williams	7 – Tied	Cameron Indoor Stadium (0); Durham, NC
February 27, 2021; 6:00 pm, ESPN		Louisville	L 73–80 ^{OT}	11–9 (9–7)	37 – Hurt	9 – Moore Jr.	6 – Goldwire	Cameron Indoor Stadium (0); Durham, NC
March 2, 2021; 8:00 pm, ACCN		at Georgia Tech	L 77–81 ^{OT}	11–10 (9–8)	20 – Moore Jr.	8 – Moore Jr.	8 – Goldwire	Hank McCamish Pavilion (1,200); Atlanta, GA
March 6, 2021; 6:00 pm, ESPN		at North Carolina; Rivalry	L 73–91	11–11 (9–9)	16 – Roach	8 – Williams	5 – Roach	Dean Smith Center (3,263); Chapel Hill, NC
ACC Tournament
March 9, 2021; 4:30 pm, ACCN	(10)	vs. (15) Boston College; First round	W 86–51	12–11	17 – Steward	7 – Hurt	5 – Roach	Greensboro Coliseum (2,820); Greensboro, NC
March 10, 2021; 6:30 pm, ACCN	(10)	vs. (7) Louisville; Second round	W 70–56	13–11	23 – Williams	19 – Williams	5 – Moore Jr.	Greensboro Coliseum (2,820); Greensboro, NC
March 11, 2021; 6:30 pm, ESPN	(10)	vs. (2) No. 15 Florida State; Quarterfinals	Withdrew from tournament due to COVID-19 positive test					Greensboro Coliseum; Greensboro, NC
*Non-conference game. ^{#}Rankings from AP Poll. (#) Tournament seedings in parentheses. All times are in Eastern Time.

== Rankings ==
On January 18, 2021, Duke fell out of the AP Top 25 ranking for the first time since February 8, 2016. This marked the first time since December 25, 1961 that Duke, Kentucky and North Carolina were all out of the Top 25 ranking.

Ranking movements Legend: ██ Increase in ranking ██ Decrease in ranking — = Not ranked RV = Received votes ( ) = First-place votes
	Week																	
Poll	Pre	1	2	3	4	5	6	7	8	9	10	11	12	13	14	15	16	Final
AP	9	6	10	21	20	20	21	19	RV	—	—	—	—	—	—	—	—	Not released
Coaches	8 (1)	8 (1)^	11	23	25	RV	24	23	RV	—	—	—	—	—	—	—	—	—

^Coaches did not release a Week 1 poll.
