= DJ Steward =

American basketball player (born 2001)

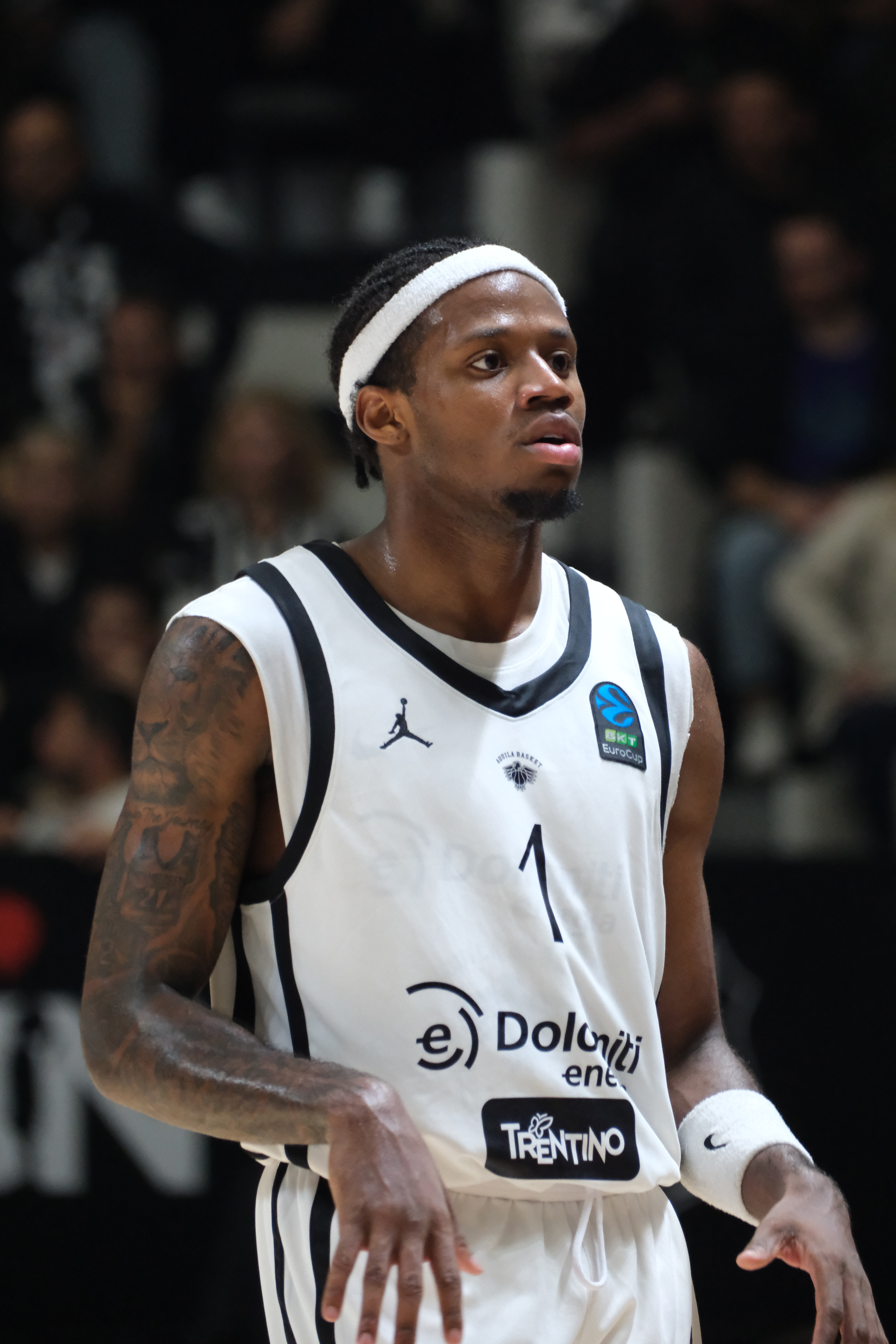
- Steward with Trento in 2025

No. 4 – San Pablo Burgos
- Position: Shooting guard
- League: Liga ACB; EuroCup

Personal information
- Born: October 2, 2001 (age 25) Chicago, Illinois, U.S.
- Listed height: 6 ft 2 in (1.88 m)
- Listed weight: 162 lb (73 kg)

Career information
- High school: Fenwick (Oak Park, Illinois); Whitney Young (Chicago, Illinois)
- College: Duke (2020–2021)
- NBA draft: 2021: undrafted
- Playing career: 2021–present

Career history
- 2021–2023: Stockton Kings
- 2023: Vancouver Bandits
- 2023–2024: Maine Celtics
- 2024: Windy City Bulls
- 2025: Memphis Hustle
- 2025–2026: Dolomiti Energia Trento
- 2026–present: San Pablo Burgos

Career highlights
- ACC All-Freshman Team (2021); McDonald's All-American (2020)
- Stats at NBA.com
- Stats at Basketball Reference

Danny Boy Steward (born October 2, 2001) is an American professional basketball player for San Pablo Burgos of the Liga ACB and the EuroCup. He played college basketball for the Duke Blue Devils. He was a consensus five-star recruit and one of the best shooting guards in the 2020 class. He finished his high school career at Whitney M. Young Magnet High School in Chicago, Illinois.

== High school career ==
Steward first attended Fenwick High School in Oak Park, Illinois. In 2018, he transferred to Whitney Young High School in Chicago, Illinois for his remaining years of high school. Steward averaged 24.1 points, 4.6 rebounds and 3.1 assists per game in the 2019 Nike EYBL circuit. In the Highland Shootout versus Christian Brothers College High School in January 2020, Steward scored a shootout-high 40 points including the game-tying bucket in a 66–64 victory. He was named a McDonald's All-American.

=== Recruiting ===
On September 18, 2019, Steward committed to play at Duke University. He chose the Blue Devils over offers from DePaul, Illinois, Indiana, Iowa State, Louisville, North Carolina and Texas.

College recruiting
Name	Hometown	School	Height	Weight	Commit date
DJ Steward; SG	Chicago, IL	Whitney Young (IL)	6 ft 3 in (1.91 m)	165 lb (75 kg)	Sep 18, 2019
DJ Steward; SG	Recruit ratings: Rivals: 247Sports: ESPN: (92)				
Overall recruit ranking: Rivals: 29 247Sports: 23 ESPN: 25
Note: In many cases, Scout, Rivals, 247Sports, On3, and ESPN may conflict in their listings of height and weight.; In these cases, the average was taken. ESPN grades are on a 100-point scale.; Sources: "Duke 2020 Basketball Commitments". Rivals.; "2020 Duke Blue Devils Recruiting Class". ESPN.; "2020 Team Ranking". Rivals.

== College career ==
Steward started 22 games and played in 24 games during Duke's 2020–21 season. A 6-foot-2-inch (1.88 m) combo guard, he averaged 13 points, 3.9 rebounds and 2.4 assists per game.

The Duke team finished that season 13–11, with a 9–9 record in the ACC. It was the first year since 1995 that the Blue Devils were not invited to the NCAA tournament.

While the season did not live up to Duke's usual expectations, Steward had multiple highlights during his only year on the team. In his college debut on November 28, 2020, Steward scored 24 points in an 81–71 win against Coppin State. On December 21, 2020, Steward was named Atlantic Coast Conference rookie of the week. On January 15, 2021, Steward scored 26 points and grabbed 6 rebounds in a 79–68 win over Wake Forest.

== Professional career ==
=== Stockton Kings (2021–2023) ===
After a very successful freshman season at Duke, Steward debated going professional. At 6 feet 2 inches (1.88 m), Steward was seen as having a shooting guard's skills in a point guard's body, and this led to a sense that he would need to develop point guard skills before he could effectively play in the NBA. Nevertheless, he decided to make himself available for the NBA draft.

After going undrafted in the 2021 NBA draft, Steward was invited to the Sacramento Kings for the 2021 NBA Summer League. On September 28, 2021, he signed a contract with the Kings. He was waived prior to the start of the season. Steward signed with the Stockton Kings of the NBA G League as an affiliate player for the 2021–22 season.

=== Vancouver Bandits (2023) ===
On April 6, 2023, Steward signed with the Vancouver Bandits of the Canadian Elite Basketball League. He was released by the Bandits on June 5 in order to prepare for the 2023 NBA Summer League, where he would play for the Philadelphia 76ers.

=== Maine Celtics (2023–2024) ===
On October 2, 2023, Steward signed with the Boston Celtics, but was waived on October 20. Eight days later, he joined the Maine Celtics.

=== Windy City Bulls (2024) ===
On July 21, 2024, Steward signed a two-way contract with the Chicago Bulls. However, he was waived on December 28, only playing for the Windy City Bulls.

=== Memphis Hustle (2025) ===
On January 6, 2025, Steward joined the Memphis Hustle.

=== Aquila Basket Trento (2025–2026) ===
On July 28, 2025, he signed with Dolomiti Energia Trento of the Italian Lega Basket Serie A (LBA).

=== San Pablo Burgos (2026–present) ===
On July 30, 2026, he signed with San Pablo Burgos of the Liga ACB and the EuroCup.

== Career statistics ==
Legend
GP	Games played	GS	Games started	MPG	Minutes per game
FG%	Field goal percentage	3P%	3-point field goal percentage	FT%	Free throw percentage
RPG	Rebounds per game	APG	Assists per game	SPG	Steals per game
BPG	Blocks per game	PPG	Points per game	**Bold**	Career high

=== College ===
Year	Team	GP	GS	MPG	FG%	3P%	FT%	RPG	APG	SPG	BPG	PPG
2020–21	Duke	24	22	30.8	.426	.341	.811	4.0	2.4	1.1	.6	13.0

== Personal life ==
Steward is the son of Katicha Jackson-Williams and Danny Boy Steward, and stepson of Tyrone Hill. He is named after his father, who was a former Death Row recording artist. He also played football in high school, and has a brother, Trent. Steward grew up in Oak Park, Illinois where he attended Brooks Middle School. He attended Fenwick his freshman and sophomore years, then transferred to Whitney Young for his last two years. He played travel ball since his middle school years with Meanstreets and played EYBL circuit, where he made an even bigger name for himself.
