= 2020–21 Florida State Seminoles men's basketball team =

American college basketball season

2020–21 Florida State Seminoles men's basketball

NCAA tournament, Sweet Sixteen
- Conference: Atlantic Coast Conference

Ranking
- Coaches: No. 10
- AP: No. 14
- Record: 18–7 (11–4 ACC)
- Head coach: Leonard Hamilton (19th season)
- Assistant coaches: Stan Jones; Charlton Young; Steve Smith
- Home arena: Donald L. Tucker Center

2020–21 ACC men's basketball standings
	Conf.				Overall
Team	W		L	PCT	W		L	PCT
No. 15 Virginia	13	–	4	.765	18	–	7	.720
No. 14 Florida State	11	–	4	.733	18	–	7	.720
No. 25 Virginia Tech	9	–	4	.692	15	–	7	.682
Georgia Tech †	11	–	6	.647	17	–	9	.654
Clemson	10	–	6	.625	16	–	8	.667
North Carolina	10	–	6	.625	18	–	11	.621
Louisville	8	–	5	.615	13	–	7	.650
Syracuse	9	–	7	.563	18	–	10	.643
NC State	9	–	8	.529	14	–	11	.560
Duke	9	–	9	.500	13	–	11	.542
Notre Dame	7	–	11	.389	11	–	15	.423
Pittsburgh	6	–	10	.375	10	–	12	.455
Miami (FL)	4	–	15	.211	10	–	17	.370
Wake Forest	3	–	15	.167	6	–	16	.273
Boston College	2	–	11	.154	4	–	16	.200
† 2021 ACC tournament winner Rankings from AP poll

The 2020–21 Florida State Seminoles men's basketball team represented Florida State University during the 2020–21 NCAA Division I men's basketball season. The Seminoles were led by head coach Leonard Hamilton, in his 19th year, and played their home games at the Donald L. Tucker Center on the university's Tallahassee, Florida campus as members of the Atlantic Coast Conference.

The Seminoles entered the year as the defending conference champions and were picked to finish the season third in the league with Scottie Barnes and M. J. Walker receiving pre-season recognition.

The Seminoles finished the season 18–7, and 11–4 in ACC play, to finish in second place. As the second seed in the ACC tournament they earned a bye into the Quarterfinals where they advanced due to COVID-19 issues over Duke, defeated North Carolina in the semifinals, but lost to Georgia Tech in the Finals. They earned an at-large bid to the NCAA tournament as a four seed in the East Region. They defeated 13-seed UNC Greensboro in the first round and 5-seed Colorado in the second round before losing to 1-seed Michigan in the Sweet Sixteen. Scottie Barnes, Balsa Koprivica, and RaiQuan Gray went on to be selected in the 2021 NBA draft.

== Previous season ==
The Seminoles finished the 2019–20 season with a record of 26–5, 16–4 in ACC play, to finish in first place. The ACC tournament was canceled prior to the team beginning play. The NCAA tournament was subsequently canceled as well due to the coronavirus pandemic. Florida State ended the season ranked in the top five of both polls. On March 14, 2020, the Florida State Senate declared the Florida State Seminoles as the national champions for the 2019–2020 season.

Patrick Williams, Devin Vassell, and Trent Forrest would go on to participate in the 2020 NBA draft.

== Offseason ==
=== Departures ===
Name	Number	Pos.	Height	Weight	Year	Hometown	Reason for departure
Trent Forrest	3	G	6'4"	210	Graduate Student	Chipley, FL	Graduated
Patrick Williams	4	F	6'8"	225	Freshman	Charlotte, NC	Declared for 2020 NBA draft; selected 4th overall by the Chicago Bulls
Dominik Olejniczak	15	C	7'0"	260	Graduate Student	Toruń, Poland	Graduated
Devin Vassell	24	G	6'7"	194	Sophomore	Suwanee, GA	Declared for 2020 NBA draft; selected 11th overall by the San Antonio Spurs
Ty Hands	44	G	6'5"	180	(redshirt) Freshman	Palm Beach Lakes, FL	—

=== Incoming transfers ===
Name	Number	Pos.	Height	Weight	Year	Hometown	Previous School
Tanor Ngom	34	C	7'2"	236	Senior	Dakar, Senegal	Transferred from Ryerson

=== 2020 recruiting class ===
College recruiting information
Name	Hometown	School	Height	Weight	Commit date
Scottie Barnes; PF	West Palm Beach, FL	Montverde Academy	6 ft 8 in (2.03 m)	210 lb (95 kg)	Oct 14, 2019
Scottie Barnes; PF	Recruit ratings: Scout: Rivals: 247Sports: ESPN:				
Sardaar Calhoun; SG	Tappahannock, VA	Missouri State University - West Plains	6 ft 6 in (1.98 m)	205 lb (93 kg)	Sep 10, 2019
Sardaar Calhoun; SG	Recruit ratings: Scout: Rivals: 247Sports: ESPN:				
Quincy Ballard; C	Syracuse, NY	Quality Education Academy	7 ft 0 in (2.13 m)	N/A	
Quincy Ballard; C	Recruit ratings: No ratings found				
Overall recruit ranking: Scout: N/A Rivals: N/A ESPN: N/A
Note: In many cases, Scout, Rivals, 247Sports, On3, and ESPN may conflict in their listings of height and weight.; In these cases, the average was taken. ESPN grades are on a 100-point scale.; Sources: "Florida State Seminoles". ESPN.; "2020 Team Ranking". Rivals.

== Roster ==
2020–21 Florida State Seminoles men's basketball team
Players
Coaches

Pos.	#	Name	Height	Weight	Year	Previous school	Hometown
G	0	RayQuan Evans	6 ft 4 in (1.93 m)	210 lb (95 kg)	Sr	Billings Skyview; North Idaho College	Billings, MT
F	1	RaiQuan Gray	6 ft 8 in (2.03 m)	260 lb (118 kg)	RS Jr	Dillard	Fort Lauderdale, FL
G	2	Anthony Polite	6 ft 6 in (1.98 m)	215 lb (98 kg)	RS Jr	St. Andrew's Christian	Lugano, Switzerland
G	4	Scottie Barnes	6 ft 9 in (2.06 m)	227 lb (103 kg)	Fr	Montverde Academy	West Palm Beach, FL
C	5	Balša Koprivica	7 ft 1 in (2.16 m)	240 lb (109 kg)	So	Montverde Academy	Belgrade, Serbia
F	10	Malik Osborne	6 ft 9 in (2.06 m)	225 lb (102 kg)	RS Jr	Don Bosco Prep; Rice	Matteson, IL
G	11	Nathanael Jack	6 ft 5 in (1.96 m)	195 lb (88 kg)	Sr	Calusa Prep; Eastern Florida State College	Mississauga, ON
G	12	Justin Lindner (W)	6 ft 1 in (1.85 m)	180 lb (82 kg)	RS Sr	Christian Brothers	Memphis, TN
C	15	Quincy Ballard	6 ft 11 in (2.11 m)	240 lb (109 kg)	Fr	Quality Education Academcy (N.C.)	Syracuse, NY
G	20	Travis Light (W)	6 ft 5 in (1.96 m)	180 lb (82 kg)	RS Sr	Montverde Academy	Vienna, VA
G	23	M. J. Walker (C)	6 ft 5 in (1.96 m)	213 lb (97 kg)	Sr	Jonesboro	Riverdale, GA
G	24	Sardaar Calhoun	6 ft 6 in (1.98 m)	220 lb (100 kg)	Jr	Blue Ridge School; Missouri State University–West Plains	Tappahannock, VA
F	30	Harrison Prieto (W)	6 ft 8 in (2.03 m)	230 lb (104 kg)	RS Sr	St. Paul's School	Mandeville, LA
G	31	Wyatt Wilkes	6 ft 8 in (2.03 m)	220 lb (100 kg)	RS Jr	Winter Park	Orlando, FL
G	33	Will Miles (W)	6 ft 6 in (1.98 m)	220 lb (100 kg)	RS Sr	Trinity Prep	Orlando, FL
C	34	Tanor Ngom	7 ft 2 in (2.18 m)	236 lb (107 kg)	Sr	Iqra Bilingual Academy; Ryerson	Dakar, Senegal
G	40	Isaac Spainhour (W)	6 ft 3 in (1.91 m)	160 lb (73 kg)	Fr	West Stokes	King, NC
G	42	Cleveland Yates (W)	6 ft 2 in (1.88 m)	214 lb (97 kg)	So	Briarcrest Christian School	Memphis, TN
G	44	Max Thorpe (W)	6 ft 3 in (1.91 m)	175 lb (79 kg)	Fr	Countryside	Clearwater, FL

Head coach

- Leonard Hamilton (UT Martin)

Assistant coach(es)

- Stan Jones (Memphis)
- Charlton Young (Georgia Southern)
- Steve Smith (Morgan State)

Legend

- (C) Team captain
- (S) Suspended
- (I) Ineligible
- (W) Walk-on
- Injured
- Current redshirt

Roster
Last update: November 18, 2020

== Schedule ==
Date time, TV	Rank^{#}	Opponent^{#}	Result	Record	High points	High rebounds	High assists	Site (attendance) city, state
Regular season
December 2, 2020*; 8:00 p.m., ACCN	No. 22	North Florida	W 86–58	1–0	17 – Walker	6 – Barnes	6 – Barnes	Donald L. Tucker Center (2,720); Tallahassee, FL
December 9, 2020*; 7:15 p.m., ESPN	No. 20	Indiana; ACC–Big Ten Challenge	W 69–67 ^{OT}	2–0	19 – Walker	19 – Tied	5 – Barnes	Donald L. Tucker Center (2,956); Tallahassee, FL
December 12, 2020*; 11:00 a.m., ESPNU	No. 20	Florida; Rivalry	W 83–71	3–0	17 – Tied	8 – Gray	5 – Barnes	Donald L. Tucker Center (2,761); Tallahassee, FL
December 15, 2020; 8:30 p.m., ACCN	No. 15	Georgia Tech	W 74–61	4–0 (1–0)	16 – Barnes	8 – Koprivica	3 – Tied	Donald L. Tucker Center (2,664); Tallahassee, FL
December 19, 2020; 9:00 p.m., ACCN	No. 15	UCF	L 74–86	4–1	22 – Walker	6 – Polite	3 – Barnes	Donald L. Tucker Center (2,576); Tallahassee, FL
December 21, 2020*; 8:00 p.m., ACCRSN	No. 21	Gardner-Webb	W 72–59	5–1	15 – Polite	9 – Polite	5 – Barnes	Donald L. Tucker Center (2,078); Tallahassee, FL
December 29, 2020; 7:00 p.m., ACCRSN	No. 18	at Clemson	L 67–77	5–2 (1–1)	14 – Barnes	9 – Koprivica	5 – Barnes	Littlejohn Coliseum (1,876); Clemson, SC
January 2, 2021; 6:00 p.m., ESPN2	No. 18	No. 20 Duke	Canceled due to COVID-19 issues					Donald L. Tucker Center; Tallahassee, FL
January 6, 2021; 7:00 p.m., ESPNU	No. 25	at Syracuse	Canceled due to COVID-19 issues					Carrier Dome; Syracuse, NY
January 13, 2021; 7:00 p.m., ESPN2		NC State	W 105–73	6–2 (2–1)	24 – Evans	6 – Evans	4 – Tied	Donald L. Tucker Center (2,837); Tallahassee, FL
January 16, 2021; 12:00 p.m., ESPN		North Carolina	W 82–75	7–2 (3–1)	21 – Walker	9 – Koprivica	5 – Gray	Donald L. Tucker Center (2,850); Tallahassee, FL
January 18, 2021; 7:00 p.m., ESPN		at Louisville	W 78–65	8–2 (4–1)	17 – Gray	8 – Gray	10 – Walker	KFC Yum! Center (3,024); Louisville, KY
January 23, 2021; 3:00 p.m., ABC		No. 20 Clemson	W 80–61	9–2 (5–1)	13 – Tied	10 – Koprivica	7 – Barnes	Donald L. Tucker Center (2,950); Tallahassee, FL
January 27, 2021; 6:00 p.m., ACCN	No. 16	Miami (FL)	W 81–59	10–2 (6–1)	11 – Tied	11 – Gray	4 – Tied	Donald L. Tucker Center (2,825); Tallahassee, FL
January 30, 2021; 4:00 p.m., ACCN	No. 16	at Georgia Tech	L 65–76	10–3 (6–2)	19 – Gray	8 – Gray	5 – Barnes	McCamish Pavilion (1,200); Atlanta, GA
February 2, 2021; 9:00 p.m., ACCN	No. 20	at Boston College	Canceled due to COVID-19 issues					Conte Forum; Chestnut Hill, MA
February 9, 2021; 8:30 p.m., ACCN	No. 17	at No. 18 Virginia Tech	Canceled due to COVID-19 issues					Cassell Coliseum; Blacksburg, VA
February 13, 2021; 12:00 p.m., ACCRSN	No. 17	Wake Forest	W 92–85 ^{OT}	11–3 (7–2)	24 – Gray	12 – Gray	5 – Walker	Donald L. Tucker Center (2,950); Tallahassee, FL
February 15, 2021; 7:00 p.m., ESPN	No. 16	No. 7 Virginia	W 81–60	12–3 (8–2)	17 – Walker	6 – Walker	6 – Barnes	Donald L. Tucker Center (2,950); Tallahassee, FL
February 20, 2021; 12:00 p.m., ACCN	No. 16	No. 18 Virginia Tech	Canceled due to COVID-19 issues					Donald L. Tucker Center; Tallahassee, FL
February 20, 2021; 4:00 p.m., ACCRSN	No. 16	at Pittsburgh	W 79–72	13–3 (9–2)	16 – Tied	9 – Osborne	4 – Polite	Petersen Events Center (500); Pittsburgh, PA
February 24, 2021; 8:30 p.m., ACCN	No. 11	at Miami (FL)	W 88–71	14–3 (10–2)	16 – Calhoun	13 – Gray	8 – Barnes	Watsco Center (0); Coral Gables, FL
February 27, 2021; 4:00 p.m., ESPN	No. 11	at North Carolina	L 70–78	14–4 (10–3)	17 – Gray	8 – Gray	2 – Gray	Dean E. Smith Center (0); Chapel Hill, NC
March 3, 2021; 9:00 p.m., ACCN	No. 11	Boston College	W 93–64	15–4 (11–3)	18 – Walker	6 – Tied	7 – Barnes	Donald L. Tucker Center (2,950); Tallahassee, FL
March 6, 2021; 12:00 p.m., ESPN2	No. 11	at Notre Dame	L 73–83	15–5 (11–4)	17 – Barnes	10 – Gray	2 – Tied	Purcell Pavilion (646); South Bend, IN
ACC tournament
March 11, 2021; 6:30 p.m., ESPN/ESPN2	(2) No. 15	vs. (10) Duke; Quarterfinals	Won by forfeit due to COVID-19 issues					Greensboro Coliseum; Greensboro, NC
March 12, 2021; 9:00 p.m., ESPN	(2) No. 15	vs. (6) North Carolina; Semifinals	W 69–66	16–5	17 – Koprivica	11 – Koprivica	4 – Barnes	Greensboro Coliseum (2,820); Greensboro, NC
March 13, 2021; 8:30 p.m., ESPN	(2) No. 15	vs. (4) Georgia Tech; Championship	L 75–80	16–6	21 – Barnes	10 – Koprivica	4 – Polite	Greensboro Coliseum (2,820); Greensboro, NC
NCAA tournament
March 20, 2021*; 12:45 p.m., truTV	(4 E) No. 14	vs. (13 E) UNC Greensboro; First Round	W 64–54	17–6	17 – Gray	9 – Koprivica	6 – Walker	Bankers Life Fieldhouse; Indianapolis, IN
March 22, 2021; 7:45 p.m., TBS	(4 E) No. 14	vs. (5 E) No. 22 Colorado; Second Round	W 71–53	18–6	22 – Polite	6 – Gray	5 – Barnes	Indiana Farmers Coliseum; Indianapolis, IN
March 28, 2021; 5:00 p.m., CBS	(4 E) No. 14	vs. (1 E) No. 4 Michigan; Sweet Sixteen	L 58–76	18–7	12 – Osborne	6 – Osborn	3 – Barnes	Bankers Life Fieldhouse; Indianapolis, IN
*Non-conference game. ^{#}Rankings from AP Poll. (#) Tournament seedings in parentheses. E=East. All times are in Eastern Time.

== Rankings ==
Ranking movements Legend: ██ Increase in ranking ██ Decrease in ranking RV = Received votes
	Week																	
Poll	Pre	1	2	3	4	5	6	7	8	9	10	11	12	13	14	15	16	Final
AP	21	22	20	15	21	18	25	RV	RV	16	20	17	16	11	11	15	14	Not released
Coaches	18	18*	21	15	21	19	22	RV	25	16	19	19	16	9	11	13	14	10

*Coaches did not release a Week 2 poll.

== Awards ==
- Ben Jobe Award
  - Leonard Hamilton
- Werner Ladder National Coach of the Year semifinalist
  - Leonard Hamilton

=== Watchlists ===
- Bob Cousy Award
  - Scottie Barnes
- Jerry West Award
  - M. J. Walker
- Naismith Trophy
  - Scottie Barnes

=== All-ACC ===
- Second Team
  - M.J. Walker
- Third Team
  - RaiQuan Gray
  - Scottie Barnes
- Freshman Team
  - Scottie Barnes
- ACC Sixth Man of the Year
  - Scottie Barnes
- ACC Freshman of the Year
  - Scottie Barnes
