= Scottie Barnes =

American basketball player (born 2001)

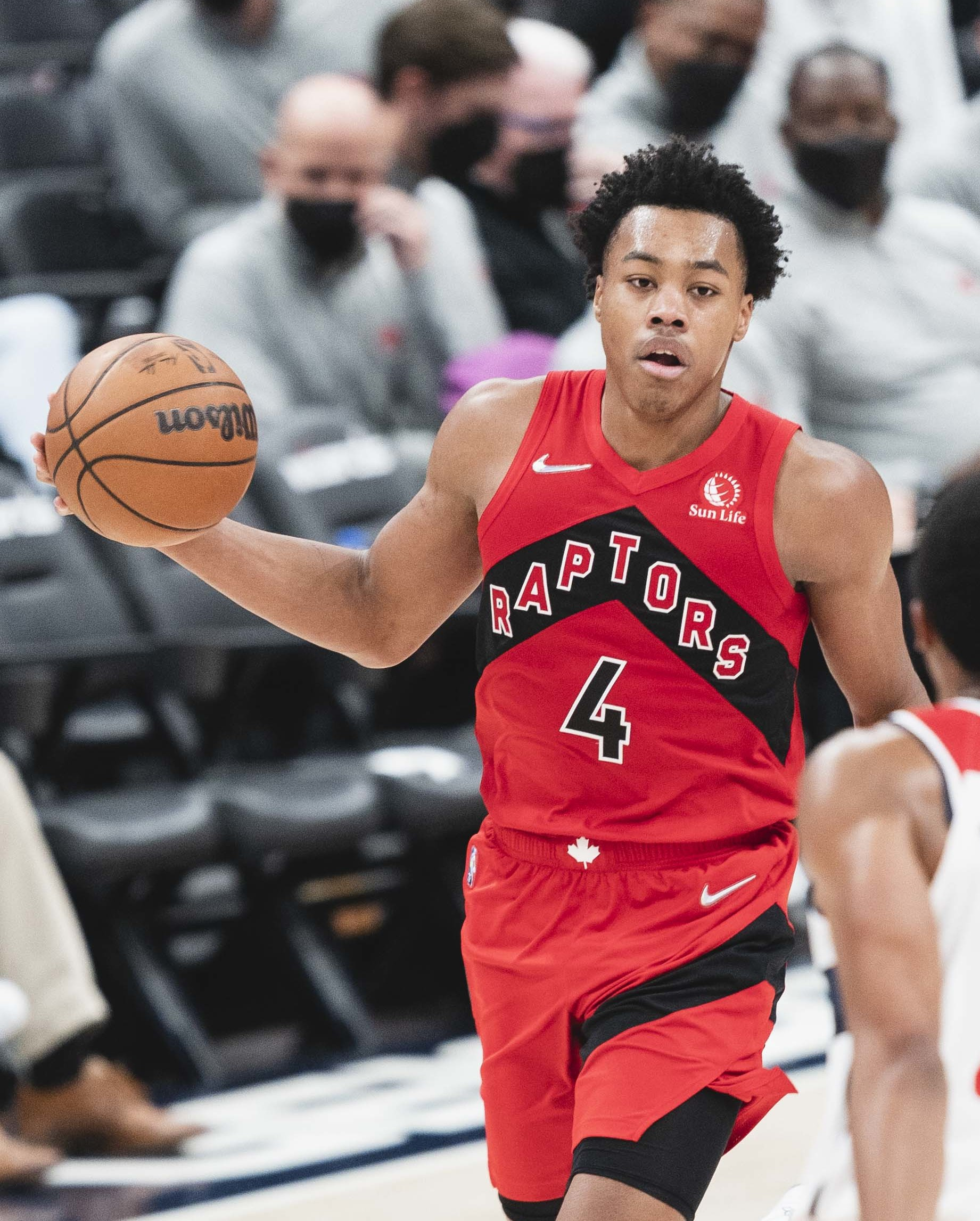
- Barnes with the Toronto Raptors in 2021

No. 4 – Toronto Raptors
- Position: Power forward / shooting guard
- League: NBA

Personal information
- Born: August 1, 2001 (age 25) West Palm Beach, Florida, U.S.
- Listed height: 6 ft 8 in (2.03 m)
- Listed weight: 237 lb (108 kg)

Career information
- High school: Cardinal Newman (West Palm Beach, Florida); NSU University School (Fort Lauderdale, Florida); Montverde Academy (Montverde, Florida)
- College: Florida State (2020–2021)
- NBA draft: 2021: 1st round, 4th overall pick
- Drafted by: Toronto Raptors
- Playing career: 2021–present

Career history
- 2021–present: Toronto Raptors

Career highlights
- 2× NBA All-Star (2024, 2026); NBA All-Defensive Second Team (2026); NBA Rookie of the Year (2022); NBA All-Rookie First Team (2022); Third-team All-ACC (2021); ACC Sixth Man of the Year (2021); ACC Rookie of the Year (2021); McDonald's All-American (2020)
- Stats at NBA.com
- Stats at Basketball Reference
Medals
Men's basketball
Representing the United States
FIBA Under-19 World Cup
Gold medal – first place	2019 Greece	Team
FIBA Under-17 World Cup
Gold medal – first place	2018 Argentina	Team
FIBA Americas U16 Championship
Gold medal – first place	2017 Argentina	Team

Scott Wayne Barnes Jr. (born August 1, 2001) is an American professional basketball player for the Toronto Raptors of the National Basketball Association (NBA). Widely regarded as one of the best defenders in the league, he is known for his versatility, shot-blocking, and playmaking.

Barnes attended Cardinal Newman High School in his hometown of West Palm Beach, Florida, before transferring to NSU University School. He later attended Montverde Academy, where he was rated a consensus five-star recruit and among the top players in the 2020 class by major recruiting services in his senior year. He played college basketball for the Florida State Seminoles and was named the conference rookie of the year in 2021.

Selected with the fourth overall pick by the Raptors in the 2021 NBA draft, Barnes was named the NBA Rookie of the Year in 2022. After a relatively disappointing second season, he had a breakout year in 2024, when he received his first All-Star selection and the Raptors pivoted to him as their franchise player. As the Raptors became competitive again after a rebuild, Barnes received his second All-Star selection and his first on an All-Defensive Team in 2026. He is regarded as a versatile player, capable of playmaking, ball-handling, and many defensive functions, although his jump shot has been an area of criticism.

== Early life ==
Barnes was born on August 1, 2001, in West Palm Beach, Florida, and was raised alongside three siblings by their mother Kathalyn Wilkins. Barnes described his upbringing as "pretty hard" as his family did not have stable housing and lived in troublesome neighborhoods. He began playing organized basketball in the third grade in a Salvation Army league, with a team composed mostly of fourth-graders. He also played pick-up at local gyms against opponents much older than him, who he credited for improving his perception and knowledge of the game.

As a fifth-grader Barnes caught the attention of Amateur Athletic Union (AAU) youth basketball coach John Simpson, who was invited to join his team, the Wellington Wolves. Simpson and his son Jason developed a close relationship with Barnes, who soon moved in with them in the affluent village of Wellington so he could reduce the burden on his mother. With Barnes, the Wolves went from what Simpson described as a purely casual team to participating in national tournaments. Already gifted in height, Barnes refined his athleticism and overall game with the Wolves, and by the end of seventh grade he was dominating his opponents.

== High school career ==
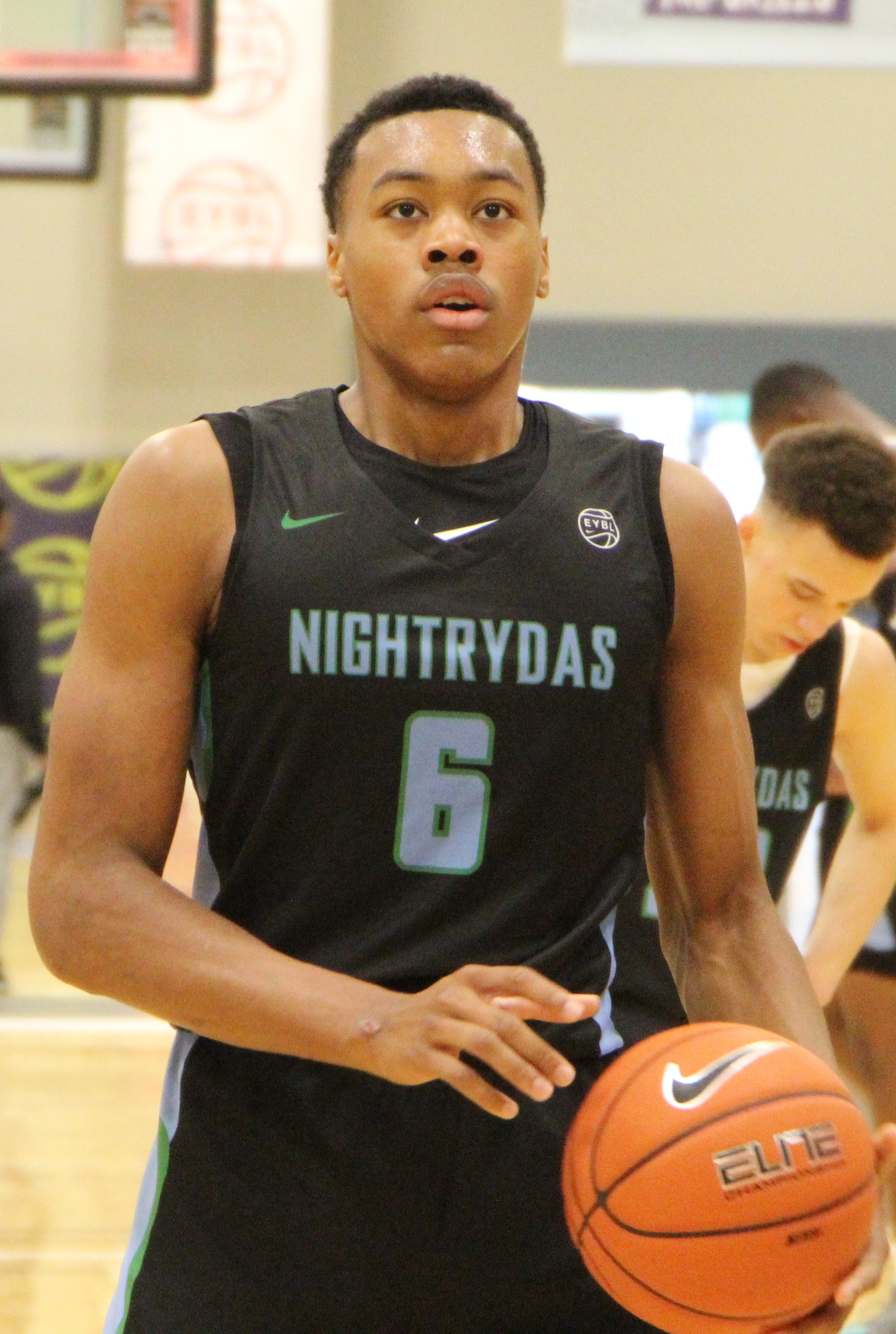
Barnes at the Nike EYBL in 2019

As a freshman in 2016, Barnes played basketball for Cardinal Newman High School in West Palm Beach. He earned All-Area second team and MaxPreps Freshman All-American honors after leading Newman to a 19–8 record and the 5A regional semifinals.

For his sophomore year Barnes transferred to NSU University School in Fort Lauderdale, where he was teammates with five-star prospect Vernon Carey Jr.. Barnes contributed to University School's 36–2 record and a Class 5A state title, averaging 15 points, eight rebounds and six assists per game. University School won a City of Palms Classic championship with Barnes being named the tournament's most valuable player (MVP). At GEICO Nationals, he averaged 21.3 points and 9.7 rebounds across the three games as University School surpassed expectations and reached the championship game, where they lost to Montverde Academy. In his junior season, Barnes averaged 14.5 points, 7.4 rebounds and 5.8 assists per game, him and Carey leading the team to a 27–5 record, a second straight 5A state title, and a second appearance at the GEICO Nationals championship game where they again lost to Montverde Academy.

After University School coach James Carr was fired, Barnes decided to transfer to a different school for his senior year. He was convinced by Cade Cunningham while at a USA under-17 camp to move to Montverde Academy, which he decided upon in August 2019. With Barnes, Cunningham and Day'Ron Sharpe among other prospects, many analysts regarded his team as one of the greatest in high school basketball history. Barnes averaged 11.6 points, 6.5 rebounds and 4.6 assists per game, contributing to Montverde's 25–0 record and 40-point average margin of victory. He received All-American first team honors from MaxPreps and Sports Illustrated, becoming one of the most highly-regarded high school prospects in the country. Barnes was selected to play in the McDonald's All-American Game, Jordan Brand Classic and Nike Hoop Summit, but all three games were canceled due to the COVID-19 pandemic.

=== Recruiting ===
A consensus five-star recruit, Barnes was considered the fourth-best player in the 2020 recruiting class by ESPN. He was the highest ranked power forward in his class by ESPN and Rivals. On October 14, 2019, Barnes announced his commitment to play college basketball for Florida State over offers from Kentucky, Miami (Florida) and Oregon, among others. His decision was labeled unusual compared to other prospects as the school was known for prioritizing deep rotations as opposed to letting stars display their prowess. Barnes himself said he "didn't really want to go to a school because of the name," and chose Florida State to participate in their aggressive defensive system.

College recruiting
Name	Hometown	School	Height	Weight	Commit date
Scottie Barnes; G / F	West Palm Beach, FL	Montverde Academy (FL)	6 ft 8 in (2.03 m)	240 lb (110 kg)	Oct 14, 2019
Scottie Barnes; G / F	Recruit ratings: Rivals: 247Sports: ESPN: (96)				
Overall recruit ranking: Rivals: 7 247Sports: 9 ESPN: 5
Note: In many cases, Scout, Rivals, 247Sports, On3, and ESPN may conflict in their listings of height and weight.; In these cases, the average was taken. ESPN grades are on a 100-point scale.; Sources: "Florida State 2020 Basketball Commitments". Rivals.; "2020 Florida State Seminoles Recruiting Class". ESPN.; "2020 Team Ranking". Rivals.

== College career ==
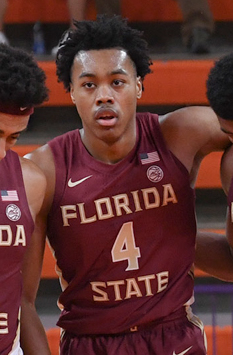
Barnes with the Seminoles in 2020

For the 2020–21 Florida State Seminoles men's basketball team, Barnes played the point guard position off the bench, quickly learning how to operate within the team's offense under head coach Leonard Hamilton. He served a versatile role on the defensive end, guarding players of all five positions. Barnes helped the Seminoles reach the ACC tournament championship game, in which he scored a career-high 21 points in an 80–75 loss to Georgia Tech, and the Sweet 16 of the NCAA tournament. As a freshman, he averaged 10.3 points, 4.1 assists, 4 rebounds and 1.5 steals per game, earning ACC Freshman of the Year, ACC Sixth Man of the Year and third-team All-ACC honors. On April 9, 2021, he declared for the 2021 NBA draft, forgoing his remaining college eligibility.

== Professional career ==
=== Toronto Raptors (2021–present) ===
==== Rookie of the Year (2021–22) ====
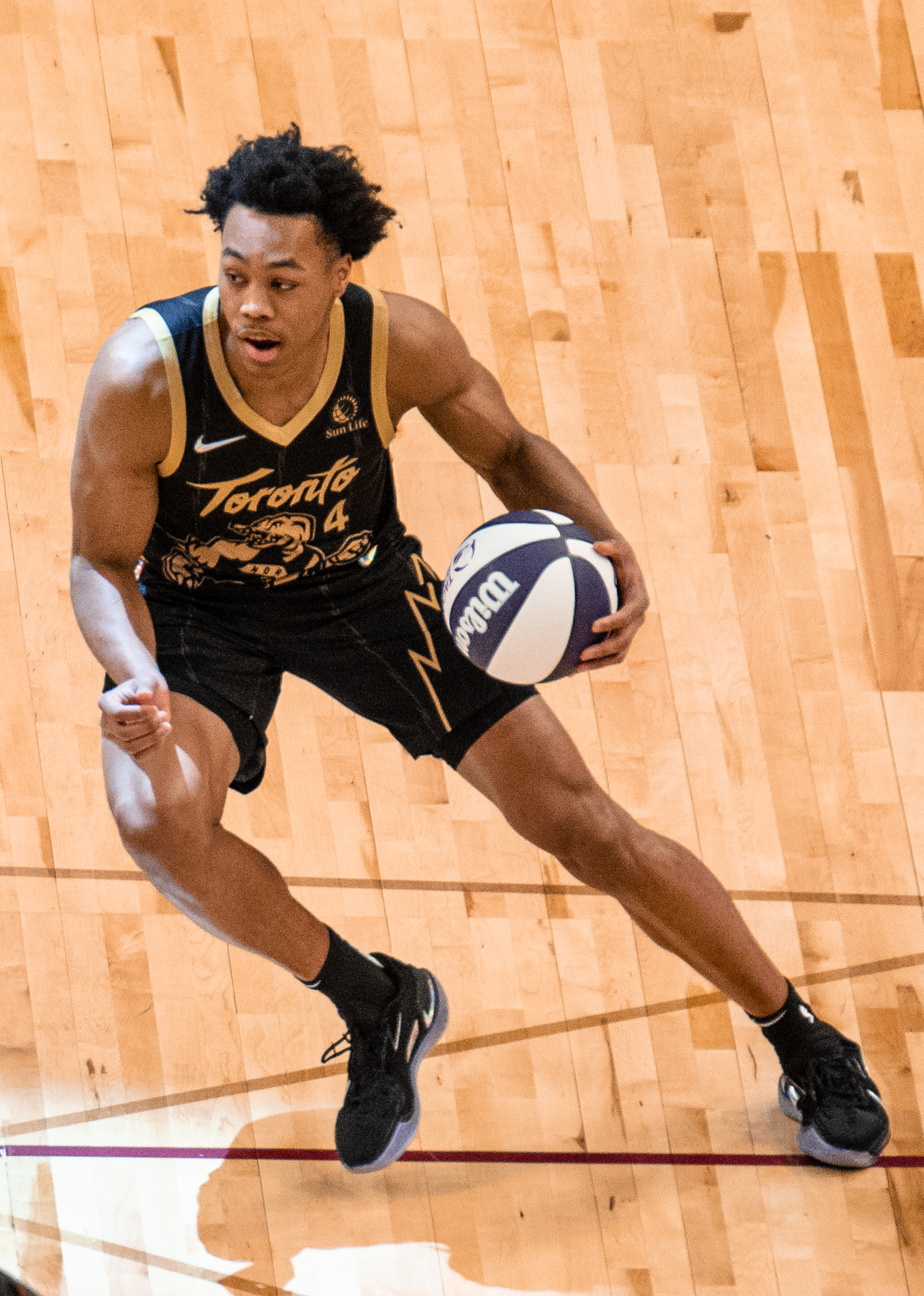
Barnes at the 2022 NBA All-Star Weekend Skills Challenge

The Toronto Raptors selected Barnes with the fourth overall pick of the 2021 NBA Draft. The selection was a surprise to many, as the consensus was the Raptors would select Gonzaga point guard Jalen Suggs. By the midpoint of the season, FiveThirtyEight reported that Barnes was exceeding expectations and proving to be an integral player for the Raptors. He was commonly assigned to defend against star players, meshed well offensively alongside Pascal Siakam and OG Anunoby, and took secondary ball-handling duties behind Fred VanVleet. He was generally the third-to-fourth offensive option behind the other starters. He was named to the 2022 Rising Stars Challenge, and earned Eastern Conference Rookie of the Month honours in February and March.

Playing a total of 74 games, Barnes finished the season averaging 15.3 points, 7.2 rebounds, 3.5 assists, 1.1 steals, and 0.7 blocks per game, and shot 49.2% from the field and 30.1% from three-point range. He ranked first among rookies in minutes per game and was the only rookie listed among the top five of all statistical categories. After a close race with Evan Mobley, Barnes was awarded the NBA Rookie of the Year, the first Raptor to receive the award since Vince Carter in 1999, and he was named to the NBA All-Rookie First Team.

Spurred by Barnes' impact, the Raptors exceeded expectations and finished as the fifth seed, facing the Philadelphia 76ers in the first round of the playoffs. Barnes suffered a sprained ankle in his playoff debut which forced him to miss the next two games. He averaged 12.8 points, 4.3 assists and 9.0 rebounds in the four playoff games he played as the Raptors were eliminated in six games.

==== Sophomore season (2022–23) ====
During his second season, Barnes received greater duties regarding playmaking, ball-handling and offence initiation. On November 4, 2022, he achieved his first career triple-double with 11 points, 11 rebounds, and 10 assists in a 111–110 loss to the Dallas Mavericks. He was named to the 2023 Rising Stars Challenge.

The Raptors were eliminated from playoff contention on April 12 in a play-in game against the Chicago Bulls. Barnes had 19 points and 10 rebounds in the 109–105 loss. He exhibited what media writers considered a sophomore slump as, compared to his rookie year, he averaged the same 15.3 points per game while his rebounds per game dropped from 7.5 to 6.0. His field goal percentage decreased from 49.2% to 45.6%, with notable declines in effectiveness for shots from "floater range" and jump shots from multiple ranges. His playmaking was an area of improvement, with his assists per game increasing from 3.5 to 4.8.

==== Breakthrough and first All-Star appearance (2023–24) ====
The off-season saw the departure of Raptors point guard Fred VanVleet and head coach Nick Nurse. Barnes was more involved in ball-handling and playmaking under new head coach Darko Rajaković. He scored 20 or more points six times during the first seven games—it took him 30 games to do so the previous season. His strong start was underscored in a 123–116 comeback victory against the San Antonio Spurs on November 5, 2023, during which he recorded 30 points with five completed three-pointers, 11 rebounds, six assists, three steals and three blocks.

The Raptors traded OG Anunoby and Pascal Siakam by mid-season, which cemented Barnes as the franchise cornerstone. General manager Masai Ujiri said Barnes' breakthrough year was a motivator for the team to make the trades. Barnes was named as an injury replacement player for Joel Embiid for the 2024 NBA All-Star Game, which was his first All-Star selection. During the last 20 games of the season, he was the runner-up leader for the Raptors in average points and rebounds, and led in assists, blocks and steals. During a 130–122 win against the Indiana Pacers on February 26, 2024, he recorded his fourth triple-double of the season with 21 points, 12 rebounds and 12 assists, setting a franchise record for the most triple-doubles in a season.

During a game against the Golden State Warriors on March 1, Barnes suffered a broken metacarpal bone in his left hand. The injury led him to miss the final 22 games of the season, during which the Raptors were eliminated from playoff contention. In the 60 games he played during the season, Barnes averaged 19.9 points, 8.2 rebounds and 6.1 assists, all career-highs. He led the Raptors in total points, rebounds, assists and blocks, and was one of two players in the league to average at least 1.0 in all statistical categories. His three-point shooting improved to 34.1% on nearly five attempts per game.

==== Franchise player and contract extension (2024–25) ====
On July 8, 2024, Barnes signed a $225 million, 5-year contract extension with the Raptors worth up to $270 million if he met the requirements for a "supermax" contract. The extension made him the highest-paid player in franchise history. In what was termed a rebuilding year for the Raptors, Barnes was encouraged to prioritize his development. He operated as the primary mid-range player for the Raptors, taking the majority of his shots from that area.

Four games into the season on October 28, Barnes suffered a right orbital bone fracture during a game against the Denver Nuggets. He missed 11 games, during which the Raptors went 2–9, before returning on November 21 and assuming the point guard position. On December 3, he put up a then career-high 35 points along with nine rebounds and six assists in a 122–111 win over the Pacers. He was averaging 20.6 points, 8.4 rebounds and 7.4 assists until suffering a right ankle sprain during a game against the New York Knicks on December 9, sidelining him again for 10 days. He received Eastern Conference Player of the Week honours in January 2025. In the final game of the season on April 13, Barnes tied his then career-high with 35 points, along with 11 rebounds and 8 assists in a 125–118 loss to the San Antonio Spurs.

The tanking Raptors missed the postseason again. Barnes' season was relatively stagnant in terms of development—in 65 total games, he averaged 19.3 points, 7.7 rebounds, 5.8 assists, 1.4 steals and 1.0 blocks. He shot career-worsts from the three-point line and certain areas of the mid-range. Barnes blamed a hand injury aggravated on March 7 for hindering his shot from then onwards, but his shooting splits from both before and after the incident were seen as relatively poor. Regardless, media writers noted that Barnes exhibited development on the defensive and offensive end and showed growth as a leader.

==== First All-Defensive Team selection (2025–26) ====
The Raptors acquired star forward Brandon Ingram at the previous season's trade deadline, but he was sidelined with an injury. Barnes settled into the position of a number-two offensive option during Ingram's debut season in Toronto. With Ingram operating as the mid-range specialist, Barnes had a more complimentary shot diet and was thus more efficient offensively. He continued his upward trajectory on the defensive end, being named Eastern Conference Defensive Player of the Month for October and November 2025.

On December 28, Barnes had 23 points, a career-high and franchise record-tying 25 rebounds, and 10 assists in a 141–127 overtime victory against the Golden State Warriors. It was the first 20–20 triple-double in Raptors history and the second 20–25–10 game recorded by an NBA player in the last 40 years. Barnes was named Eastern Conference Player of the Week in January 2026, and later a reserve player for the 2026 NBA All-Star Game in his second career selection. Through an eight game stretch in March, Barnes assumed the role of de facto point guard with starter Immanuel Quickley injured, averaging 10.6 assists. He recorded a career-high 15 assists along with 23 points in a 139–87 victory over the Orlando Magic on March 29. His 18 points, 12 rebounds and 12 assists in the 136–101 season finale victory against the Brooklyn Nets made him the first player in franchise history to record at least three triple-doubles in multiple seasons.

Barnes finished the regular season having played a career-high 80 games, and averaged 18.1 points, 7.5 rebounds, 5.9 assists, 1.5 blocks and 1.4 steals. He shot a career-high 51% from the field, and improved his free throw shooting to 81.5%. His 230 "stocks" (total steals and blocks) were the second most in the league behind Victor Wembanyama, and he was the first player in seven seasons to accumulate at least 100 steals and 100 blocks. He also led the league in clutch blocks with nine. He earned his first career selection on the NBA All-Defensive Second Team, the third Raptor to ever be named to one.

The Raptors faced the Cleveland Cavaliers during the first round of the 2026 playoffs. Barnes had a playoff career-high 33 points and 11 assists to contribute to a 126–104 victory in Game 3. Despite the Raptors ultimately losing in seven games, Barnes was generally considered the best-performing player across both teams, solidifying his future as the franchise cornerstone. He averaged 24.1 points, 8.6 assists, 6.1 rebounds and 1.7 blocks, taking on a more aggressive role offensively and serving as a makeshift point guard with Quickley and Ingram injured. He also fulfilled several defensive roles, effectively guarding Cavaliers stars Donovan Mitchell and James Harden while protecting the post.

==== 2026–27 ====
On October 30, 2026, Barnes put up a career-high 41 points, along with five rebounds, five assists, and two steals in a 121–114 loss to the Orlando Magic.

== National team career ==
Barnes won a gold medal with the United States at the 2017 FIBA Under-16 Americas Championship in Formosa, Argentina after averaging 9.8 points, 3.2 rebounds and 2.4 steals per game. In a semifinal win over Argentina, he led all scorers with 20 points and six steals while breaking the American under-16 record for free throw percentage by shooting 8-of-8 from the free throw line. At the 2018 FIBA Under-17 World Cup in Argentina, Barnes averaged 9.5 points and 5.8 rebounds per game and captured another gold medal. He averaged 9.7 points, 4.9 rebounds and 2.7 assists per game at the 2019 FIBA Under-19 World Cup in Heraklion, Greece, where he won his third gold medal with the United States. As of 2025, Barnes has yet to play on the international level with a senior team, but has shown interest in representing Jamaica.

== Player profile ==
Listed as 6 ft 8 in (2.03 m) and 237 lb (108 kg), with a wingspan of 7 ft 3 in (2.21 m), Barnes is officially listed as a power forward but often plays the role of a point forward. He has played all five positions for extended amounts of time, including dedicated point guard and center. Raptors general manager Masai Ujiri described him as positionless and "one of those players of the future."

There's definitely a lot of 'Showtime' in him... He can do everything on the basketball court much like myself. He's big. He's strong. He's physical. He can make his teammates better like I was able to do and he's a matchup nightmare like I was.

— Magic Johnson on Barnes in 2022, Toronto Star

Barnes is described as possessing a rare combination of size, court vision, pace and physicality. He has been noted for his strength and size relative to his point guard capability. He is a difficult matchup for opposing teams, and is recognized for his playmaking skills such as court vision, passing, open-court ball handling, and ability to organize and initiate an offense, acting as a "playmaking hub" for his team mates. For these reasons he has elicited comparisons to Magic Johnson, including that from Johnson himself. Barnes is particularly effective in transition and often looks to push the pace. His strong suit is in attacking the paint, where he can overpower defenders and score around the rim or collapse the defense and dish out assists for teammates. In this regard he has been compared to Giannis Antetokounmpo.

Regarded as a defense-oriented star and one of the most versatile defenders in the NBA, Barnes is capable of guarding players of all five positions and of various skill sets, often being assigned to the best offensive player of the opposing team indiscriminately. He can provide rim protection, off-ball defense and one-on-one perimeter guarding, and can easily shift between roles. While capable of many assignments, Barnes is most impactful off-ball as a roamer who can provide help defense and disrupt offensive sets with anticipative plays.

In the scoring department, Barnes had been described as "relatively limited" and "not a natural scorer". Weak three-point shooting and an inconsistent jump shot are considered his biggest weaknesses. He shot only 30% from three-point range through his first five seasons in the NBA. Regarding his shooting form, Steven Loung of Sportsnet wrote in 2021: "He's very stilted between the transfer of crouching down to going up with the ball, his elbow is looks to drift to the side and his release is pretty slow." Without reliability in either aspect, Sports Illustrated suggested Barnes is better suited as a secondary scoring option on a team rather than the leader.

To develop his shot, Barnes doubled his mid-range field goal attempts during the 2024–25 season and showed "emerging outlines of a go-to jumper in the mid-range". He improved his mid-range shooting by the 2025–26 season in his best career shooting year thus far, although this was also attributed to a more efficient shot diet.

== Personal life ==
Barnes' father, Scott Barnes Sr., is Jamaican, and many of his relatives are Canadian. In September 2024, he and his partner, Alyssa Rae Holmes, announced they had welcomed a daughter.

Outside of basketball, Barnes is an avid gamer: his favourite video games are the NBA 2K franchise. He often livestreams himself playing the games on Twitch. He also enjoys theatre, particularly the musical Hamilton, viewing it in Broadway whenever he visits New York City. He became a fan of theatre in 2023 after viewing Hamilton on the suggestion of Toronto Raptors assistant coach Jama Mahlalela. Since then he has viewed many plays and musicals. He and teammate Jamal Shead appeared in a National Ballet of Canada production of "The Nutcracker" in Toronto on December 19, 2025, in non-dancing cameo roles.

== Career statistics ==
Legend
GP	Games played	GS	Games started	MPG	Minutes per game
FG%	Field goal percentage	3P%	3-point field goal percentage	FT%	Free throw percentage
RPG	Rebounds per game	APG	Assists per game	SPG	Steals per game
BPG	Blocks per game	PPG	Points per game	**Bold**	Career high

=== NBA ===
==== Regular season ====
Year	Team	GP	GS	MPG	FG%	3P%	FT%	RPG	APG	SPG	BPG	PPG
2021–22	Toronto	74	74	**35.4**	.492	.301	.735	7.5	3.5	1.1	.7	15.3
2022–23	Toronto	77	76	34.8	.456	.281	.772	6.7	4.8	1.1	.8	15.3
2023–24	Toronto	60	60	34.9	.475	**.341**	.781	**8.2**	**6.1**	1.3	**1.5**	**19.9**
2024–25	Toronto	65	65	32.8	.446	.271	.755	7.7	5.8	**1.4**	1.0	19.3
2025–26	Toronto	**80**	**80**	33.5	**.507**	.304	**.815**	7.5	5.9	**1.4**	**1.5**	18.1
Career		356	355	34.3	.475	.301	.773	7.5	5.2	1.3	1.1	17.4
All-Star		2	0	19.5	.750	.420	—	9.0	3.5	1.5	.5	13.5

==== Playoffs ====
Year	Team	GP	GS	MPG	FG%	3P%	FT%	RPG	APG	SPG	BPG	PPG
2022	Toronto	4	3	33.3	.429	.167	**.813**	**9.0**	4.3	1.0	.3	12.8
2026	Toronto	**7**	**7**	**39.0**	**.509**	**.381**	.796	6.1	**8.6**	**1.1**	**1.7**	**24.1**
Career		11	10	36.9	.487	.303	.800	7.2	7.0	1.1	1.2	20.0

=== College ===
Year	Team	GP	GS	MPG	FG%	3P%	FT%	RPG	APG	SPG	BPG	PPG
2020–21	Florida State	24	7	24.8	.503	.275	.621	4.0	4.1	1.5	.5	10.3
