= Jaemyn Brakefield =

American basketball player (born 2000)

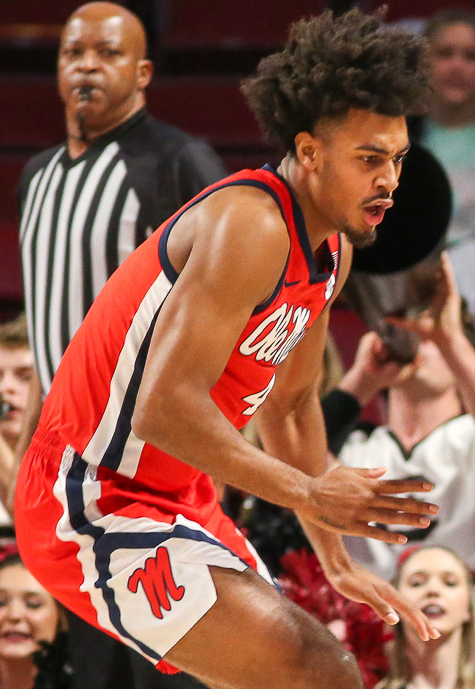
- Brakefield with Ole Miss in 2023

Personal information
- Born: December 19, 2000 (age 25) Jackson, Mississippi, U.S.
- Listed height: 6 ft 8 in (2.03 m)
- Listed weight: 225 lb (102 kg)

Career information
- High school: Huntington Prep (Huntington, West Virginia)
- College: Duke (2020–2021); Ole Miss (2021–2025)
- NBA draft: 2025: undrafted
- Position: Power forward

Jaemyn Mikal Brakefield (born December 19, 2000) is an American college basketball player for the Ole Miss Rebels of the Southeastern Conference (SEC). He previously played for the Duke Blue Devils.

== High school career ==
Brakefield played at Huntington Prep School in Huntington, West Virginia for four years.

=== Recruiting ===
On October 4, 2019, Brakefield committed to play at Duke University.

Brakefield was rated as a consensus four-star recruit and ranked No. 31 overall recruit and No. 4 overall power forward in the 2020 high school class.

College recruiting
| Name | Hometown | School | Height | Weight | Commit date |
|---|---|---|---|---|---|
| Jaemyn Brakefield; PF | Jackson, MS | Huntington Prep (WV) | 6 ft 8 in (2.03 m) | 215 lb (98 kg) | Oct 18, 2019 |
| Jaemyn Brakefield; PF | Recruit ratings: Rivals: 247Sports: ESPN: (89) | | | | |
Overall recruit ranking: Rivals: 42 247Sports: 51 ESPN: 31
Note: In many cases, Scout, Rivals, 247Sports, On3, and ESPN may conflict in their listings of height and weight.; In these cases, the average was taken. ESPN grades are on a 100-point scale.; Sources: "Duke 2020 Basketball Commitments". Rivals.; "2020 Duke Blue Devils Recruiting Class". ESPN.; "2020 Team Ranking". Rivals.

== College career ==
Brakefield played for the Duke Blue Devils during the 2020–21 season. He averaged a disappointing 3.5 points, and 2.5 rebounds per game while shooting 40.8 percent from the floor. After the season he announced his decision to enter the transfer portal. On April 21, 2021, Brakefield decided to transfer to Ole Miss. He averaged 7.7 points, and 4.2 rebounds per game as a sophomore.

== Career statistics ==
Legend
| GP | Games played | GS | Games started | MPG | Minutes per game |
| FG% | Field goal percentage | 3P% | 3-point field goal percentage | FT% | Free throw percentage |
| RPG | Rebounds per game | APG | Assists per game | SPG | Steals per game |
| BPG | Blocks per game | PPG | Points per game | **Bold** | Career high |

=== College ===
| Year | Team | GP | GS | MPG | FG% | 3P% | FT% | RPG | APG | SPG | BPG | PPG |
|---|---|---|---|---|---|---|---|---|---|---|---|---|
| 2020–21 | Duke | 22 | 2 | 12.5 | .408 | .314 | .417 | 2.5 | .5 | .4 | .4 | 3.5 |
| 2021–22 | Ole Miss | 32 | 25 | 25.3 | .471 | **.373** | .686 | 4.2 | .8 | .7 | .2 | 7.7 |
| 2022–23 | Ole Miss | **33** | 31 | 29.0 | **.537** | .351 | .734 | **5.7** | 1.7 | .7 | .2 | 11.1 |
| 2023–24 | Ole Miss | 32 | **32** | **29.4** | .477 | .362 | **.765** | 4.9 | **2.4** | **.8** | **.5** | **12.9** |
| Career | | 119 | 90 | 25.1 | .487 | .356 | .727 | 4.5 | 1.4 | .7 | .3 | 9.3 |

== Personal life ==
Brakefield is the son of Pamela Root and James Brakefield. He has four brothers – Jake Root, Andrew Knaack, Jamal Brakefield and Daimen Brakefield – and two sisters – Kristen Nickole and Jennifer Fleming.
