= 2020–21 NCAA Division I men's basketball rankings =

- Season: 2020–21
- NCAA Tournament: 2021
- Preseason No. 1: Gonzaga
- NCAA Tournament Champions: Baylor
NCAA Division I men's basketball rankings


Two human polls made up the 2020–21 NCAA Division I men's basketball rankings, the AP Poll and the Coaches Poll, in addition to various publications' preseason polls.

With the release of the poll on November 30, Kansas was ranked in the AP poll for the 223rd consecutive week, breaking the record set by UCLA from 1966 to 1980. Nine weeks later, with the release of the poll on February 8, the streak that began with the February 2, 2009 poll would end at 232.

== Legend ==
	Increase in ranking
	Decrease in ranking
	New to rankings from previous week
Italics	Number of first-place votes
(#–#)	Win–loss record
т	Tied with team above or below also with this symbol

== AP Poll ==
	Preseason Nov 9	Week 2 Nov 30	Week 3 Dec 7	Week 4 Dec 14	Week 5 Dec 21	Week 6 Dec 28	Week 7 Jan 4	Week 8 Jan 11	Week 9 Jan 18	Week 10 Jan 25	Week 11 Feb 1	Week 12 Feb 8	Week 13 Feb 15	Week 14 Feb 22	Week 15 Mar 1	Week 16 Mar 8	Final Mar 15	
1.	Gonzaga (28)	Gonzaga (2–0) (57)	Gonzaga (3–0) (54)	Gonzaga (3–0) (54)	Gonzaga (4–0) (61)	Gonzaga (7–0) (62)	Gonzaga (10–0) (63)	Gonzaga (12–0) (63)	Gonzaga (14–0) (62)	Gonzaga (15–0) (62)	Gonzaga (17–0) (61)	Gonzaga (18–0) (55)	Gonzaga (20–0) (59)	Gonzaga (22–0) (60)	Gonzaga (24–0) (59)	Gonzaga (24–0) (61)	Gonzaga (26–0) (60)	1.
2.	Baylor (24)	Baylor (2–0) (6)	Baylor (3–0) (7)	Baylor (4–0) (7)	Baylor (5–0) (3)	Baylor (6–0) (2)	Baylor (9–0) (1)	Baylor (11–0) (1)	Baylor (12–0) (2)	Baylor (14–0) (2)	Baylor (16–0) (3)	Baylor (17–0) (8)	Baylor (17–0) (5)	Baylor (17–0) (4)	Michigan (18–1) (4)	Baylor (21–1) (2)	Illinois (23–6)	2.
3.	Villanova (11)	Iowa (2–0)	Iowa (3–0)	Iowa (6–0) (1)	Kansas (7–1)	Kansas (8–1)	Villanova (8–1)	Villanova (8–1)	Villanova (8–1)	Villanova (10–1)	Villanova (11–1)	Michigan (13–1)	Michigan (14–1)	Michigan (16–1)	Baylor (18–1)	Illinois (20–6)	Baylor (22–2)	3.
4.	Virginia (1)	Wisconsin (2–0)	Michigan State (5–0)	Michigan State (6–0)	Iowa (6–1)	Villanova (8–1)	Texas (8–1)	Texas (10–1)	Iowa (12–2)	Michigan (13–1)	Michigan (13–1)	Ohio State (15–4)	Ohio State (17–4)	Ohio State (18–5)	Illinois (18–6)	Michigan (19–3)	Michigan (20–4)	4.
5.	Iowa	Illinois (3–0)	Kansas (4–1)	Kansas (6–1)	Villanova (7–1)	Houston (7–0)	Iowa (9–2)	Iowa (11–2)	Texas (11–2)	Texas (11–2)	Houston (15–1)	Villanova (12–2)	Illinois (14–5)	Illinois (16–5)	Iowa (18–7)	Iowa (20–7)	Alabama (24–6)	5.
6.	Kansas	Duke (1–0)	Illinois (3–1)	Houston (4–0)	Houston (5–0)	Wisconsin (8–1)	Kansas (8–2)	Kansas (10–2)	Tennessee (10–1)	Houston (13–1)	Texas (11–3)	Illinois (13–5)	Houston (17–2)	Alabama (18–5)	West Virginia (17–6)	Alabama (21–6)	Houston (24–3)	6.
7.	Wisconsin	Kansas (1–1)	Houston (4–0)	Villanova (5–1)	West Virginia (7–1)	Tennessee (6–0)	Creighton (8–2)	Michigan (10–0)	Michigan (11–1)	Iowa (12–3)	Ohio State (14–4)	Texas Tech (14–5)	Virginia (15–3)	Oklahoma (14–5)	Ohio State (18–7)	Houston (21–3)	Ohio State (21–9)	7.
8.	Illinois	Michigan State (2–0)	Creighton (3–0)	West Virginia (6–1)	Tennessee (4–0)	Texas (7–1)	Wisconsin (9–2)	Creighton (10–2)	Houston (11–1)	Virginia (10–2)	Iowa (12–4)	Houston (16–2)	Alabama (17–5)	Villanova (14–3)	Alabama (19–6)	Arkansas (21–5)	Iowa (21–8)	8.
9.	Duke	Creighton (1–0)	Villanova (4–1)	Creighton (4–1)	Wisconsin (6–1)	West Virginia (7–2)	Tennessee (7–1)	Wisconsin (10–2)	Kansas (10–3)	Alabama (13–3)	Oklahoma (11–4)	Virginia (13–3)	Oklahoma (13–5)	Iowa (17–6)	Houston (20–3)	Ohio State (18–8)	Texas (19–7)	9.
10.	Kentucky	Houston (3–0)	Duke (2–1)	Tennessee (2–0)	Texas (7–1)	Iowa (7–2)	Michigan (9–0)	Tennessee (9–1)	Wisconsin (11–3)	Texas Tech (11–4)	Alabama (14–4)	Missouri (13–3)	Villanova (13–3)	West Virginia (15–6)	Villanova (15–4)	West Virginia (18–8)	Arkansas (22–6)	10.
11.	Creighton	West Virginia (3–0)	West Virginia (4–1)	Texas (5–1)	Rutgers (6–0)	Creighton (7–2)	Houston (8–1)	Houston (10–1)	Creighton (10–3)	West Virginia (10–4)	Tennessee (12–3)	Alabama (15–5)	Iowa (15–6)	Florida State (13–3)	Florida State (14–4)	Kansas (19–8)	Oklahoma State (20–8)	11.
12.	Tennessee	Villanova (2–1)	Tennessee (0–0)	Wisconsin (4–1)	Michigan State (6–1)	Missouri (6–0)	Illinois (8–3)	Clemson (9–1)	Texas Tech (11–4)	Missouri (10–2)	Illinois (11–5)	Oklahoma (12–5)	Texas (13–5)	Houston (18–3)	Arkansas (19–5)	Oklahoma State (18–7)	Kansas (20–8)	12.
13.	Michigan State	Tennessee (0–0)	Wisconsin (3–1) т	Illinois (4–2)	Creighton (6–2)	Texas Tech (7–2)	Missouri (7–1)	West Virginia (9–4)	Virginia (9–2)	Ohio State (12–4)	Texas Tech (12–5)	Texas (11–5)	West Virginia (14–6)	Creighton (16–5)	Kansas (18–8)	Texas (17–7)	West Virginia (18–9)	13.
14.	Texas Tech	North Carolina (1–0)	Texas (4–1) т	Texas Tech (6–1)	Missouri (5–0)	Rutgers (6–1)	West Virginia (8–3)	Illinois (9–4)	West Virginia (9–4)	Wisconsin (12–4)	Virginia (11–3)	West Virginia (13–5)	Creighton (16–5)	Texas (13–6)	Creighton (17–6)	Villanova (16–5)	Florida State (16–6)	14.
15.	West Virginia	Virginia (1–1)	Virginia Tech (4–0)	Florida State (3–0)	Texas Tech (6–2)	Illinois (7–3)	Rutgers (7–2)	Texas Tech (10–3)	Ohio State (11–3)	Kansas (10–5)	Creighton (13–4)	Iowa (13–6)	Texas Tech (14–6)	Virginia (15–5)	Texas (14–7)	Florida State (15–5)	Virginia (18–6)	15.
16.	North Carolina	Virginia Tech (3–0)	North Carolina (3–1)	Missouri (5–0)	Virginia (3–1)	Michigan (7–0)	Minnesota (10–2)	Louisville (8–1)	Virginia Tech (11–2)	Florida State (9–2)	Virginia Tech (13–3)	Tennessee (13–4)	Florida State (11–3)	Virginia Tech (14–4)	Oklahoma (14–7)	Virginia (17–6)	San Diego State (23–4)	16.
17.	Houston	Texas Tech (2–1) т	Texas Tech (4–1)	Virginia (3–1)	North Carolina (5–2)	Michigan State (6–2)	Oregon (8–1)	Missouri (7–2)	Minnesota (11–4)	Creighton (11–4)	West Virginia (11–5)	Florida State (10–3)	USC (17–3)	Kansas (17–7)	Oklahoma State (16–6)	Creighton (18–7)	Loyola–Chicago (24–4)	17.
18.	Arizona State	Texas (1–0) т	Virginia (3–1)	San Diego State (5–0)	Illinois (5–3)	Florida State (5–1)	Texas Tech (8–3)	Virginia (7–2)	Alabama (11–3)	Tennessee (10–3)	Missouri (11–3)	Virginia Tech (14–4)	Virginia Tech (14–4)	Texas Tech (14–7)	Texas Tech (15–8)	Loyola–Chicago (24–4)	Villanova (16–6)	18.
19.	Texas	Richmond (2–0)	Richmond (2–0)	Rutgers (4–0)	Michigan (6–0)	Northwestern (6–1)	Virginia Tech (8–1)	Duke (5–2)	Missouri (8–2)	Illinois (10–5)	Wisconsin (13–5)	Creighton (14–5)	Tennessee (14–5)	USC (18–4)	San Diego State (19–4)	San Diego State (20–4)	Creighton (20–8)	19.
20.	Oregon	Kentucky (1–1)	Florida State (1–0)	Ohio State (5–0)	Duke (3–2)	Duke (3–2)	Clemson (8–1)	Virginia Tech (9–2)	Clemson (9–2)	Virginia Tech (11–3)	Florida State (10–3)	USC (15–3)	Missouri (13–5)	Arkansas (17–5)	Loyola–Chicago (21–4)	Texas Tech (17–9) т	Purdue (18–9)	20.
21.	Florida State	Oregon (0–0)	Rutgers (3–0)	Duke (2–2)	Florida State (4–1)	Oregon (6–1) т	Duke (3–2)	Ohio State (9–3)	Oregon (9–2)	Minnesota (11–6)	UCLA (13–3)	Wisconsin (14–6)	Wisconsin (15–7)	Loyola–Chicago (19–4)	Virginia (15–6)	Purdue (18–8) т	Texas Tech (17–10)	21.
22.	UCLA	Florida State (0–0)	Ohio State (3–0)	North Carolina (4–2)	Xavier (8–0)	Minnesota (8–1) т	Virginia (5–2)	Oregon (9–2)	Illinois (9–5)	Saint Louis (7–1)	Florida (10–4)	Loyola–Chicago (17–3)	Loyola–Chicago (18–4)	San Diego State (17–4)	Virginia Tech (15–5)	Virginia Tech (15–5)	Colorado (22–8)	22.
23.	Ohio State	Ohio State (2–0)	Arizona State (3–1)	Louisville (4–0)	Ohio State (6–1)	Virginia (4–2)	Saint Louis (7–1)	Minnesota (10–4)	UConn (7–1)	UCLA (12–3)	Kansas (11–6)	Oklahoma State (12–5)	Kansas (15–7)	Wisconsin (16–8)	Purdue (16–8)	Colorado (20–7)	BYU (20–6)	23.
24.	Rutgers	Rutgers (3–0)	San Diego State (4–0)	Clemson (5–0)	Virginia Tech (6–1)	Virginia Tech (7–1)	Michigan State (7–3)	Saint Louis (7–1)	UCLA (11–2)	Oklahoma (9–4)	Purdue (12–6)	Purdue (13–7)	Arkansas (16–5)	Missouri (14–6)	Colorado (19–7)	USC (21–6)	USC (22–7)	24.
25.	Michigan	Arizona State (2–1)	Louisville (4–0)	Michigan (6–0)	Oregon (6–1)	Ohio State (7–2)	Florida State (5–2)	UConn (6–1)	Saint Louis (7–1)	Louisville (10–3)	Drake (16–0)	Rutgers (11–6)	San Diego State (15-4)	Tennessee (15–6)	Wisconsin (16–9)	Oklahoma (14–9)	Virginia Tech (15–6)	25.
	Preseason Nov 9	Week 2 Nov 30	Week 3 Dec 7	Week 4 Dec 14	Week 5 Dec 21	Week 6 Dec 28	Week 7 Jan 4	Week 8 Jan 11	Week 9 Jan 18	Week 10 Jan 25	Week 11 Feb 1	Week 12 Feb 8	Week 13 Feb 15	Week 14 Feb 22	Week 15 Mar 1	Week 16 Mar 8	Final Mar 15	
		Dropped: UCLA (1–1); Michigan (2–0)	Dropped: Kentucky (1–3); Oregon (1–1)	Dropped: Virginia Tech (4–1); Richmond (4–1); Arizona State (4–2)	Dropped: San Diego State (5–1); Louisville (4–1); Clemson (5–1)	Dropped: North Carolina (5–3); Xavier (8–1)	Dropped: Northwestern (6–3); Ohio State (8–3)	Dropped: Rutgers (7−4); Michigan State (8–5); Florida State (5–2)	Dropped: Louisville (8–2); Duke (5–3)	Dropped: Clemson (9–4); Oregon (9–3); UConn (7–3)	Dropped: Minnesota (11–6); Saint Louis (7–1); Louisville (10–4)	Dropped: UCLA (13–4); Florida (10–5); Kansas (11–7); Drake (18–1)	Dropped: Oklahoma State (13–6); Purdue (13–8); Rutgers (12–7)	None	Dropped: USC (19–6); Missouri (14–7); Tennessee (16–7)	Dropped: Wisconsin (16–11)	Dropped: Oklahoma (15–10)	

== USA Today Coaches Poll ==
The Coaches Poll is the second-oldest poll still in use after the AP Poll. It is compiled by a rotating group of 31 college Division I head coaches. The poll operates by Borda count. Each voting member ranks teams from 1 to 25. Each team then receives points for their ranking in reverse order: Number 1 earns 25 points, number 2 earns 24 points, and so forth. The points are then combined and the team with the highest number of points is then ranked No. 1; second highest is ranked No. 2 and so forth. Only the top 25 teams with points are ranked, with teams receiving first-place votes noted the quantity next to their name. The maximum points a single team can earn is 775.

	Preseason Nov 9	Week 2 Dec 7	Week 3 Dec 14	Week 4 Dec 21	Week 5 Dec 28	Week 6 Jan 4	Week 7 Jan 11	Week 8 Jan 18	Week 9 Jan 25	Week 10 Feb 1	Week 11 Feb 8	Week 12 Feb 15	Week 13 Feb 22	Week 14 Mar 1	Week 15 Mar 8	Week 16 Mar 15	Final Apr 6	
1.	Baylor (12)	Gonzaga (3–0) (23)	Gonzaga (3–0) (24)	Gonzaga (4–0) (25)	Gonzaga (7–0) (29)	Gonzaga (10–0) (29)	Gonzaga (12–0) (29)	Gonzaga (14–0) (28)	Gonzaga (15–0) (29)	Gonzaga (17–0) (28)	Gonzaga (18–0) (28)	Gonzaga (20–0) (28)	Gonzaga (22–0) (28)	Gonzaga (24–0) (31)	Gonzaga (24–0) (31)	Gonzaga (26–0) (32)	Baylor (28–2) (32)	1.
2.	Gonzaga (10)	Baylor (3–0) (8)	Baylor (3–0) (6)	Baylor (5–0) (5)	Baylor (6–0) (3)	Baylor (6–0) (3)	Baylor (11–0) (3)	Baylor (12–0) (3)	Baylor (14–0) (3)	Baylor (16–0) (4)	Baylor (17–0) (4)	Baylor (17–0) (4)	Baylor (17–0) (4)	Michigan (18–1) (1)	Baylor (21–1)	Illinois (22–6)	Gonzaga (31–1)	2.
3.	Villanova (8)	Iowa (3–0) (1)	Iowa (6–0) (2)	Villanova (7–1)	Villanova (8–1)	Villanova (8–1)	Villanova (8–1)	Villanova (8–1)	Villanova (10–1)	Villanova (11–1)	Michigan (13–1)	Michigan (14–1)	Michigan (16–1) (1)	Baylor (18–1)	Illinois (20–6)	Baylor (22–2)	Houston (28–4)	3.
4.	Virginia	Michigan State (5–0)	Michigan State (6–0)	Kansas (7–1)	Kansas (8–1)	Texas (8–1)	Texas (10–1)	Iowa (12–2)	Michigan (13–1)	Michigan (13–1)	Villanova (12–2)	Ohio State (17–4)	Illinois (16–5)	Illinois (18–6)	Michigan (19–3)	Michigan (20–4)	Michigan (23–5)	4.
5.	Kansas	Kansas (4–1)	Kansas (6–1)	Iowa (6–1)	Houston (7–0)	Creighton (8–1)	Michigan (10–0)	Texas (11–2)	Texas (11–2)	Houston (15–1)	Ohio State (15–4)	Illinois (14–5) т	Ohio State (18–5)	West Virginia (17–6) т	Alabama (21–6)	Alabama (24–6)	Alabama (26–7)	5.
6.	Iowa (1)	Villanova (4–1)	Villanova (5–1)	West Virginia (7–1)	Tennessee (6–0)	Kansas (8–2)	Creighton (10–2)	Tennessee (10–1)	Houston (13–1)	Texas (11–3)	Illinois (13–5)	Houston (17–2) т	Villanova (14–3)	Alabama (19–6) т	Iowa (20–7)	Houston (23–3)	Arkansas (25–7)	6.
7.	Wisconsin	Creighton (3–0)	West Virginia (6–1)	Houston (5–0)	Wisconsin (8–1)	Iowa (8–2)	Kansas (10–2)	Michigan (11–1)	Iowa (12–3)	Alabama (14–4)	Houston (16–2)	Villanova (13–3)	Alabama (18–5)	Houston (20–3)	Houston (21–3)	Ohio State (21–8)	UCLA (22–10)	7.
8.	Duke (1)	Houston (4–0)	Houston (4–0)	Tennessee (4–0)	West Virginia (7–2)	Tennessee (7–1)	Iowa (11–2)	Houston (11–1)	Virginia (10–2)	Iowa (12–4)	Texas Tech (14–5)	Virginia (15–3)	Oklahoma (14–5)	Iowa (18–7)	Arkansas (21–5)	Iowa (21–8)	Illinois (24–7)	8.
9.	Kentucky	Illinois (3–1)	Creighton (4–1)	Wisconsin (6–1)	Texas (7–1)	Michigan (9–0)	Wisconsin (10–2)	Kansas (10–3)	Alabama (13–3)	Ohio State (14–4)	Virginia (13–3)	Alabama (17–5)	Florida State (13–3)	Villanova (15–4)	West Virginia (18–8)	Texas (19–7)	USC (25–8)	9.
10.	Illinois	West Virginia (4–1)	Tennessee (2–0)	Texas (7–1)	Creighton (7–2)	Wisconsin (9–2)	Tennessee (9–1)	Wisconsin (11–3)	Texas Tech (11–4)	Tennessee (12–3)	Missouri (13–3)	Oklahoma (13–5)	Houston (18–3)	Ohio State (18–7)	Ohio State (18–8)	Arkansas (22–6)	Florida State (18–7)	10.
11.	Creighton	Duke (2–1)	Texas (5–1)	Michigan State (6–1)	Iowa (7–2)	Houston (8–1)	Houston (10–1)	Creighton (10–3)	West Virginia (10–4)	Texas Tech (12–5)	Alabama (15–5)	Texas Tech (14–6)	Creighton (16–5)	Florida State (14–4)	Villanova (16–5)	Kansas (20–8)	Villanova (18–7)	11.
12.	Michigan State	Texas (4–1)	Wisconsin (4–1)	Rutgers (6–0)	Missouri (6–0)	Illinois (8–3)	Clemson (9–1)	Virginia (9–2)	Missouri (10–2)	Creighton (13–4)	Oklahoma (12–5)	Creighton (16–5)	Iowa (17–6)	Creighton (17–6)	Kansas (19–8)	Oklahoma State (20–8)	Loyola-Chicago (26–5)	12.
13.	Texas Tech	Wisconsin (3–1)	Illinois (4–2)	Creighton (6–2)	Rutgers (6–1)	Missouri (7–1)	Illinois (9–4)	Texas Tech (11–4)	Wisconsin (12–4)	Illinois (11–5)	Texas (11–5)	Texas (13–5)	West Virginia (15–6)	Arkansas (19–5)	Florida State (15–5)	West Virginia (18–9)	Iowa (22–9)	13.
14.	Tennessee	North Carolina (3–1)	Texas Tech (6–1)	Missouri (5–0)	Texas Tech (7–2)	Rutgers (7–2)	West Virginia (9–4)	Virginia Tech (11–2)	Creighton (11–4)	Oklahoma (11–4)	West Virginia (13–5)	Iowa (15–6)	Virginia (15–5)	Kansas (18–8)	Oklahoma State (18–7)	Florida State (16–6)	Creighton (22–9)	14.
15.	West Virginia	Virginia Tech (4–0)	Florida State (3–0)	Virginia (3–1)	Michigan (7–0)	Oregon (8–1)	Texas Tech (10–3)	West Virginia (9–4)	Ohio State (12–4)	Virginia (11–3)	Tennessee (13–4)	West Virginia (14–6)	Virginia Tech (14–4)	Oklahoma (14–7)	Virginia (17–6)	Virginia (18–6)	Ohio State (21–10)	15.
16.	North Carolina	Tennessee (0–0)	Virginia (3–1)	Texas Tech (6–2)	Illinois (7–3)	West Virginia (8–13)	Missouri (7–2)	Alabama (11–3)	Florida State (9–2)	Virginia Tech (13–3)	Iowa (13–6)	Florida State (11–3)	Texas (13–6)	Texas (14–7)	Texas (17–7)	Loyola–Chicago (24–4)	Kansas (21–9)	16.
17.	Arizona State	Texas Tech (4–1)	Rutgers (4–0)	North Carolina (5–2)	Oregon (6–1)	Minnesota (10–2)	Oregon (9–2)	Minnesota (11–4)	Tennessee (10–3)	Missouri (11–3)	Virginia Tech (14–4)	Virginia Tech (14–4)	Texas Tech (14–7)	Oklahoma State (16–6)	Creighton (18–7)	Villanova (16–6)	Oregon (22–7)	17.
18.	Houston т	Virginia (3–1)	Missouri (5–0)	Illinois (5–3)	Michigan State (6–2)	Clemson (8–1)	Louisville (8–1)	Ohio State (11–3)	Kansas (10–5)	West Virginia (11–5)	Creighton (14–5)	USC (17–3)	USC (18–4)	Texas Tech (15–8)	Loyola–Chicago (24–4)	San Diego State (23–4)	West Virginia (19–10)	18.
19.	Florida State т	Richmond (2–0)	Ohio State (5–0)	Michigan (6–0)	Florida State (5–1)	Texas Tech (8–3)	Minnesota (10–4)	Missouri (8–2)	Virginia Tech (11–3)	Florida State (10–3)	Florida State (10–3)	Missouri (13–5)	Kansas (17–7)	Virginia Tech (15–8)	San Diego State (20–4) т	Creighton (20–8)	Oklahoma State (21–9)	19.
20.	Oregon	Ohio State (3–0)	San Diego State (5–0)	Ohio State (6–1)	Xavier (8–1) т	Virginia Tech (8–1)	Virginia Tech (9–2)	UCLA (11–2)	Minnesota (11–5)	Wisconsin (13–5)	USC (15–3)	Tennessee (14–5)	Arkansas (17–5)	Virginia (15–6)	Purdue (18–8) т	Purdue (18–9)	Oregon State (20–13)	20.
21.	UCLA	Florida State (1–0)	North Carolina (4–2)	Florida State (4–1)	Ohio State (7–2) т	Virginia (5–2)	UCLA (9–2)	Oregon (9–2)	UCLA (12–3)	UCLA (13–3)	Wisconsin (14–6)	Wisconsin (15–7)	Oklahoma State (14–6)	San Diego State (19–4)	Virginia Tech (15–5)	Texas Tech (17–10)	Texas (19–8)	21.
22.	Texas	Rutgers (3–0)	Louisville (4–0)	Xavier (8–0)	Northwestern (6–1)	Florida State (5–2)	Virginia (7–2)	Clemson (9–2)	Illinois (10–5)	Kansas (11–6)	Oklahoma State (12–5)	Oklahoma State (13–6)	Loyola–Chicago (19–4)	Loyola–Chicago (21–4)	Texas Tech (17–9)	Colorado (22–8)	Texas Tech (18–11)	22.
23.	Rutgers	Arizona State (3–1)	Duke (2–2)	Richmond (6–1)	San Diego State (6–1)	Saint Louis (7–1)	Duke (5–2)	Colorado (11–3)	Louisville (10–3)	Florida (10–4)	Loyola–Chicago (17–3)	Loyola–Chicago (18–4)	Oregon (14–4)	Purdue (16–8)	USC (21–6)	USC (22–7)	Colorado (23–9)	23.
24.	Ohio State	Louisville (4–0)	Michigan (6–0)	Oregon (6–1)	Virginia (4–2) т	Duke (3–2)	Saint Louis (7–1)	Illinois (9–5)	Saint Louis (7–1)	Oklahoma State (11–4)	UCLA (13–4)	Kansas (15–7)	Wisconsin (16–8)	USC (19–6)	Oklahoma (14–9)	Virginia Tech (15–6)	Virginia (18–7)	24.
25.	Alabama	Florida (3–0)	Richmond (4–1)	Duke (3–2)	Minnesota (8–1) т	Louisville (7–1)	Alabama (9–3)	Florida State (7–2)	Oregon (9–3)	Drake (16–0)	Purdue (13–7)	Oregon (12–4)	San Diego State (17–4)	Oregon (16–5)	Oregon (19–5)	Oregon (20–6)	Syracuse (18–10)	25.
	Preseason Nov 9	Week 2 Dec 7	Week 3 Dec 14	Week 4 Dec 21	Week 5 Dec 28	Week 6 Jan 4	Week 7 Jan 11	Week 8 Jan 18	Week 9 Jan 25	Week 10 Feb 1	Week 11 Feb 8	Week 12 Feb 15	Week 13 Feb 22	Week 14 Mar 1	Week 15 Mar 8	Week 16 Mar 15	Final Apr 6	
		Dropped: Kentucky (1–3); Oregon (1–1); UCLA (3–1); Alabama (3–1)	Dropped: Virginia Tech (4–1); Arizona State (4–2); Florida (3–1)	Dropped: San Diego St. (5–1); Louisville (4–1)	Dropped: North Carolina (5–3); Richmond (6–2); Duke (3–2)	Dropped: Michigan State (7–3); Xavier (8–2); Ohio State (8–3); Northwestern (6–3); San Diego State (6–2)	Dropped: Rutgers (7–5); Florida State (5–2)	Dropped: Louisville (9–2); Duke (5–3); Saint Louis (7–1)	Dropped: Clemson (9–4); Colorado (12–4)	Dropped: Minnesota (11–6); Louisville (10–4); Saint Louis (7–1); Oregon (9–3)	Dropped: Kansas (12–7); Florida (10–5); Drake (18–1)	Dropped: UCLA (14–5); Purdue (13–8)	Dropped: Missouri (14–6); Tennessee (15–6)	Dropped: Wisconsin (16–9)	Dropped: None	Dropped: Oklahoma (15–10)	Dropped: San Diego State (23–5); Purdue (18–10); Virginia Tech (15–7)	

== See also ==
- 2020–21 NCAA Division I women's basketball rankings
