= Scottish Funding Council =

Scottish education funding council

Scottish Further and Higher Education Funding Council
- Comhairle Maoineachaidh na h-Alba
- The English-language logo of the SFC, used since 2008.

Non-departmental public body overview
- Formed: October 5, 2005
- Preceding agencies: SFEFC; SHEFC
- Jurisdiction: Scotland
- Headquarters: Apex 2, 97 Haymarket Terrace, Edinburgh, EH12 5HD; 55.9457°N 3.2235°W
- Motto: Promoting further and higher education
- Employees: 115 FTE (2018-19)
- Annual budget: £1.8 billion (2018-19)
- Non-departmental public body executives: Mike Cantlay, Chair; Francesca Osowska, Chief Executive
- Parent department: Scottish Government
- Key document: Further and Higher Education (Scotland) Act 2005
- Website: www.sfc.ac.uk

The Scottish Funding Council's logo in English and Scottish Gaelic.

The Scottish Funding Council (Scottish Gaelic: Comhairle Maoineachaidh na h-Alba; SFC), formally the Scottish Further and Higher Education Funding Council, is the non-departmental public body charged with funding Scotland's further and higher education institutions, including its 26 colleges and 19 universities.

The council was established by the Further and Higher Education (Scotland) Act 2005. It supersedes the two separate funding councils, the Scottish Further Education Funding Council (SFEFC) and the Scottish Higher Education Funding Council (SHEFC), which were established by the Further and Higher Education (Scotland) Act 1992. On its formation, the SFC acquired all employees and assets of those councils.

== History ==
=== Predecessors under the 1992 Act ===
The SFEFC and SHEFC were defined by the Further and Higher Education (Scotland) Act 1992. The Act made further education (FE) institutions independent from local authorities, a side effect of which was the shifting of funding responsibility from those authorities to the Scottish Office of HM Government. This Act also formed a "higher education (HE) sector" in Scotland, transferring various powers and duties related to HE institutions to the funding councils.

The 1992 Act, which was paralleled by an Act applying only to England and Wales, was not brought into force immediately. Instead, the SHEFC was established by commencement order on 1 June 1992, and the SFEFC was established by a further commencement order on 1 January 1999.

As part of Scottish devolution under the Scotland Act 1998, powers, duties, and responsibilities related to the councils and education institutions were, in June 1999, transferred from the Scottish Office to the then-Scottish Executive.

=== Establishment through the 2005 Act ===
In April 2004, the Scottish Executive published a consultation paper requesting comment on a possible merger of the SFEFC and SHEFC. The paper cited concerns about the overlapping remits of the two councils – some FE institutions provided HE courses, but funding was allocated based on institution type and not on courses taught – and made the case that a single council would be able to fund collaboration between institutions to a greater degree than two separate councils.

On 20 April 2005, the Scottish Parliament passed the Further and Higher Education (Scotland) 2005 Act. The Act received royal assent on 1 June 2005. This Act established the Scottish Further and Higher Education Funding Council, set out its role and functions, and made provision for the dissolution of the SFEFC and SHEFC. The SFC's establishment was brought into force on 3 October 2005, and the SFEFC and SHEFC were dissolved on 8 September 2005.

The SFC was established as a non-departmental public body, meaning it operates with partial autonomy from the Scottish Ministers and may act in an advisory role. The council typically receives a letter of guidance from the Cabinet Secretary for Education and Lifelong Learning each year. These letters detail the priorities and recommendations of the Scottish Ministers with regard to Scottish colleges and universities.

Under schedule 1 of the 2005 Act, the SFC was transferred all staff, property, and liabilities of the SFEFC and SHEFC, effectively merging the two councils. This schedule explicitly did not grant the SFC status as a Crown servant or agency, but some resources published by the SFC are still covered by Crown copyright and the Open Government Licence.

Schedule 2 of the Act identified "fundable bodies" – further and higher education bodies that are eligible for funding from the SFC – by listing those bodies formerly covered separately by the SFEFC and SHEFC. Since the establishment of the SFC, this schedule has been amended numerous times to reflect the current state of eligibility for SFC funding.

=== Expansion of remit by the 2013 Act ===
The Scottish Parliament passed, on 26 June 2013, the Post-16 Education (Scotland) Act 2013. The Act makes various provisions regarding the governance, structure, and review of FE and HE institutions. The Act also defines regional strategic bodies, and makes them fundable by the SFC. Before the introduction of this Act, the SFC had only funded FE institutions (colleges) and HE institutions (universities and select colleges).

A regional strategic body is a body corporate created under the Act to ensure that the colleges in its assigned region provide high-quality education and to make and oversee the carrying out of plans for its colleges to deliver further and higher education. The Act allows such bodies to provide grants, loans, or other payments to its colleges to fund the provision of further or higher education, to fund research by those colleges, and to fund the provision of related facilities and services by those colleges.

=== Colleges reclassification by ONS ===
Effective 1 April 2014, the Office for National Statistics (ONS) reclassified Scotland's further education colleges to the public sector. The effects of this change were that funds held by the college would now count as the Scottish Government's funds, and that college spending from its reserves would count towards annual budget limits. It also meant that a college would only be permitted to maintain as much working capital as necessary for the college's operation.

== Functions ==
In addition to its main function of funding Scotland's HE and FE institutions, the SFC has other roles and carries out other tasks related to Scotland's education sectors.

In Scotland, colleges and universities are registered charities. However, unlike its English counterpart HEFCE, the SFC does not act as the charities regulator for colleges and universities. Instead, this role is retained by the Office of the Scottish Charity Regulator (OSCR). OSCR and the SFC operate under a memorandum of understanding.

=== Advisory role ===
The SFC provides advice to the Scottish Ministers relating to Scotland's HE and FE sectors. Specifically, it provides advice regarding how education is being provided, and regarding the research undertaken at HE and FE institutions funded by the SFC. The council is also afforded the right to directly advise and address fundable bodies regarding their SFC-provided funding.

Internally, the SFC is advised by its committees and advisory groups.

=== Assessments ===
The SFC is permitted to perform a number of assessments and studies on issues relating to its funding of bodies. Under the 2005 Act, the SFC can assess the efficiency and efficacy of a fundable body's management and operations, as well as the quality of education provided by such bodies. The assessment duties of the SFC were expanded under the Post-16 Education (Scotland) Act to include the promotion of the participation in education of under-represented socioeconomic classes, and to perform triennial reviews of the participation of those classes.

== Structure ==
=== Council ===
The council's structure is set out in schedule 1 of the 2005 Act. It consists of a chief executive, a chairperson, and between 11 and 14 members. Excluding the chief executive, all council members are appointed by the Scottish Ministers. An appointment typically lasts for no more than four years, but may be extended to eight years by the Ministers. The chief executive is appointed by the council, subject to ministerial approval.

The 2005 Act doesn't set out the proceedings of council, instead allowing the council to regulate its own proceedings. The council does this through a set of standing orders, a code of conduct, and a written scheme of delegation – a document outlining how and to whom the council delegates its authority.

==== Committees ====
Under the council there are six committees, each tasked with advising on and overseeing various areas of the council's operation. The various committees oversee areas such as improving knowledge of the skills required by the Scottish economy in partnership with Skills Development Scotland; supporting research and knowledge exchange by HE and FE institutions; reporting on and promoting equality, diversity, and participation in education; monitoring the financial performance of the HE and FE sectors, and monitoring the council's internal risk management, corporate governance, and auditing; monitoring and reporting on the internal finance matters of the council; and making decisions, with the agreement of the Scottish Government, on remuneration for the council's chair, chief executive, directors, and members.

Two of the committees, the Skills and Research & Knowledge Exchange committees, were required to be established under the 2005 Act.

=== Advisory groups ===
==== Innovation Scotland Forum ====
Innovation Scotland is a joint initiative between the SFC, Scottish Enterprise, and Highlands and Islands Enterprise to promote entrepreneurship and encourage collaboration between Scottish universities and businesses. The Innovation Scotland Forum is a working group which discusses related national policy, and provides advice to the SFC and the Scottish Government.

==== College European Funding Liaison Group ====
The College European Funding Liaison Group (CEFLG) is responsible for advising the council on matters relating to the European Social Fund (ESF), including providing guidance to colleges, monitoring and regulation relating to ESF grants and European projects, and related data collection.

==== Institutional Group on Statistics ====
The Institutional Group on Statistics (IGS) provides advice on and gathers statistics on higher education institutions, and participates in activities by the Higher Education Statistics Agency.

==== Statistical Advisory Group for Further Education ====
The Statistical Advisory Group for Further Education (SAGE) is the equivalent of the IGS for further education institutions.

=== Directorates ===
The employees of the SFC are split across four directorates, each working in the various areas of the council's operation. The directorates are headed by employees of the council rather than by council members.

==== Access, Skills and Outcome Agreements ====
The Access, Skills and Outcome Agreements Directorate is responsible for the preparation of the outcome agreements the council makes with fundable bodies, and has responsibilities relating to access to and the quality of education.

==== Finance ====
The Finance Directorate is responsible for the application of SFC funds in relation to outcome agreements, the protection of SFC funds, and for providing guidance to FE colleges.

==== Corporate Services ====
The Corporate Services Directorate has responsibility for council communications, project delivery, website administration, human resources management, and information technology.

==== Research and Innovation ====
The Research and Innovation Directorate is responsible for research, knowledge sharing between Innovation Centres, development of the Research Excellence Framework, and liaison with Bòrd na Gàidhlig and NHS Education for Scotland. The directorate also provides guidance and funding to the SFC's fundable bodies for work towards compliance with the Climate Change Act 2008.

A team within the directorate is the Capital and Climate Change team, which works with HE and FE institutions for compliance with the Climate Change Act 2008 and to assist those institutions with funding for low-carbon research.

== Funding ==
=== Outcome agreements ===
Each institution funded by the SFC secures its funding under an outcome agreement. The agreements define what the institution will do with the funds and the targets it must achieve with those funds. If an institution fails to follow the agreement, the SFC may claw back funds from that institution. In 2009, the SFC threatened to claw back money from Stow College after it claimed £988 000 in funding for courses that the Auditor General for Scotland deemed to have been ineligible. After reviewing the eligibility of the college's programmes for funding, the SFC clawed back £2.88 million, to be paid over seven years starting November 2009.

For example, the 2014-17 outcome agreement for Edinburgh College included targets such as raising non-SFC income from 29% to 35% of the college's total income, raising the number of full-time students on work placements from 1419 to 5000, and raising the proportion of women enrolled in construction and engineering courses from 6.7% to 7.4%.

=== Student support ===
For students in higher education, the Student Awards Agency for Scotland (SAAS) provides tuition fees, bursaries, and loans. "Higher education" covers courses at Scottish Credit and Qualifications Framework (SCQF) level 7 and above, including Higher National Certificates and Higher National Diplomas but excluding Advanced Highers.

For students in further education, the SFC provides funding to the college, and that college then distributes the funds to students. The courses covered are generally at SCQF level 5 (National 5 or a Modern Apprenticeship) or level 6 (Higher or National Certificate). The funds the SFC provides are used by colleges to provide bursaries, Education Maintenance Allowance, as well as to fund each college's discretionary funds.

=== Innovation centres ===
The Innovation Centres programme is a joint initiative between the SFC, Scottish Enterprise, and Highlands and Islands Enterprise to fund collaboration between universities and businesses, and to promote entrepreneurship. The SFC has stated that it will provide £120 million in funding through 2013 to 2018 and, as of June 2016, has funded eight Innovation Centres:

- Digital Health & Care Institute
- Stratified Medicine Scotland
- Centre for Sensor and Imaging Systems (CENSIS)
- Industrial Biotechnology Innovation Centre (IBioIC)
- Scottish Aquaculture Innovation Centre (SAIC)
- Oil & Gas Innovation Centre (OGIC)
- Construction Scotland Innovation Centre (CSIC)
- The Data Lab

Some of the centres are located at Scottish universities, including Stirling University (SAIC), the Queen Elizabeth University Hospital (Stratified Medicine), and the University of Edinburgh (the Data Lab). The Innovation Centres are not listed as fundable bodies, and so are not eligible for funding the same sense HE and FE institutions are.

=== Fundable bodies ===
A fundable body is a body which is eligible to receive funding from the SFC, as listed by schedules 2 and 2A of the Further and Higher Education (Scotland) Act 2005. These schedules have been amended numerous times as bodies have been created, merged, and dissolved. Those bodies currently listed in the schedules are given below.

Bodies eligible for SFC funding as of May 2025
Universities and Higher Education Institutions
Abertay University	Edinburgh Napier University	Glasgow Caledonian University	Glasgow School of Art
Heriot-Watt University	The Open University	Queen Margaret University	Royal Conservatoire of Scotland
University of Aberdeen	University of Dundee	University of Edinburgh	University of Glasgow
University of the Highlands and Islands	University of St. Andrews	University of Stirling	University of Strathclyde
University of the West of Scotland
Further Education Colleges
Ayrshire College	Borders College	City of Glasgow College	Coatbridge College
Dumfries and Galloway College	Dundee and Angus College	Edinburgh College	Fife College
Forth Valley College	Glasgow Clyde College	Glasgow Kelvin College	Inverness College
Lews Castle College	Moray College	New College Lanarkshire	Newbattle Abbey College
North East Scotland College	North Highland College	Orkney College	Perth College UHI
Sabhal Mòr Ostaig	Shetland College	South Lanarkshire College	West College Scotland
West Highland College UHI	West Lothian College		
Other Institutions
The Robert Gordon University (Note: The Robert Gordon University appears in Other Institutions because its structure was changed such that the university itself was incorporated rather than the university's governing body.)	SRUC (Note: Scotland's Rural College ("SRUC" in the schedule) appears in Other Institutions as a result of the amendments by SSI 2008/241 – which placed the Scottish Agricultural College in this section – and SSI 2013/319, which replaced the Scottish Agricultural College with SRUC.)		
Regional Boards
Regional Board for Glasgow Colleges
Other Regional Strategic Bodies
New College Lanarkshire	University of the Highlands and Islands		

Some amendments to the list of fundable bodies have caused a single body to appear in multiple categories. The bodies listed here were added by one of:

- Further and Higher Education (Scotland) Act 2005
- The Fundable Bodies (Scotland) Order 2005
- The Fundable Bodies (Scotland) Order 2006
- The Fundable Bodies (Scotland) (No. 2) Order 2007
- The Fundable Bodies (Scotland) Order 2008
- The Fundable Bodies (University of the Highlands and Islands) Order 2011
- The Fundable Bodies (Royal Conservatoire of Scotland) Order 2011
- The Fundable Bodies (Scotland) Order 2012
- The Fundable Bodies (Scotland) Order 2013
- Post-16 Education (Scotland) Act 2013
- The Lanarkshire Colleges Order 2014

Other orders designating fundable bodies exist, but the bodies designated therein were removed by later orders or Acts.

=== Budget ===
SFC budget, 2010–2015
±	Period	Volume	Change
Steady	2010/11	£ 1,657 M	—
▲	2011/12	£ 1,672 M	0.96%
▲	2012/13	£ 1,702 M	1.76%
▲	2013/14	£ 1,728 M	1.50%
▼	2014/15	£ 1,711 M	0.98%

The SFC itself is primarily funded by the Scottish Government, but its budget also receives minor contributions from HM Government, the European Social Fund (ESF), and from claw-back arrangements with fundable bodies. For the period 2014/15, the SFC's £1.71 billion budget was composed of £1.67 billion (97.6%) from the Scottish Government, £22.05 million (1.29%) from HEFCE, £11.64 million (0.68%) from the Department for Business, Innovation and Skills, £6.34 million (0.37%) from claw-back arrangements, and £1.12 million (0.06%) from the ESF.

From 2010 to 2015, the SFC's budget increased by a net £54 million, or 3.16%.

From this budget, the SFC provided £1.702 billion in funding in its 2014/15 financial year, of which £1.124 billion was paid to HE institutions and £577.9 million was paid to FE institutions. Of the funds distributed to FE institutions, £453.4 million was general funding, £106.4 million was student support funding, and £18.1 million was classified as "capital and major works" funding. The remainder of its budget was put towards costs associated with the operation of the SFC.

== See also ==
- Medr (Wales)
- Office for Students
- Higher education division of the Department for the Economy
- Universities Scotland
- Re-Engineering Assessment Practices
