= List of further education colleges in Scotland =

List of colleges

This is a list of current further education and higher education colleges in Scotland. Most colleges provide both levels of qualification.

Further education colleges offer courses for people over the age of sixteen, involving school-level qualifications such as Higher Grade exams, as well as work-based learning.

Higher education colleges offer degree-level courses, such as diplomas.

Scottish colleges are funded primarily by the Scottish Funding Council, with tuition fees paid by individual students or their sponsors.

Not included in this list are a number of colleges which became affiliated with the UHI Millennium Institute, a grouping of further education colleges mostly located in the Highlands, in 2001. Since January 2011, these 13 colleges are now officially federated as constituent colleges of the University of the Highlands and Islands upon being granted university status.

College	Location	Founded	Notes
Ayrshire College	Ayr, Kilmarnock, Kilwinning and Largs	2013	Merger of Ayr College, Kilmarnock College and the Kilwinning and Largs campuses of James Watt College
Borders College	Galashiels, Hawick, Newtown St Boswells and Tweedbank	1984	Merger of the Agricultural Centre at Newtown St Boswells, Duns Agricultural Centre, Galashiels Technical College and Henderson Technical College
City of Glasgow College	Glasgow	2010	Merger of Central College (previously Central College of Commerce, Glasgow College of Nautical Studies and Glasgow Metropolitan College — itself a merger of Glasgow College of Building and Printing and Glasgow College of Food Technology)
Dumfries and Galloway College	Dumfries and Stranraer	1973	
Dundee and Angus College	Arbroath and Dundee	2013	Merger of Angus College and Dundee College
Edinburgh College	Dalkeith and Edinburgh	2012	Merger of Edinburgh's Telford College, Jewel and Esk College and Stevenson College, Edinburgh
Fife College	Cowdenbeath, Cupar, Dunfermline, Glenrothes, Kirkcaldy, Leven, Lochgelly and Rosyth	2013	Merger of Adam Smith College, Carnegie College and the Elmwood campus of SRUC. Not to be confused with the former Fife College which merged into Adam Smith College.
Forth Valley College	Alloa, Falkirk and Stirling	2005	Merger of Clackmannan College and Falkirk College
Glasgow Clyde College	Glasgow and Rutherglen	2013	Merger of Anniesland College, Cardonald College and Langside College
Glasgow Kelvin College	Glasgow	2013	Merger of John Wheatley College, North Glasgow College and Stow College
Glasgow School of Art	Glasgow	1845	
Leith School of Art	Edinburgh	1987	
New College Lanarkshire	Coatbridge, Cumbernauld and Motherwell	2013	Merger of Cumbernauld College and Motherwell College. Absorbed Coatbridge College in 2014.
Newbattle Abbey College	Dalkeith	1937	
North East Scotland College	Aberdeen and Fraserburgh	2013	Merger of Aberdeen College and Banff and Buchan College
Royal Conservatoire of Scotland	Glasgow	1845	
Scotland's Rural College (SRUC)	Aberdeen, Ayr, Broxburn, Dumfries, and Edinburgh	2012	Merger of Barony College, Elmwood College, Oatridge Agricultural College and the Scottish Agricultural College The Elmwood Campus in Cupar was transferred to Fife College in 2013.
South Lanarkshire College	East Kilbride	1948	
West College Scotland	Clydebank, Greenock and Paisley	2013	Merger of Clydebank College, the Greenock Campus of James Watt College, and Reid Kerr College
West Lothian College	Livingston	1965	Relocated from Bathgate to Livingston in 2001

== See also ==
- Education in Scotland
- List of further education colleges in England
- List of further education colleges in Wales
- List of universities in Scotland
- List of further education colleges in Northern Ireland
