= Kentrell Barkley =

American basketball player (born 1996)

Free agent
- Position: Small forward / power forward

Personal information
- Born: September 1, 1996 (age 30) Durham, North Carolina, U.S.
- Listed height: 6 ft 5 in (1.96 m)
- Listed weight: 205 lb (93 kg)

Career information
- High school: Northern (Durham, North Carolina)
- College: East Carolina (2015–2018)
- NBA draft: 2018: undrafted
- Playing career: 2018–present

Career history
- 2018: Rio Grande Valley Vipers
- 2019: Mount Gambier Pioneers
- 2019–2020: Taiwan Beer
- 2021–2022: Kordall Steelers
- 2022: Taiwan Beer
- 2023: Singapore Slingers
- 2023: Saigon Heat
- 2023–2024, 2025–2026: Kesatria Bengawan Solo
- 2026: Blackwater Bossing

Career highlights
- IBL rebound leader (2026); IBL Most Valuable Player (2024); All-IBL First Team (2024, 2026); VBA champion (2023); VBA Most Valuable Player (2023); VBA Finals MVP (2023); SBL Best Foreign Player of the Year (2020); SBL champion (2020); All-SBL First Team (2020); AAC All-Rookie Team (2016)

Kentrell Debarrus Barkley (born September 1, 1996) is an American professional basketball player who last played for the Blackwater Bossing of the Philippine Basketball Association (PBA). He played college basketball for the East Carolina Pirates.

== College career ==
Barkley played in 87 games and made 63 starts for the pirates, and averaged 11.8 points, 7.0 rebounds and 30.8 minutes per game during his three-year career. In his freshman season he played 31 games, and averaged 10.1 points and was selected to the 2015–16 American Athletic Conference All-Rookie Team.

== Professional career ==
=== Rio Grande Valley Vipers ===
On October 20, 2018, Barkley was selected by the Santa Cruz Warriors with the 17th pick in the first round of the 2018 NBA G League draft and was traded to the Rio Grande Valley Vipers. On December 18, the Rio Grande Valley Vipers released Barkley for re-acquisition of Gary Payton II.

=== Mount Gambier Pioneers ===
In mid-January 2019, Mount Gambier Pioneers announced the signing of Barkley. In mid-March, Barkley arrived in Australia and began playing for Mount Gambier Pioneers.

=== Taiwan Beer ===
On October 15, Barkley was named the fifth pick in the first round of the Super Basketball League foreign player draft by Taiwan Beer, becoming the second pick in the SBL's first foreign player draft. In the 17th SBL season, Barkley averaged 19.1 points, 8.4 rebounds, 3.2 assists, and 1.3 steals per game, and was selected as the Best Foreign Player of the Year and the All-SBL First Team. On January 27, 2022, Taiwan Beer announced that Barkley would return to the team to compete in the second half of the 19th SBL season.

=== Singapore Slingers ===
On October 26, the Singapore Slingers of the ASEAN Basketball League announced the signing of Barkley. Barkley averaged 26 points, 10.8 rebounds, 6 assists, and 2.3 steals per game in the 2023 ABL Invitational Tournament, winning the scoring title.

=== Saigon Heat ===
In June 2023, Barkley joined the Saigon Heat to compete in the Vietnam Basketball Association (VBA). On June 10, Barkley scored 28 points, 16 rebounds, and 10 assists in his VBA debut, becoming the eighth player in VBA to complete the triple-double. On June 18, Barkley once again posted a three-point performance of 24 points, 16 rebounds, and 10 assists, and was named Most Valuable Player.

=== Kesatria Bengawan Solo ===
On December 17, 2023, Barkley joins newly contested team Kesatria Bengawan Solo of the Indonesian Basketball League (IBL). On April 20, Barkley scored his season high of 40 points in a win against Amartha Hangtuah.

=== Blackwater Bossing ===
On June 17, 2026, the Blackwater Bossing tapped the services of Barkley as its import for the 2026 PBA Governors' Cup. In his PBA debut, Barkley notched a triple-double after recording 29 points, 15 rebounds, and 10 assists in a 131–108 victory over the Rain or Shine Elasto Painters.

== Personal life ==
Son of Kenneth Barkley and Barbara Hawley and has a younger brother. His academic major was recreation and leisure studies.
