= Trey Murphy III =

American basketball player (born 2000)

No. 25 – New Orleans Pelicans
- Position: Small forward / power forward
- League: NBA

Personal information
- Born: June 18, 2000 (age 26) Durham, North Carolina, U.S.
- Listed height: 6 ft 9 in (2.06 m)
- Listed weight: 220 lb (100 kg)

Career information
- High school: Cary Academy (Cary, North Carolina)
- College: Rice (2018–2020); Virginia (2020–2021)
- NBA draft: 2021: 1st round, 17th overall pick
- Drafted by: Memphis Grizzlies
- Playing career: 2021–present

Career history
- 2021–present: New Orleans Pelicans
- 2021–2022: →Birmingham Squadron
- Stats at NBA.com
- Stats at Basketball Reference

Kenneth "Trey" Murphy III (born June 18, 2000) is an American professional basketball player for the New Orleans Pelicans of the National Basketball Association (NBA). He played college basketball for the Rice Owls and the Virginia Cavaliers. With Virginia, he became the most recent (as of 2026) Men's NCAA basketball player to post a 50–40–90 season, with a 50–43–93 tally in the 2020–21 season.

== Early life ==
Murphy was born in Durham, North Carolina, to his mother, Albeda, and father, Kenneth Murphy Jr. He played high school basketball at Cary Academy in Cary, North Carolina, where, as a senior, he averaged 24.7 points and 7.4 rebounds per game while shooting 49.4% from the floor. He also shot 43.6% from beyond the three-point line and 85.8% from the free-throw stripe. On October 4, 2017, Murphy committed to playing college basketball for Rice.

Murphy had a notable growth spurt within high school standing 5'8 as a freshman and not reaching 6'4 until his senior year. He continued to grow in university, reaching his current height of 6'8 by the time of his draft.

== College career ==
=== Rice ===
As a freshman, Murphy played in all 32 of Rice's games. He came off the bench 31 times and got to start one game, the first being against Charlotte in March 2019. He averaged 8.4 points and 2.6 rebounds. He ranked fourth in Conference USA (C-USA) in three-point field goal percentage (42.1%) and 14th in 3-pointers made per game (2.0). He also set the school freshman record for three-point field goal percentage (42.1%). On January 26, 2019, Murphy scored a career-high of 24 points and five 3-pointers while going a career-best 6-of-6 from the free-throw line against UAB. As a sophomore, Murphy played in 29 of 32 games for Rice. He started in 23 of those games while coming off the bench in six. He led the Owls in scoring with 13.7 points and recorded 25 double-figure scoring games with two double-doubles. He also led the team with six 20-point games.

=== Virginia ===
On March 30, 2020, Murphy entered the transfer portal, and on April 14, 2020, he transferred to Virginia. North Carolina native and friend Justin McKoy helped recruit him to Virginia. Due to COVID-19 affecting college basketball, Murphy did not have to sit out a year and was granted three years of immediate eligibility instead of two.

Coming off the bench, Murphy scored 21 points while shooting 7-of-9 from the field in the Cavaliers' season opener in Bubbleville. He made his first start against William & Mary in late December 2020 and started the remainder of the season. At this time, NBA scouts saw him as a top 45 draft prospect. As a junior, he averaged 11.3 points and 3.4 rebounds per game. After posting a highly efficient 50–40–90 season under Tony Bennett at Virginia, Murphy declared for the 2021 NBA draft while maintaining his college eligibility. On June 21, 2021, Murphy announced that he signed with an agent, forgoing his remaining eligibility with Virginia and ending his collegiate career.

== Professional career ==
Murphy was selected with the 17th overall pick in the 2021 NBA draft by the Memphis Grizzlies, but was traded to the New Orleans Pelicans. On August 10, 2021, he signed his rookie scale contract with the Pelicans. On October 20, Murphy made his NBA debut, recording six points and two assists in a 117–97 loss to the Philadelphia 76ers. The Pelicans qualified for the postseason for the first time since 2018 and faced the Phoenix Suns during their first round series. Murphy made his playoff debut on April 17, recording six points, four rebounds and two assists in a 110–99 Game 1 loss. The Pelicans ended up losing the series in six games. During his rookie season, Murphy had multiple assignments to the Pelicans' G League affiliate, the Birmingham Squadron.

On February 5, 2023, Murphy scored a then season-high 30 points, alongside four rebounds and two assists, in a 136–104 win over the Sacramento Kings. In February 2023, Murphy was selected to participate in the Slam Dunk Contest at All Star Weekend in Salt Lake City, Utah. He made it to the final round, but was defeated by Mac McClung. On March 12, Murphy put up a season-high and a then career-high 41 points in a 127–110 win over the Portland Trail Blazers. On October 3, 2024, the Pelicans announced that Murphy would miss the start of the regular season due to a right hamstring strain that he suffered during an evening practice at their training camp. On October 21, Murphy signed a four-year, $112 million extension with the Pelicans. He played in 53 games (51 starts) for New Orleans during the season, averaging career-highs in points (21.2), rebounds (5.1), and assists (3.5). On March 17, 2025, it was announced that Murphy would miss the remainder of the season after suffering a torn labrum and partial tear of the rotator cuff in his right shoulder. On January 4, 2026, Murphy made his 693rd career three-pointer and finished with 27 points, eight rebounds, five assists, one steal, and one block in a 125–106 loss to the Miami Heat. He also surpassed CJ McCollum to become the all-time leader in three-pointers made in Pelicans franchise history. On January 6, Murphy put up a then career-high 42 points in a 111–103 loss to the Los Angeles Lakers. From the start of January to the middle of the month, Murphy has averaged 31.6 points, 7.0 rebounds, and 4.1 assists. During January he's had games with 25 points or more on the Miami Heat, Los Angeles Lakers, Washington Wizards, Denver Nuggets, and Brooklyn Nets. On February 4, Murphy put up a career-high 44 points in a 141–137 overtime loss to the Milwaukee Bucks.

== Career statistics ==
Legend
GP	Games played	GS	Games started	MPG	Minutes per game
FG%	Field goal percentage	3P%	3-point field goal percentage	FT%	Free throw percentage
RPG	Rebounds per game	APG	Assists per game	SPG	Steals per game
BPG	Blocks per game	PPG	Points per game	**Bold**	Career high

=== NBA ===
==== Regular season ====
Year	Team	GP	GS	MPG	FG%	3P%	FT%	RPG	APG	SPG	BPG	PPG
2021–22	New Orleans	62	1	13.9	.394	.382	.882	2.4	.6	.4	.1	5.4
2022–23	New Orleans	**79**	65	31.0	**.484**	**.406**	**.905**	3.6	1.4	1.1	.5	14.5
2023–24	New Orleans	57	23	29.7	.443	.380	.815	4.9	2.2	.9	.5	14.8
2024–25	New Orleans	53	51	35.0	.454	.361	.887	5.1	3.5	1.1	**.7**	21.2
2025–26	New Orleans	66	**66**	**35.5**	.470	.379	.886	**5.7**	**3.8**	**1.5**	.4	**21.5**
Career		317	206	29.0	.459	.382	.878	4.3	2.2	1.0	.4	15.4

==== Playoffs ====
Year	Team	GP	GS	MPG	FG%	3P%	FT%	RPG	APG	SPG	BPG	PPG
2022	New Orleans	**6**	0	20.0	**.409**	**.474**	.800	2.5	.5	.5	.2	5.2
2024	New Orleans	4	**4**	**42.0**	.375	.333	—	**6.5**	**2.3**	**1.3**	**1.5**	**11.5**
Career		10	4	28.8	.386	.388	.800	4.1	1.2	.8	.7	7.7

=== College ===
Year	Team	GP	GS	MPG	FG%	3P%	FT%	RPG	APG	SPG	BPG	PPG
2018–19	Rice	**32**	2	20.6	.442	.421	.725	2.6	.7	.5	.5	8.4
2019–20	Rice	29	**23**	**30.2**	.434	.368	.824	**5.5**	**1.2**	**.9**	**.6**	**13.7**
2020–21	Virginia	25	20	29.6	**.503**	**.433**	**.927**	3.4	**1.2**	.8	.4	11.3
Career		86	45	26.4	.455	.401	.819	3.8	1.0	.7	.5	11.0

== Personal life ==
His father, Kenneth, played at East Carolina from 1986 to 1988. Murphy goes by "Trey" because his father goes by "Kenny" and his grandfather goes by "Ken".

== See also ==
- List of NBA single-game 3-point scoring leaders
