= Jabri Abdur-Rahim =

American basketball player (born 2002)

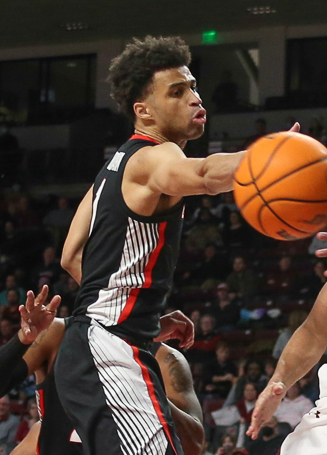
- Abdur-Rahim with Georgia in 2022

No. 23 – Capital City Go-Go
- Position: Small forward
- League: NBA G League

Personal information
- Born: March 22, 2002 (age 24) Mountain View, California, U.S.
- Listed height: 6 ft 8 in (2.03 m)
- Listed weight: 220 lb (100 kg)

Career information
- High school: Seton Hall Prep (West Orange, New Jersey); Blair Academy (Blairstown, New Jersey)
- College: Virginia (2020–2021); Georgia (2021–2024); Providence (2024–2025)
- NBA draft: 2025: undrafted
- Playing career: 2025–present

Career history
- 2025–2026: Oklahoma City Blue
- 2026–present: Capital City Go-Go

Jabri Shareef Abdur-Rahim (born March 22, 2002) is an American basketball player for the Capital City Go-Go of the NBA G League. He played college basketball for the Virginia Cavaliers, Georgia Bulldogs and Providence Friars.

== High school career ==
Abdur-Rahim was raised in the Short Hills section of Millburn, New Jersey. In his freshman season at Seton Hall Preparatory School in West Orange, New Jersey, Abdur-Rahim averaged 11.4 points and 4.2 rebounds per game and was named NJ.com Rookie of the Year. As a sophomore, he averaged 17.7 points and 9.2 rebounds and 2.6 assists per game, leading his team to a 24–3 record and earning All-State Third Team honors. For his junior season, he transferred to Blair Academy in Blairstown, New Jersey. Abdur-Rahim averaged 16.6 points, 7.1 rebounds and 2.4 assists per game as a junior, helping his team achieve a 28–3 record and win the Mid-Atlantic Prep League and the New Jersey Prep A state championship. He was named New Jersey Gatorade Player of the Year and to the All-State First Team. After the season, he had success with the New Jersey Playaz Club at the Nike Elite Youth Basketball League. Abdur-Rahim missed most of his senior season with a foot injury and averaged 31.5 points, five rebounds and four assists in his only two games. He was featured in an episode of Slam magazine's 'Day in the Life' YouTube series in late December 2019. Also, he was selected to play in the Jordan Brand Classic, which was canceled due to the COVID-19 pandemic.

=== Recruiting ===
Abdur-Rahim was considered a four-star recruit, according to major recruiting services. On July 10, 2019, he committed to play college basketball for Virginia over an offers from Michigan, Michigan State, Kansas, Arizona, Auburn, Texas, NC State, USC to name a few. He explained, "I chose them because I felt most comfortable with the staff and I felt they would best prepare me to win on the college level and achieve my ultimate goal of playing in the NBA." Abdur-Rahim signed his letter of intent on December 10, 2019, exactly five months after his commitment to Virginia.

College recruiting
Name	Hometown	School	Height	Weight	Commit date
Jabri Abdur-Rahim; SF / SG	South Orange, NJ	Blair Academy (NJ)	6 ft 6 in (1.98 m)	185 lb (84 kg)	Jul 10, 2019
Jabri Abdur-Rahim; SF / SG	Recruit ratings: Rivals: 247Sports: ESPN: (88)				
Overall recruit ranking: Rivals: 45 247Sports: 38 ESPN: 38
Note: In many cases, Scout, Rivals, 247Sports, On3, and ESPN may conflict in their listings of height and weight.; In these cases, the average was taken. ESPN grades are on a 100-point scale.; Sources: "Virginia 2020 Basketball Commitments". Rivals.; "2020 Virginia Cavaliers Recruiting Class". ESPN.; "2020 Team Ranking". Rivals.

== College career ==
=== Virginia ===
On August 1, 2020, Abdur-Rahim enrolled at UVA. He saw action in 8 games, the first being against Towson in the season opener in Bubbleville. Abdur-Rahim was on the floor for 4 minutes while shooting 1-of-2 from the field and finished with 3 points. Six days later, Abdur-Rahim played in his second game as a Cavalier against St. Francis (PA). He was on the floor for 11 minutes but went 0-of-3 from the field with one assist and one rebound. Abdur-Rahim did not see as much time as he would like to due to the deep bench of the team, and the fact that he was still recovering from his season-ending foot injury from his senior year at Blair Academy. On March 29, 2021, Abdur-Rahim entered the transfer portal, officially ending his tenure as a Cavalier.

=== Georgia ===
On April 12, 2021, Abdur-Rahim announced that he would transfer to Georgia. On May 27, 2021, Georgia and Abdur-Rahim made the transfer official.

In his third season with the Bulldogs, Abdur-Rahim averaged 12.2 points per game and started 27 games.

=== Providence College ===
In April 2024, Abdur-Rahim put his name in the 2024 NBA Draft and the transfer portal. He then committed to Providence College for the 2024–2025 season.

== Professional career ==
On October 25, 2025, Abdur-Rahim was selected 29th overall in 2025 NBA G League draft by the Stockton Kings. He played with the Sacramento Kings in NBA Summer League.

== Career statistics ==
Legend
GP	Games played	GS	Games started	MPG	Minutes per game
FG%	Field goal percentage	3P%	3-point field goal percentage	FT%	Free throw percentage
RPG	Rebounds per game	APG	Assists per game	SPG	Steals per game
BPG	Blocks per game	PPG	Points per game	**Bold**	Career high

=== College ===
Year	Team	GP	GS	MPG	FG%	3P%	FT%	RPG	APG	SPG	BPG	PPG
2020–21	Virginia	8	0	4.6	.200	.143	**1.000**	.3	.3	.1	.1	.9
2021–22	Georgia	**32**	3	18.9	.363	.327	.767	3.2	.4	.4	**.3**	6.9
2022–23	Georgia	**32**	0	18.7	**.400**	**.387**	.818	2.7	.2	.5	**.3**	7.1
2023–24	Georgia	29	**27**	**25.9**	.361	.356	.887	**3.5**	.3	**.8**	**.3**	**12.2**
2024–25	Providence	22	1	16.1	.376	.366	.875	2.6	**.6**	.4	.2	7.2
Career		101	30	19.7	.369	.354	.836	2.9	.3	.5	.3	8.0

== Personal life ==
Abdur-Rahim's father, Shareef, played in the NBA for 12 years and now serves as president of the NBA G League. His uncle, Amir, played college basketball for Southeastern Louisiana before becoming a college coach at the University of South Florida before his death in 2024. Abdur-Rahim has three other uncles who played basketball at the college level.

Abdur-Rahim is often referred to as "#40BallBri", a nickname given to him after he dropped back-to-back 40-point games in a 2019 Nike EYBL summer tournament, the first game being against Cade Cunningham and Greg Brown when Abdur-Rahim played against the Texas Titans Nike EYBL team.
