= Glasgow Kelvin =

Glasgow Kelvin may mean or refer to:

- Glasgow Kelvin (UK Parliament constituency)
- Glasgow Kelvin (Scottish Parliament constituency)
- Glasgow Kelvin College, Further education college in Glasgow
