= 2020–21 Virginia Cavaliers men's basketball team =

American college basketball season

2020–21 Virginia Cavaliers men's basketball

ACC regular season champions

NCAA tournament, first round
- Conference: Atlantic Coast Conference

Ranking
- Coaches: No. 24
- AP: No. 15
- Record: 18–7 (13–4 ACC)
- Head coach: Tony Bennett (12th season)
- Associate head coach: Jason Williford (12th season)
- Assistant coaches: Brad Soderberg (6th season); Orlando Vandross (3rd season)
- Offensive scheme: Blocker-Mover
- Base defense: Pack-Line
- Home arena: John Paul Jones Arena

2020–21 ACC men's basketball standings
	Conf.				Overall
Team	W		L	PCT	W		L	PCT
No. 15 Virginia	13	–	4	.765	18	–	7	.720
No. 14 Florida State	11	–	4	.733	18	–	7	.720
No. 25 Virginia Tech	9	–	4	.692	15	–	7	.682
Georgia Tech †	11	–	6	.647	17	–	9	.654
Clemson	10	–	6	.625	16	–	8	.667
North Carolina	10	–	6	.625	18	–	11	.621
Louisville	8	–	5	.615	13	–	7	.650
Syracuse	9	–	7	.563	18	–	10	.643
NC State	9	–	8	.529	14	–	11	.560
Duke	9	–	9	.500	13	–	11	.542
Notre Dame	7	–	11	.389	11	–	15	.423
Pittsburgh	6	–	10	.375	10	–	12	.455
Miami (FL)	4	–	15	.211	10	–	17	.370
Wake Forest	3	–	15	.167	6	–	16	.273
Boston College	2	–	11	.154	4	–	16	.200
† 2021 ACC tournament winner Rankings from AP poll

The 2020–21 Virginia Cavaliers men's basketball team represented the University of Virginia during the 2020–21 NCAA Division I men's basketball season. The team was led by head coach Tony Bennett in his 12th year and played their home games at John Paul Jones Arena in Charlottesville, Virginia, as members of the Atlantic Coast Conference (ACC). In a season limited by the ongoing COVID-19 pandemic, they finished the season 18–7, 13–4 in ACC play, to win their fifth regular season championship in eight seasons. They defeated Syracuse in the quarterfinals of the ACC tournament before they were forced to withdraw from the tournament due to COVID-19 issues. They received a bid to the NCAA tournament as the No. 4 seed in the West region. They were upset in the first round by Ohio.

== Previous season ==
The Cavaliers finished the 2019–20 season 23–7, 15–5 in ACC play, to finish in a three-way tie for second place. The team was scheduled to play Notre Dame in the quarterfinals of the ACC tournament before the tournament was canceled due to the ongoing COVID-19 pandemic. The NCAA tournament was also later canceled due to the pandemic.

== Offseason ==
=== Departures ===
Virginia departures
	Name	Number	Pos.	Height	Weight	Year	Hometown	Reason for departure
Braxton Key	2	F	6'8"	230	Senior	Charlotte, NC	Graduated	
Mamadi Diakite	25	F	6'9"	224	(redshirt) Senior	Conakry, Guinea	Graduated	

=== Incoming transfers ===
Virginia incoming transfers
Name	Number	Pos.	Height	Weight	Year	Hometown	Previous school	Years remaining	Date eligible
Trey Murphy III	25	F	6'9"	206	Junior	Durham, NC	Rice	3 (Note: Murphy was initially eligible for two years. However, on October 14, 2020, the NCAA granted an additional year of eligibility for all athletes who participate in a winter sport in 2020–21, including basketball.)	October 1, 2020

=== 2020 recruiting class ===
College recruiting information
Name	Hometown	School	Height	Weight	Commit date
Carson McCorkle; SG	Greensboro, NC	Greensboro Day School	6 ft 3 in (1.91 m)	177 lb (80 kg)	Sep 21, 2018
Carson McCorkle; SG	Recruit ratings: Rivals: 247Sports: ESPN: (80)				
Reece Beekman; PG	Baton Rouge, LA	Scotlandville Magnet High School	6 ft 3 in (1.91 m)	168 lb (76 kg)	Jun 13, 2019
Reece Beekman; PG	Recruit ratings: Rivals: 247Sports: ESPN: (86)				
Jabri Abdur-Rahim; SF	South Orange, NJ	Blair Academy	6 ft 7 in (2.01 m)	207 lb (94 kg)	Jul 10, 2019
Jabri Abdur-Rahim; SF	Recruit ratings: Rivals: 247Sports: ESPN: (88)				
Overall recruit ranking: Rivals: 19 247Sports: 19 ESPN: 16
Note: In many cases, Scout, Rivals, 247Sports, On3, and ESPN may conflict in their listings of height and weight.; In these cases, the average was taken. ESPN grades are on a 100-point scale.; Sources: "Virginia 2020 Basketball Commitments". Rivals.; "2020 Virginia Commits". Scout.; "2020 Player Commits". ESPN.; "Scout.com Team Recruiting Rankings". Scout.; "2020 Team Ranking". Rivals.; "Virginia 2020 Basketball Commitments". 247Sports.

== Roster ==
=== Players ===
2020–21 Virginia Cavaliers men's basketball team
Players
Coaches

Pos.	#	Name	Height	Weight	Year	Previous school	Hometown
G	0	Kihei Clark	5 ft 9 in (1.75 m)	160 lb (73 kg)	Jr	Taft Charter	Woodland Hills, CA
G/F	1	Jabri Abdur-Rahim	6 ft 7 in (2.01 m)	214 lb (97 kg)	Fr	Blair Academy	South Orange, NJ
G	2	Reece Beekman	6 ft 3 in (1.91 m)	174 lb (79 kg)	Fr	Scotlandville Magnet	Baton Rouge, LA
F	4	Justin McKoy	6 ft 8 in (2.03 m)	215 lb (98 kg)	So	Panther Creek	Cary, NC
G	5	Jayden Nixon (W)	6 ft 3 in (1.91 m)	187 lb (85 kg)	Jr	Choate Rosemary Hall	Charlottesville, VA
F	10	Sam Hauser	6 ft 8 in (2.03 m)	218 lb (99 kg)	RS Sr	SPASH; Marquette	Stevens Point, WI
G	11	Malachi Poindexter (W)	6 ft 2 in (1.88 m)	193 lb (88 kg)	Fr	St. Anne's-Belfield School	Mineral, VA
G	12	Chase Coleman (W)	5 ft 9 in (1.75 m)	157 lb (71 kg)	So	Maury	Norfolk, VA
G	13	Casey Morsell	6 ft 3 in (1.91 m)	196 lb (89 kg)	So	St. John's College	Fort Washington, MD
F/C	21	Kadin Shedrick	6 ft 11 in (2.11 m)	216 lb (98 kg)	RS Fr	Holly Springs	Raleigh, NC
C	22	Francisco Cáffaro	7 ft 0 in (2.13 m)	250 lb (113 kg)	RS So	NBA Global Academy	Santa Fe, Argentina
G/F	23	Kody Stattmann	6 ft 7 in (2.01 m)	204 lb (93 kg)	Jr	St. Augustine's College	Bentley Park, Australia
F	24	Austin Katstra (W)	6 ft 6 in (1.98 m)	245 lb (111 kg)	Sr	Albemarle	Charlottesville, VA
G/F	25	Trey Murphy III	6 ft 9 in (2.06 m)	206 lb (93 kg)	Jr	Cary Academy; Rice	Durham, NC
F/C	30	Jay Huff	7 ft 1 in (2.16 m)	240 lb (109 kg)	RS Sr	Voyager Academy	Durham, NC
G	33	Carson McCorkle	6 ft 3 in (1.91 m)	184 lb (83 kg)	Fr	Greensboro Day School	Greensboro, NC
G	53	Tomas Woldetensae	6 ft 5 in (1.96 m)	197 lb (89 kg)	Sr	Victory Rock Prep; Indian Hills CC	Bologna, Italy

Head coach

- Tony Bennett

Assistant coach(es)

- Jason Williford
- Brad Soderberg
- Orlando Vandross

Legend

- (C) Team captain
- (S) Suspended
- (I) Ineligible
- (W) Walk-on
- Injured
- Current redshirt

Roster
Last update: August 2, 2020

=== Coaching staff ===
Virginia coaching staff
Name	Position	Year with position	Year on coaching staff	Alma mater
Tony Bennett	Head coach	12	12	UW-Green Bay
Jason Williford	Associate head coach	3	12	Virginia
Brad Soderberg	Assistant coach	6	6	UW-Stevens Point
Orlando Vandross	Assistant coach	3	6	American International
Kyle Getter	Director of recruiting/player development	3	3	Hanover
Larry Mangino	Director of scouting/recruiting	5	5	Montclair State
Johnny Carpenter	Director of player personnel	3	6	Virginia
Mike Curtis	Strength and conditioning coach	12	12	Virginia
Ethan Saliba	Head athletic trainer	23	38	Kansas
Ronnie Wideman	Associate AD for basketball administration/operations	11	12	Washington State

=== Depth chart ===
Pos.	Starting 5	Bench 1	Bench 2	Bench 3
C	Jay Huff		Francisco Caffaro	Austin Katstra
PF	Trey Murphy III	Justin McKoy	Kadin Shedrick	Jayden Nixon
SF	Sam Hauser	Tomas Woldetensae	Kody Stattmann	Carson McCorkle
SG	Reece Beekman	Casey Morsell	Jabri Abdur-Rahim	Malachi Poindexter
PG	Kihei Clark			Chase Coleman

== Schedule and results ==
Along with Kansas, UCLA and Georgetown, UVA was supposed to play in the early-season Wooden Legacy in Anaheim, California, but withdrew due to COVID-19.

Games that were canceled due to COVID-19 issues include:

- (11/25/20) vs. Maine (Bubbleville)
- (11/27/20) vs. Florida (Bubbleville)
- (12/9/20) Michigan State (ACC–B1G Challenge)
- (12/16/20) at Wake Forest
- (12/19/20) vs. Villanova (Holiday Hoops Classic)
- (1/2/21) Virginia Tech (Commonwealth Clash)
- (2/6/21) Louisville
- (3/12/21) vs. Georgia Tech (ACC tournament)

Date time, TV	Rank^{#}	Opponent^{#}	Result	Record	High points	High rebounds	High assists	Site (attendance) city, state
Non-conference regular season
November 25, 2020*; 1:30 pm, FloHoops	No. 4	vs. Towson; Bubbleville	W 89–54	1–0	21 – Murphy III	8 – Hauser	3 – tied	Mohegan Sun Arena (0); Uncasville, CT
November 27, 2020*; 11:30 am, ESPN	No. 4	vs. San Francisco; HomeLight Classic	L 60–61	1–1	11 – tied	7 – Huff	2 – Clark	Mohegan Sun Arena (0); Uncasville, CT
December 1, 2020*; 4:00 pm, ACCN	No. 15	Saint Francis	W 76–51	2–1	13 – Huff	8 – Shedrick	4 – tied	John Paul Jones Arena (250); Charlottesville, VA
December 4, 2020*; 6:00 pm, ACCN	No. 15	Kent State	W 71–64 ^{OT}	3–1	18 – tied	11 – Huff	4 – Hauser	John Paul Jones Arena (250); Charlottesville, VA
December 22, 2020*; 2:00 pm, ACCN	No. 16	William & Mary; Makeup from Dec. 13 postponement	W 76–40	4–1	15 – Murphy III	7 – Shedrick	4 – tied	John Paul Jones Arena (250); Charlottesville, VA
December 26, 2020*; 4:00 pm, CBS	No. 16	vs. No. 1 Gonzaga	L 75–98	4–2	19 – Clark	6 – Huff	4 – tied	Dickies Arena (2,795); Fort Worth, TX
ACC regular season
December 30, 2020; 6:00 pm, ACCN	No. 23	at Notre Dame	W 66–57	5–2 (1–0)	19 – Clark	10 – Hauser	5 – Clark	Purcell Pavilion (86); South Bend, IN
January 6, 2021; 9:00 pm, ACCRSN	No. 22	Wake Forest	W 70–61	6–2 (2–0)	16 – Hauser	11 – Hauser	3 – tied	John Paul Jones Arena (250); Charlottesville, VA
January 9, 2021; 2:00 pm, ACCN	No. 22	at Boston College	W 61–49	7–2 (3–0)	18 – Huff	10 – Hauser	3 – tied	Conte Forum (0); Chestnut Hill, MA
January 13, 2021; 4:30 pm, ACCN	No. 18	Notre Dame	W 80–68	8–2 (4–0)	18 – Huff	9 – Hauser	6 – Clark	John Paul Jones Arena (250); Charlottesville, VA
January 16, 2021; 6:00 pm, ESPN	No. 18	at No. 12 Clemson	W 85–50	9–2 (5–0)	14 – tied	8 – Hauser	6 – Beekman	Littlejohn Coliseum (1,876); Clemson, SC
January 23, 2021; 8:00 pm, ACCN	No. 13	Georgia Tech	W 64–62	10–2 (6–0)	22 – Hauser	6 – Hauser	8 – Clark	John Paul Jones Arena (250); Charlottesville, VA
January 25, 2021; 7:00 pm, ESPN	No. 8	Syracuse	W 81–58	11–2 (7–0)	21 – tied	12 – Huff	9 – Clark	John Paul Jones Arena (250); Charlottesville, VA
January 30, 2021; 6:00 pm, ACCN	No. 8	at No. 20 Virginia Tech; Commonwealth Clash	L 51–65	11–3 (7–1)	13 – Huff	6 – Murphy III	3 – Beekman	Cassell Coliseum (250); Blacksburg, VA
February 3, 2021; 9:00 pm, ACCN	No. 14	at NC State	W 64–57	12–3 (8–1)	18 – tied	6 – Huff	6 – Clark	PNC Arena (25); Raleigh, NC
February 6, 2021; 4:00 pm, ESPN	No. 14	Pittsburgh	W 73–66	13–3 (9–1)	23 – Hauser	8 – Huff	8 – Clark	John Paul Jones Arena (250); Charlottesville, VA
February 10, 2021; 7:00 pm, ACCRSN	No. 9	at Georgia Tech	W 57–49	14–3 (10–1)	18 – Murphy III	10 – Hauser	6 – Clark	McCamish Pavilion (1,200); Atlanta, GA
February 13, 2021; 6:00 pm, ESPN	No. 9	North Carolina	W 60–48	15–3 (11–1)	18 – Huff	12 – Huff	7 – Beekman	John Paul Jones Arena (250); Charlottesville, VA
February 15, 2021; 7:00 pm, ESPN	No. 7	at No. 16 Florida State	L 60–81	15–4 (11–2)	13 – Murphy III	5 – tied	4 – Clark	Donald L. Tucker Center (2,950); Tallahassee, FL
February 20, 2021; 8:00 pm, ESPN	No. 7	at Duke	L 65–66	15–5 (11–3)	20 – Huff	12 – Huff	3 – Hauser	Cameron Indoor Stadium (0); Durham, NC
February 24, 2021; 6:30 p.m., ACCN	No. 15	NC State; Makeup from Jan. 20 postponement	L 61–68	15–6 (11–4)	21 – Hauser	11 – Huff	7 – Clark	John Paul Jones Arena (0); Charlottesville, VA
March 1, 2021; 6:00 pm, ACCN	No. 21	Miami; Senior Night	W 62–51	16–6 (12–4)	18 – Hauser	7 – Huff	5 – Clark	John Paul Jones Arena (0); Charlottesville, VA
March 6, 2021; 4:00 pm, ESPN2	No. 21	at Louisville	W 68–58	17–6 (13–4)	24 – Hauser	8 – Hauser	4 – Beekman	KFC Yum! Center (4,812); Louisville, KY
ACC tournament
March 11, 2021; 12:00 pm, ESPN2	(1) No. 16	vs. (8) Syracuse; Quarterfinals	W 72–69	18–6	21 – Hauser	12 – Huff	6 – Clark	Greensboro Coliseum (2,820); Greensboro, NC
March 12, 2021; 6:30 pm, ESPN2	(1) No. 16	vs. (4) Georgia Tech; Semifinals	Withdrew from tournament due to COVID-19 positive test					Greensboro Coliseum; Greensboro, NC
NCAA tournament
March 20, 2021; 7:15 pm, truTV	(4 W) No. 15	vs. (13 W) Ohio; First round	L 58–62	18–7	15 – Hauser	9 – Hauser	3 – tied	Simon Skjodt Assembly Hall; Bloomington, IN
*Non-conference game. ^{#}Rankings from AP poll. (#) Tournament seedings in parentheses. W=West. All times are in Eastern Time.

== Rankings ==
Ranking movements Legend: ██ Increase in ranking ██ Decrease in ranking т = Tied with team above or below ( ) = First-place votes
	Week																	
Poll	Pre	1	2	3	4	5	6	7	8	9	10	11	12	13	14	15	16	Final
AP	4 (1)	15	18	17	16	23	22	18	13	8	14	9	7	15	21	16	15	Not released
Coaches	4	4^	18	16	15	24т	21	22	12	8	15	9	8	14	20	15	15	24

^Coaches did not release a Week 1 poll.
