= Cardonald (disambiguation) =

Cardonald is a district of Glasgow.

Cardonald can also refer to:

- Cardonald College
- Cardonald railway station
