= Re-Engineering Assessment Practices =

The Re-Engineering Assessment Practices in Scottish Higher Education project, or REAP, is one of six projects funded under the Scottish Funding Council's E-learning Transformation Programme. The project is piloting improved models of assessment across three universities - the University of Strathclyde, Glasgow Caledonian University and the University of Glasgow.

== Project vision ==
In the REAP project, assessment is defined broadly to include tutor, peer and self-assessment processes. The goal is to develop new models of assessment geared to fostering lifelong learning skills. The vision is that, over the course of an undergraduate degree, students should develop their own capacity to self-assess, reflect on, and take an active role in managing their own learning. New technologies can help support the development of learner self-regulation (See Self-regulated learning).

== Educational research ==
Assessment is a key driver of student learning (See Student-centred learning); it determines both how and what students study. Yet, research shows that prevailing modes of assessment often promote high teacher workloads rather than enhanced student learning. There is a need to rethink institutional assessment systems - away from a model where teachers transmit marks, to one where students develop, over the course of a degree, their own ability to self-assess and self-correct.

The educational basis for the REAP project is recent research on assessment. Black and William (1998) carried out a meta-analysis of research on formative assessment, over a 10-year period, across the schools and HE sectors. They showed that where assessments focused on generating feedback and encouraging its use the learning gains were 'among the largest ever reported for educational interventions'. Other researchers have shown how formative assessment and feedback might support the development of learner self-regulation (Nicol and Macfarlane-Dick 2006). Still others have shown how assessment might be used to engage students in active learning over the course of their studies (Gibbs and Simpson, 2004) or might simultaneously enhance both immediate and lifelong learning needs (Boud, 2000). Despite these recent publications, this research has had little impact on HE practices. The current project will address this gap by drawing on current thinking and on the potential available through new technologies (Nicol & Milligan, 2006).

== Project activities ==
The REAP project involves the re-engineering of assessment practices in large enrolment first year classes across a range of departments/disciplines. A portfolio of technologies will be piloted to support assessment re-engineering including virtual learning environments (VLEs), e-Portfolios (See electronic portfolio), personal response systems, computer simulations and new communication tools.

== Benefits to Higher Education sector ==
- Case exemplars of innovative assessment practices including evidence of the learning and efficiency benefits across a range of disciplines.
- Records of the change management processes (See Change management process) engaged in by departments and faculties as they re-engineered their own assessment policies and practices.
- Analysis of changes required in organisational, management, human and technological processes within institutions in order to sustain improved assessment practices.

== Key members of REAP ==
- Professor David Nicol – Project Director
- Ms Catherine Owen – Project Manager
- Dr Gillian Roberts – Project Co-ordinator at GCU
- Dr Steve Draper - Project Co-ordinator at GU
