= Scottish Aquaculture Innovation Centre =

The Scottish Aquaculture Innovation Centre (SAIC) was set up in 2014, funded by the Scottish Funding Council, Scottish Enterprise, and Highlands and Islands Enterprise, with funding matched by the industry. It is hosted by the University of Stirling.

== Aquaculture and Scotland ==
Aquaculture is a “pillar of rural industry in Scotland”, according to the Scottish Government, contributing as much as £1.4 billion turnover and 8,000 jobs to Scotland. Its industry and academic researchers also contribute to Scotland's reputation abroad. The main activities within the sector are the farming / culturing of fish, molluscs, crustaceans and seaweed, much of them in the seas west of Scotland and north of Scotland.

Salmon dominates the sector, and Scotland is the largest producer in the EU and the third largest globally. Current annual production of salmon in Scotland is about 160,000 tonnes, generating global retail sales of more than £1 billion. Fresh salmon is exported to over 50 countries, with the US the main export market for fresh whole salmon in 2013, followed by France.

SAIC has identified four Priority Innovation Actions for its first year of operations: • Improved sea lice control in Scottish aquaculture • Alternative sustainable feeds for finfish • Rapid detection methods for viral pathogens and diseases • Development of secure health-certified Scottish mollusc spat production systems.

Scotland and its rural communities could benefit greatly from action in these areas. It is estimated that each additional 10,000 tonnes of salmon creates an additional £96 million for the Scottish economy, of which over £43 million is at the farm gate.

== History and structure of SAIC ==
The Scottish Aquaculture Innovation Centre was launched by the Scottish Government's Minister for Environment and Climate Change, Paul Wheelhouse, at the Royal Highland Show at Ingliston in 2014. Its Chair is Jack Perry, a former CEO of Scottish Enterprise, and its CEO is Heather Jones.

One of its first actions was to secure £1.7 million funding for state-of-the-art equipment to help address key issues in the industry. The equipment will be installed at higher education institutions across Scotland, including the University of St Andrews, University of the Highlands and Islands, University of Aberdeen and University of Stirling.

SAIC is one of eight Innovation Centres funded by the Scottish Funding Council, which is investing up to £110 million in core funding over five years. In addition to the Scottish Aquaculture Innovation Centre, they include: the Innovation Centre for Sensors and Imaging Systems (CENSIS); Digital Health Institute (DHI); Oil & Gas Innovation Centre (OGIC); and Stratified Medicine Scotland Innovation Centre (SMS-IC).

== See also ==
- Marine Scotland
- Scottish Funding Council
- Aquaculture in the United Kingdom
