= John Wheatley College =

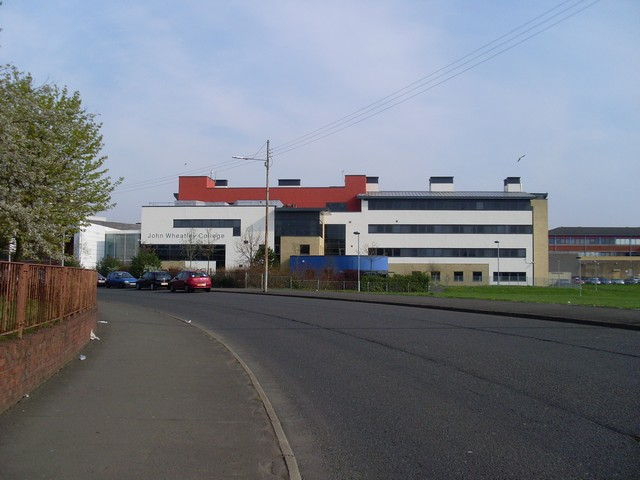
- Type: College of Further Education
- Active: 1989–2013
- Principal: Alan Sherry at closure
- Location: Glasgow, Scotland
- Campus: Glasgow
- Website: http://www.jwheatley.ac.uk/

John Wheatley College was founded in 1989 and had its main campuses in Shettleston, Easterhouse and Haghill in Glasgow.

The college originally opened in 1989 within the former main building of Eastbank Academy (which had moved to a brand new building in 1986) supporting learning throughout the communities of east Glasgow, working in partnership with Glasgow City Council's community planning teams, with Glasgow Regeneration Agency and Glasgow Life, with local housing associations and voluntary organisations to provide neighbourhood learning centres connected to the wireless Glasgow East Learning Network, the twin hubs for which were its main campuses. The opening of the Haghill Campus in 2007 meant the closure of the Shettleston Campus, the former Eastbank Academy buildings now being used as office space, named Academy House.

John Wheatley College provided courses in construction, hospitality, care, creative industries, art and computing, and provided outreach courses for adults across the Glasgow East Learning Network. It also ran a significant youth programme in the networked learning centres, and at the Bridge in Easterhouse, in partnership with voluntary and statutory youth work providers, supported by both the Glasgow City Council and Glasgow Housing Association.

The college also supported people recently arrived in Glasgow who spoke English as a second language.

The college merged with Stow College and North Glasgow College on 1 November 2013 to form Glasgow Kelvin College.

== Locations ==
- Easterhouse 55°52′06″N 4°07′02″W
- Haghill 55°51′29″N 4°12′08″W

== See also ==
- List of further and higher education colleges in Scotland
