= Glasgow Colleges' Regional Board =

The Glasgow Colleges' Regional Board (GCRB) is a regional strategic body for colleges in Glasgow, Scotland, established in May 2014 under the Post-16 Education (Scotland) Act. The colleges assigned to it are City of Glasgow College, Glasgow Clyde College, and Glasgow Kelvin College.

The Board's original chair Henry McLeish was appointed for four years in May 2014 but resigned in May 2015. Ali Jarvis was appointed interim chair in his place.
