= Anniesland College =

Further education college in Glasgow, Scotland

Coordinates: 55.88605°N 4.32003°W

- Type: College of Further Education
- Established: 1964
- Principal: Linda McTavish
- Location: Glasgow, Scotland
- Campus: Glasgow
- Colours: Pink, silver and white
- Website: www.glasgowclyde.ac.uk/locations/anniesland-campus

Anniesland College was a small, local further education college in the Anniesland area of Glasgow, Scotland, established in 1964.

The college had seven schools, offering a range of courses and levels of study, full-time, part-time or flexibly. Their new building at Hatfield Drive opened in 2010.

== Merger ==
On 17 November 2011, Cardonald College announced it had entered merger talks with Anniesland College and on 28 March 2012 it was announced by Cardonald College principal, Susan Walsh, that a merger with Cardonald College, Anniesland College and Langside College was "highly likely."

On 30 July 2012, the colleges agreed to push ahead with merger plans and named The Guardian reporter and Cardonald College journalism lecturer, Kirsty Scott, the Merger Communications Manager. On 28 August 2012, a formal consultation was launched and ran until 16 November 2012.

On 14 December 2012, Cardonald College principal Susan Walsh was appointed principal of the new college.

On 1 August 2013, Anniesland College, along with Cardonald College and Langside College, were absorbed to form Glasgow Clyde College. As a result of the merger, Anniesland College became Glasgow Clyde College Anniesland Campus.

== See also ==
- Glasgow Clyde College
- List of further and higher education colleges in Scotland
