= North Glasgow College =

Coordinates: 55.880°N 4.228°W

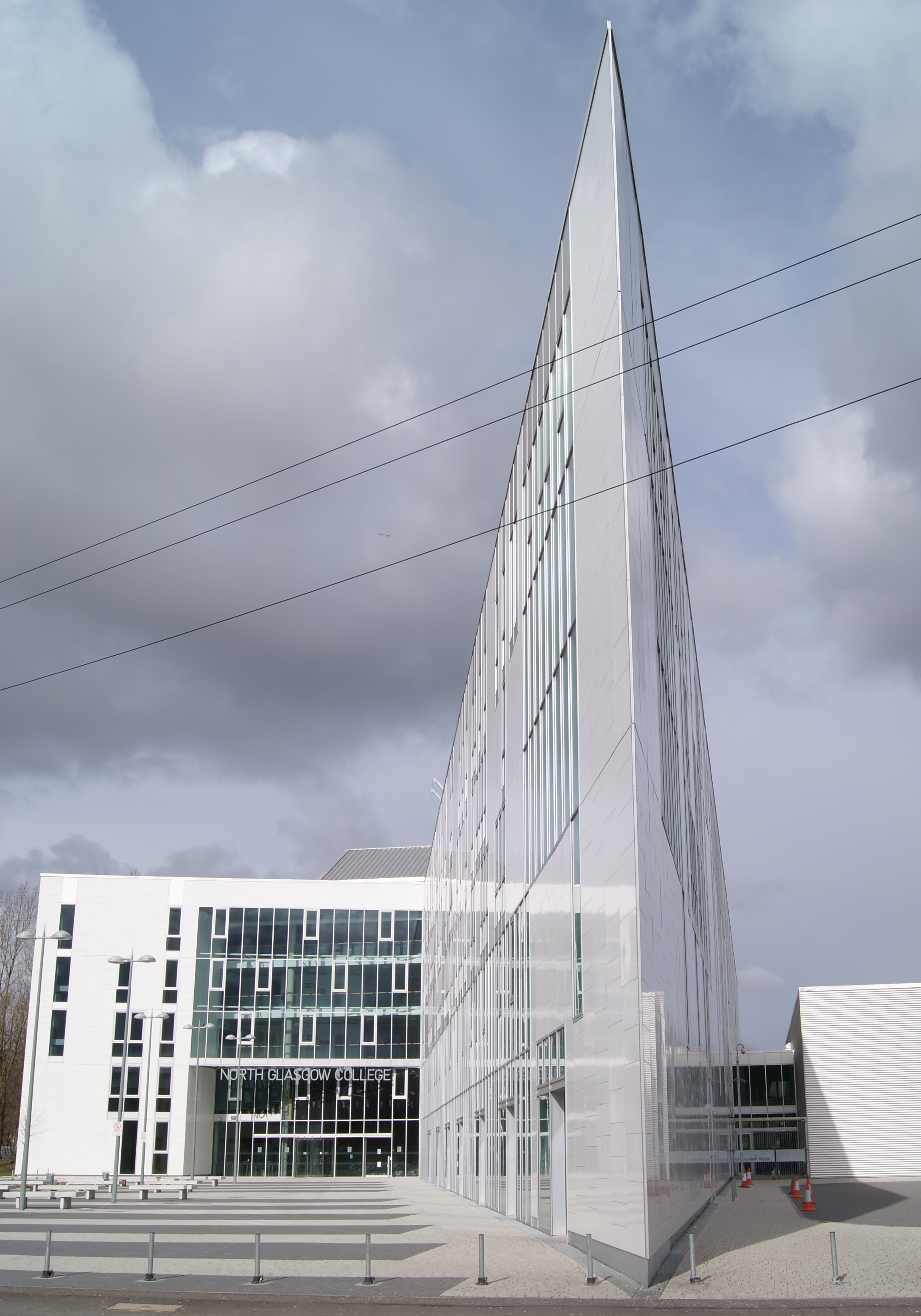
- Type: College of Further Education
- Active: 1965 (Springburn College of Engineering)–2013
- Location: Glasgow, Scotland
- Campus: Glasgow
- Website: http://www.northglasgowcollege.ac.uk/

North Glasgow College was a college located at Springburn in Glasgow and was one of the main providers of further education in the city. Due to financial difficulties experienced by the North British Locomotive Company in 1961, the main administration building of the company on Flemington Street was sold to Glasgow Corporation for use as an annexe of Stow College, until becoming Springburn College of Engineering in 1965 and later Springburn College in 1981. Its primary role was the teaching of engineering apprentices. The college merged with Barmulloch College in 1990, being renamed North Glasgow College. The new combined college remained located in the former headquarters of the North British Locomotive Company but in early 2009 moved to a new purpose built campus opposite, on the site of the former NBL Hyde Park railway works. The new college building won a Royal Institute of British Architects Award for its design in 2009.

The college merged with Stow College and John Wheatley College on 1 November 2013 to form Glasgow Kelvin College.

== See also ==
- List of further education colleges in Scotland
