= Eastbank Academy =

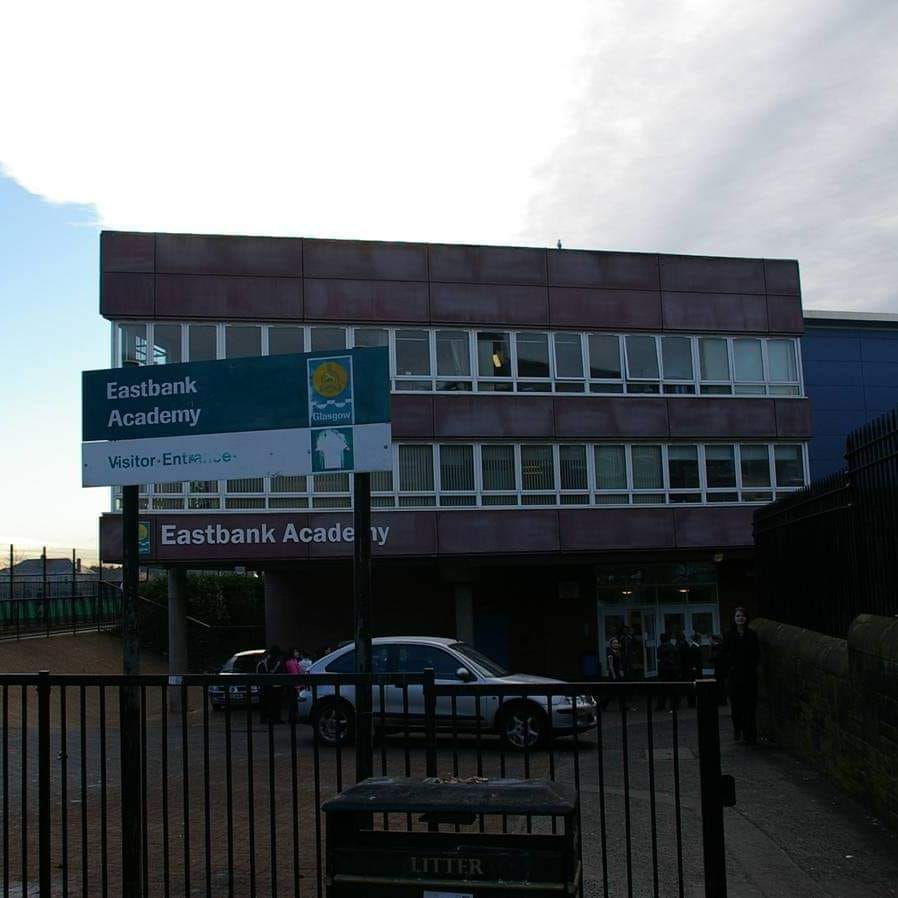
- The north elevation of the 1986 building of Eastbank Academy

Location
- 26 Academy Street; Glasgow, G32 9AA; Scotland; 55.8504°N 4.1631°W

Information
- Type: Secondary; Primary (1901–1935)
- Motto: Splendeat Lux (Let your light shine so that others may see your good work)
- Religious affiliation: Non-denominational
- Established: 1894
- Local authority: Glasgow City Council
- Age: 11 to 18
- Enrolment: 860 (2019)
- Language: English
- Colours: Black, gold
- Website: eastbankacademy.co.uk

Eastbank Academy is a Scottish secondary school in the suburb of Shettleston in Glasgow, Scotland.

Today the institution is a non-denominational comprehensive school, and its catchment area includes Shettleston, Tollcross, Sandyhills, Mount Vernon, Springboig and Barlanark.

Pupils from the neighbouring areas of Carntyne, Parkhead and Garrowhill also make up a small proportion of its roll.

== History ==
The school was founded in 1894 originally as a senior secondary or Academy, before the abolition of the two-tier system of junior and senior secondaries in the mid-1930s.

When constructed in 1894, the grand red sandstone building located on Main Street (now Shettleston Road) was thought to be "too grand" for the tiny village of Shettleston, which at the time was separate from Glasgow. The building had been proposed by Dr Alexander Scott of the Shettleston School Board in the late 1880s and for many years had been known as "Scott's Folly" by the local population. The roll of the school quickly grew over the years, and required the construction of an annex building in 1911, which housed primary education until 1936, as the school grew again to become a comprehensive school following the merger with the former Wellshot Junior Secondary; which required the construction of various pre-fabricated structures to house practical departments, which would remain in place until the mid-1980s when the current complex of buildings was constructed.

Around this time, Eastbank Primary School was established as a separate institution, but remained a part of the academy's campus (occupying the pre-fabs) until 1968 and the construction of its own dedicated building on nearby Gartocher Road. Although now operationally separate, the two Eastbanks retain their affiliation, sharing the same badge, colours and motto; the primary school being one of Eastbank Academy's six feeder primaries.

The original 1894 and 1911 buildings had become increasingly inadequate over the decades, and the pre-fabricated practical and former primary-school buildings had also deteriorated into a state of serious disrepair. As part of the GEAR (Glasgow Eastern Area Renewal) initiative in partnership with Strathclyde Regional Council (SRC), a brand new building costing £4.5M was proposed, to be sited on the south of the school campus. Construction began in April 1983 with the demolition of the former kitchen/dining block and the building was officially handed over to the school in Christmas 1985, with the first pupils entering the building the following January. At the time state-of-the-art, the new Eastbank Academy building was noted for its open plan design, with science and practical departments being designed as large open plan workshops as opposed to individual classrooms.

The old 1894 building was extended, refurbished and redeveloped in 1989 into a home for John Wheatley College, whilst the 1901 Annex building was acquired by Greater Glasgow Health Board in 1995. Consolidation of Glasgow's secondary school portfolio in the late 1990s led to the former John Street secondary being closed, and Eastbank's catchment area increased once again. With the need to accommodate an expanded roll, the 1986 building was substantially extended and remodelled, with the alterations officially completed in 2002.

Following John Wheatley College's move to a new purpose-built campus in the Haghill area in 2007, the original 1894 building of Eastbank Academy is now used a rentable office space and a base for community organisations.

== Motto ==
The school's motto, Splendeat Lux, is a contraction of the Latin phrase Splendeat Lux Vestra which, when taken from Matthew Chapter 5, Verse 16 (the Sermon on the Mount), translates literally as "Let your light so shine before men that they may see your good works."

== Head teachers ==
To date, Eastbank Academy has had 18 head teachers. The longest serving being Jim Dalziel, holding the office for almost 27 years, who in 1995 overtook the previous holder of the title - William Farquhason - who was in office for 10 years between 1931 and 1941. The shortest incumbent being John McFarlane (1945–47). John Wilson is to date the only Eastbank head teacher to die in office in 1973.

- Duncan Rodger (1894–1911)
- William Reid (1911–1923)
- R. R Agnew (1924–1927
- James Lucas (1927–1931)
- William Farquharson (1931–1941)
- David Carson (1941–1945)
- John McFarlane (1945–1947)
- James Paterson (1947–1949)
- James Stothers (1949–1954)
- William H. Brown (1954–1958)
- James McGrother (1958–1965)
- James Whyte (1965–1969)
- John Wilson (1969–1973)
- George B. P. Smith (1973–1976)
- Ian McAllister (1976–1984)
- James Dalziel (1984–2011)
- Gordon Shaw (2011–2019)
- Jonathan Graham (2019– )

== Notable alumni ==
- Junior Campbell (William Campbell), lead guitarist, singer and songwriter with the sixties band The Marmalade; known for writing the music for the original Thomas the Tank Engine and Friends television series and films
- Neil Carmichael, Labour Party politician
- Cliff Hanley, broadcaster and lyricist of the Scottish anthem Scotland the Brave
- Thomas Kerr (born 1996), Scottish politician
- Angus Lennie, actor
- Cameron McKenna, Scottish television announcer, Daybreak Scotland news presenter and current BBC One Scotland announcer
- Janey Godley, Scottish stand-up comedian, actress, writer and political activist
- Thomas Renfrew, HM Chief Inspector of Constabulary for Scotland from 1957 to 1966
- Charles Wilson, journalist; editor of The Times from 1985 to 1990; managing director of Mirror Group Newspapers plc. from 1992 to 1998
