= Langside College =

College in Glasgow, Scotland

Coordinates: 55°49′35″N 4°15′49″W

Langside College was a further and higher education college located in the Mount Florida / Battlefield region of Glasgow.

== History ==
It was established in 1947 and in the first decade of the 20th century enrolled over 5,000 students every year, many of whom came from countries outwith the European Union (EU). The college operated in two main campuses and in over 80 community based venues spanning much of the South side of Glasgow, including at Rutherglen, Govanhill, Castlemilk and Toryglen.

Phase 1 of a newly built main campus was opened in May 2009 while Phase 2, incorporating new sport, music and drama facilities, opened in August 2010. The final phase - an outdoor sports facility - was completed in February 2011. Prior to this, its Category B-listed original main building nearby (built as the Glasgow Deaf and Dumb Institution in 1868) was sold to be converted into apartments as 'Chroma House'.

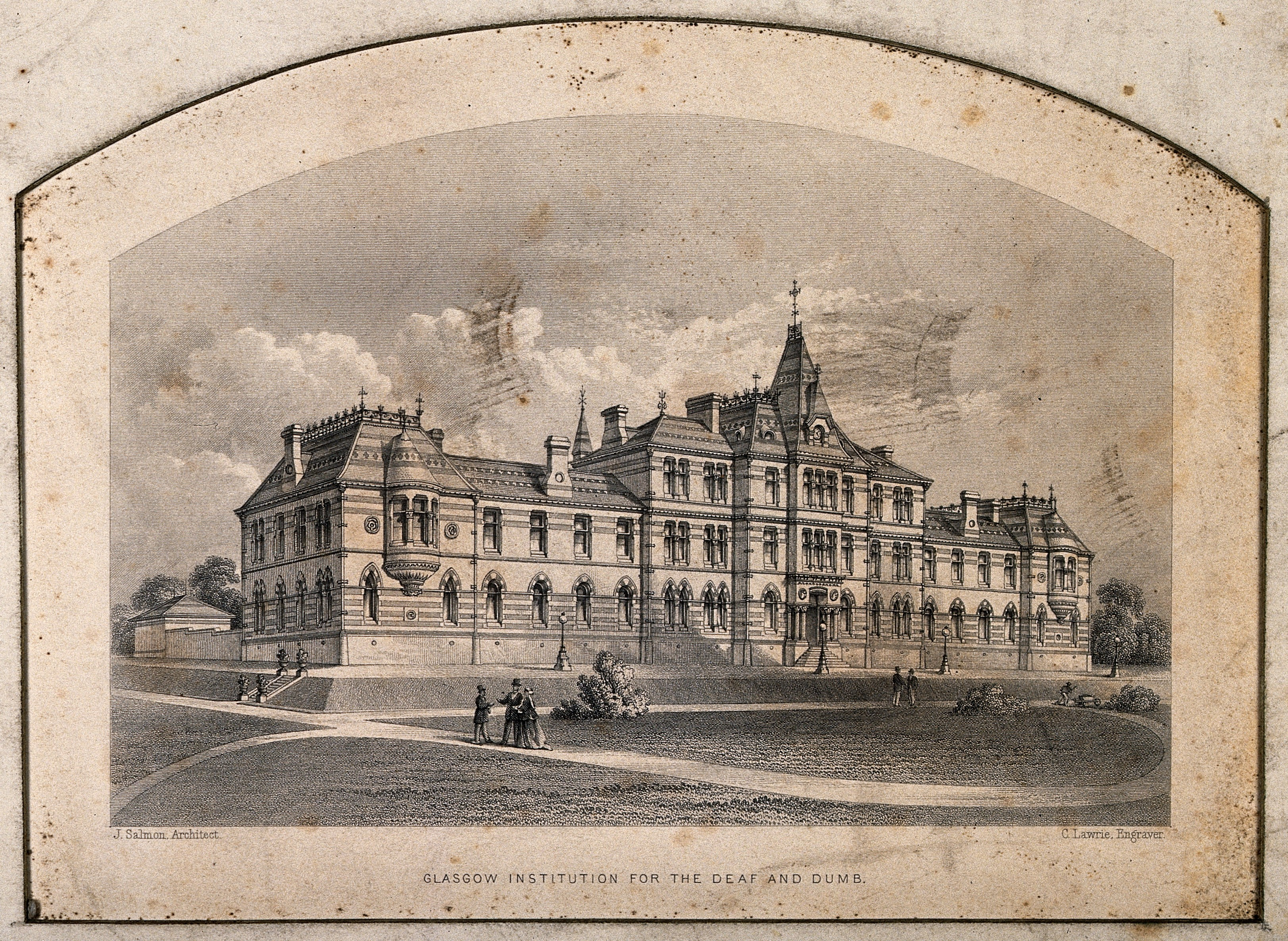
The Glasgow Institution for the Deaf and Dumb

== Mergers ==
Langside College first entered merger talks with Cardonald College and Anniesland College in January 2012. On 28 August 2012 a formal consultation was launched and ran until 16 November 2012.

On 14 December 2012, Cardonald College principal Susan Walsh was appointed principal of the new college.

On 1 August 2013, Langside College, along with Anniesland College and Cardonald College, were absorbed to form Glasgow Clyde College. As a result of the merger, Langside College became Glasgow Clyde College Langside Campus.

The main campus is located very close to Mount Florida railway station and has its own access entrance to the station during daytime hours. There are also several nearby bus routes via Battlefield Road and Cathcart Road.

== Notable alumni ==
- William Haughey, Baron Haughey, Scottish businessman and philanthropist.
- Iain De Caestecker, Scottish actor.
- Frankie Boyle, Scottish comedian
- Courtney Stewart, professional wrestler known as Isla Dawn.

== See also ==
- Glasgow Clyde College
