= Coatbridge College =

Further education college in Scotland

Coordinates: 55.8646°N 4.0166°W

New College Lanarkshire Coatbridge Campus, previously the independent Coatbridge College, was Scotland’s oldest further education college, founded in 1865. The college has over 250 staff members and approximately 7,000 students. The college provides further education to students.

In the 1970s, Coatbridge College moved away from traditional heavy industries to a commerce-focused college. In 1984, the college was extended to create computing suites, hairdressing and beauty salons, a refectory area, sports facilities and a large theatre, which was later named the Ian Bannen Theatre.

In 2013, there was a proposal to merge Coatbridge College with other further education colleges in North Lanarkshire, but Coatbridge pulled out. However, the merger into New College Lanarkshire (with the former Motherwell College and Cumbernauld College) took place the following year.

== Campuses ==
The college is currently split over three campuses. The Kildonan Street Campus is the College’s main campus, offering eight out of ten subject areas. The Greenhills Campus is home to the Automotive and Transport Department, with The School of Dental Studies based at the Duart House Campus at Strathclyde Business Park. The Kildonan campus has a library, two internet cafes, a student lounge and two cafes.

== Curriculum ==
The college currently offers study within 10 curriculum subject areas, including:

- Automotive and Transport
- Beauty, Spa and Holistic Therapies
- Business and Management
- Computing and Creative Technologies
- The School of Dental Studies
- Early Education and Childcare
- Hairdressing and Make-up Artistry
- Health and Social Care
- Performing Arts
- Science

== Estate redevelopment ==
In June 2009, the college underwent a redevelopment of its Kildonan Street Campus. Phase 1 included a £22.5 million refurbishment of the college’s south building to improve facilities and provide disabled access, funded by the Scottish Funding Council. The project was completed on schedule in April 2011.
