= Gazelle Group =

The Gazelle Group (also known as Gazelle Colleges or Gazelle Colleges Group) was an association of United Kingdom further education colleges which claimed to promote entrepreneurship. It has been widely criticised for its accounting practices. To date, no one has been held accountable for the failures of the organisation. It was founded in 2011 or January 2012.

A report in FE Week in January 2017 reported that only six colleges remained in the group and that its executive director had left, and described the group as "on its last legs". As of 2024, Companies House records that the Gazelle Colleges Group was a company registered in 2016 and which was "dissolved via voluntary strike-off " in 2021.

== Members ==
There were 22 member colleges as of April 2014:

=== England ===
- Amersham & Wycombe College, Buckinghamshire
- Barking and Dagenham College, London
- Carlisle College, Cumbria
- City College Norwich, Norfolk
- City College Plymouth, Devon
- City of Bath College, Somerset
- The City of Liverpool College, Merseyside
- Gateshead College, Tyne and Wear
- Gloucestershire College, Gloucestershire
- Highbury College, Portsmouth
- LeSoCo: Lewisham College, incorporating Southwark College, London
- Middlesbrough College, Middlesbrough
- New College Nottingham, Nottinghamshire
- North Hertfordshire College, Hertfordshire
- Oxford and Cherwell Valley College, Oxfordshire
- Peterborough Regional College, Cambridgeshire
- Preston's College, Lancashire
- The Sheffield College, South Yorkshire
- Warwickshire College
- Walsall College, West Midlands

=== Northern Ireland ===
- South West College

=== Scotland ===
- Glasgow Kelvin College

=== Wales ===
- Cardiff and Vale College
