= Tomas Woldetensae =

Italian basketball player

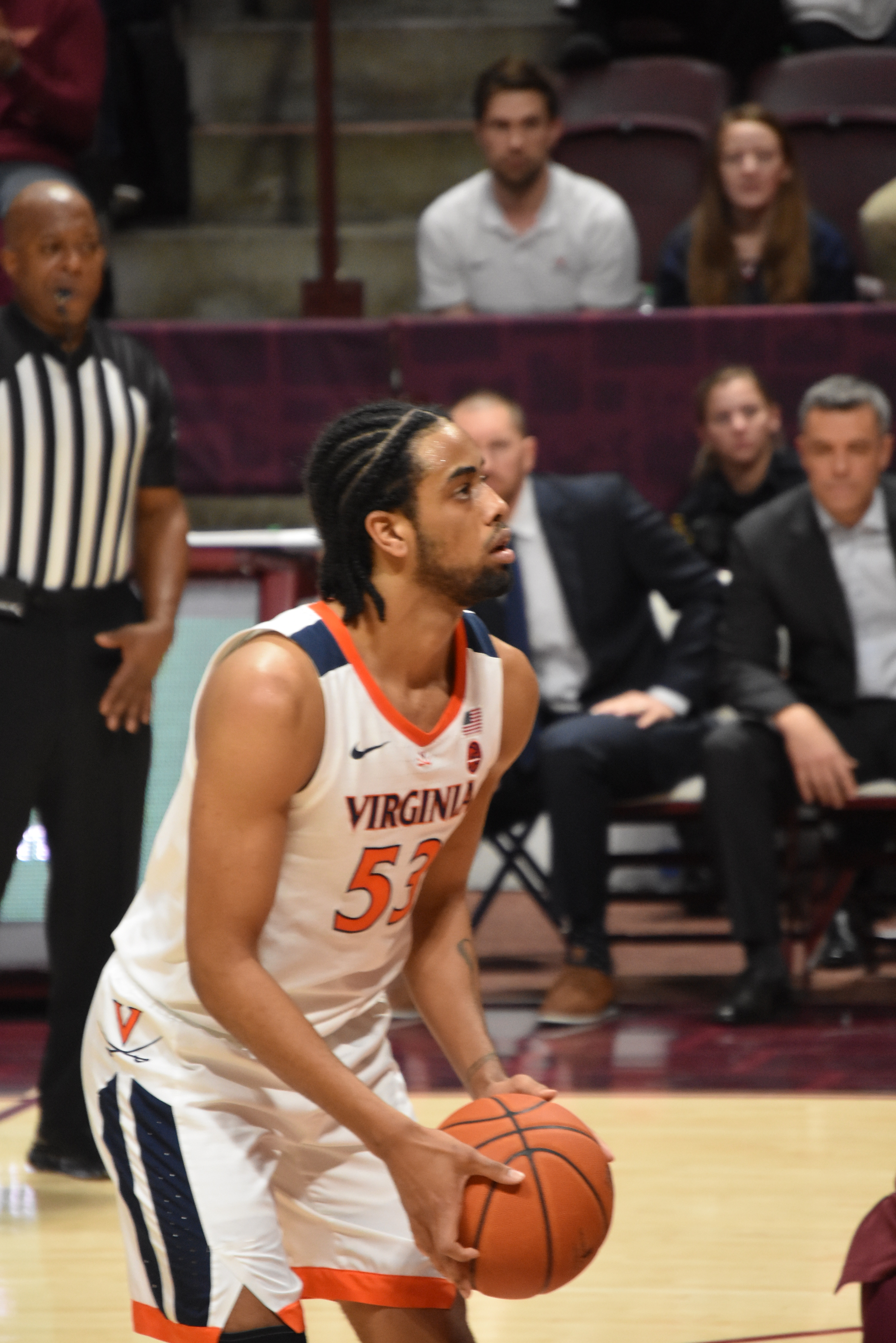
- Woldetensae in 2020

No. 7 – Pallacanestro Reggiana
- Position: Shooting guard
- League: LBA

Personal information
- Born: 30 April 1998 (age 28) Bologna, Italy
- Listed height: 6 ft 5 in (1.96 m)
- Listed weight: 196 lb (89 kg)

Career information
- High school: Victory Rock Prep (Bradenton, Florida)
- College: Indian Hills CC (2017–2019); Virginia (2019–2021)
- NBA draft: 2021: undrafted
- Playing career: 2021–present

Career history
- 2021–2022: Chieti Basket 1974
- 2022–2024: Pallacanestro Varese
- 2024–2025: Napoli Basket
- 2025–present: Reggio Emilia

Career highlights
- First-team NJCAA All-American (2019)

Andriu Tomas Woldetensae (born 30 April 1998) is an Italian professional basketball player for Pallacanestro Reggiana of the Italian Lega Basket Serie A (LBA). He played college basketball for the Indian Hills Warriors and the Virginia Cavaliers.

== Early life and high school career ==
Woldetensae was born and raised in Bologna, Italy and is the son of an Eritrean mother Zaid Woldetensae. Growing up, he played basketball, soccer, and swimming but is also interested in art. Woldetensae played two seasons at Victory Rock Prep in Bradenton, Florida, the only American high school that responded to him. He received a scholarship offer from UMKC, but ran into NCAA issues and instead committed to play at Indian Hills Community College in Ottumwa, Iowa.

== College career ==
As a freshman at Indian Hills, Woldetensae averaged 8.8 points, 2.5 rebounds and 3.1 assists per game. He averaged 17.3 points, 2.8 rebounds and 2.5 assists per game as a sophomore, shooting 47.6 percent from three-point range, which helped his team get to the NJCAA National Tournament's second round. However, was forced to miss the last four games, including the NJCAA Tournament, due to a broken bone in his wrist. He was named a First Team NJCAA All-American, the Iowa Community College Athletic Conference Division I Player of the Year and was a First Team all-region selection. Woldetensae committed to Virginia, after receiving interest from Arizona, UCF, Maryland and Oregon.

On 15 February 2020 he scored 18 points and hit the game-winning three-pointer with 0.3 seconds remaining in a 64–62 win at North Carolina. As a junior, Woldetensae averaged 6.6 points, 2.2 rebounds, and 1.1 assists per game. He averaged 4.4 points and 1.3 rebounds per game as a senior. On 7 April 2021 Woldetensae announced that he would turn professional rather than take advantage of the additional season of eligibility granted by the NCAA due to the COVID-19 pandemic.

== Professional career ==
On 21 July 2021 Woldetensae signed his first professional contract with Chieti Basket 1974 of the Serie A2 Basket. In 16 games, he averaged 8.5 points, 3.4 rebounds, and 1.4 steals per game. On 11 February 2022 Woldetensae signed with Pallacanestro Varese of the Lega Basket Serie A.

On July 4, 2024, he signed with Napoli Basket of the Italian Lega Basket Serie A (LBA).

On July 10, 2025, he signed with Pallacanestro Reggiana of the Italian Lega Basket Serie A (LBA).

== National team career ==
Woldetensae was a candidate for the 2020 Italy men's OQT basketball team, but did not make the final roster.
