= Glasgow Kelvin College =

College in Glasgow, Scotland

- Former names: John Wheatley College; North Glasgow College; Stow College
- Type: Further Education
- Established: 1 November 2013
- Chairman: Ian Patrick
- Principal: Joanna Campbell
- Location: Glasgow, Scotland, UK
- Campus: Easterhouse 'East End' (Haghill) Springburn
- Website: www.glasgowkelvin.ac.uk

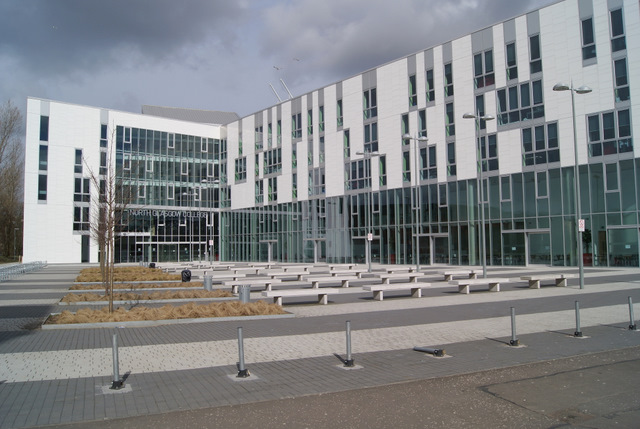
Springburn Campus

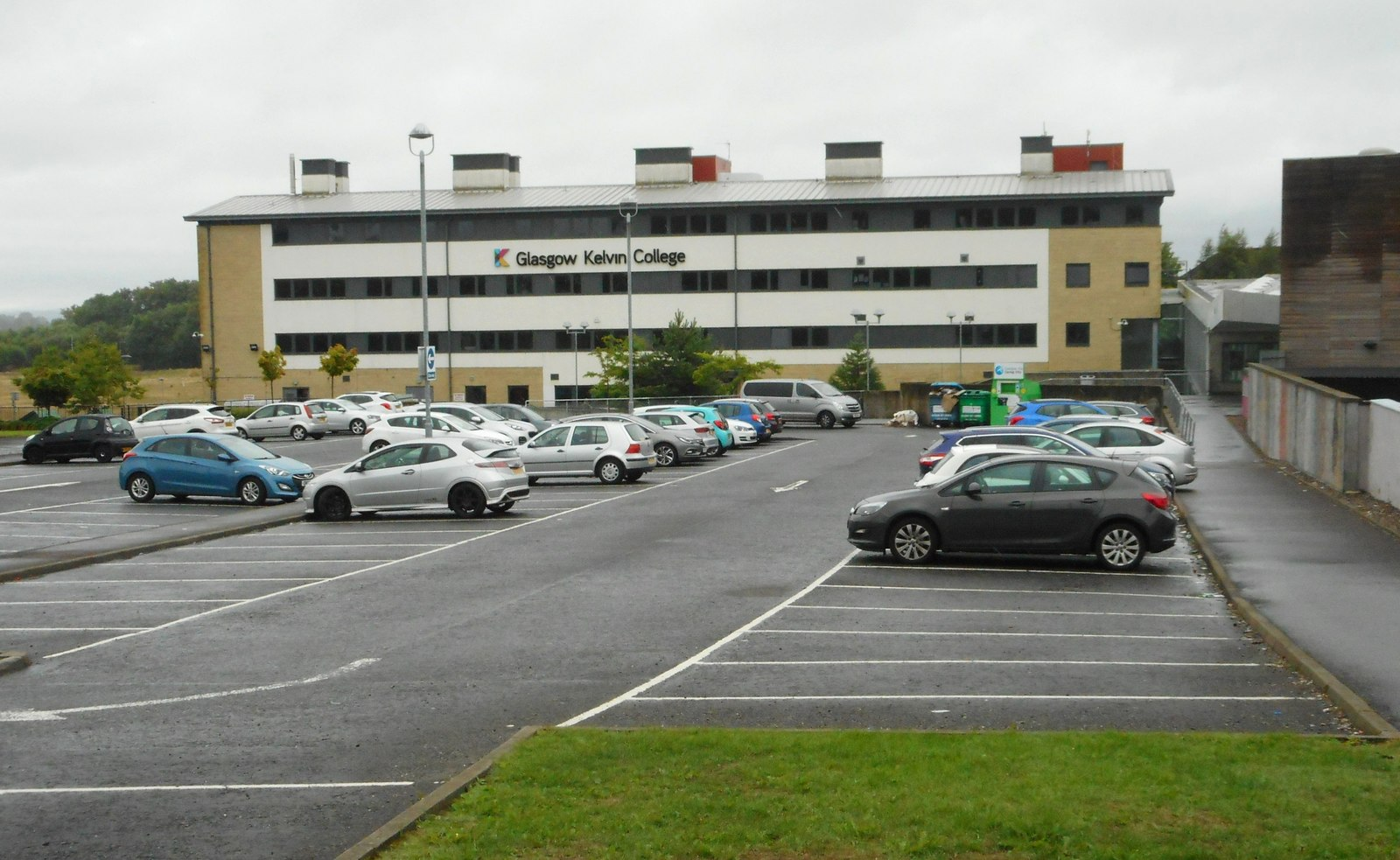
Easterhouse Campus

Glasgow Kelvin College is a further education college in Glasgow, Scotland, which was formed on 1 November 2013 from the merger of John Wheatley College, Stow College and North Glasgow College. The college is named after the scientist Lord Kelvin as a statement of its intent to promote engineering and scientific education programmes.

There are three main campuses in the North East of the city and a community-based learning network of around 26 centres supported by the college. The college was officially opened on Monday 4 November 2013 by Michael Russell, MSP, Cabinet Secretary for Education and Lifelong Learning. The Strategic Plan for 2022/27 is available on the college website.

The college is assigned to the Glasgow Colleges' Regional Board(GCRB) which is the regional strategic body charged with overseeing FE in Glasgow.

The Principal is Derek Smeall, and the Chair is Ian Patrick. The college was the only Scottish member of the Gazelle College Group, a UK wide college grouping which sought to promote innovative approaches to learning and teaching, but as of January 2017 it was one of only six remaining members of the group, which was dissolved in 2021.

The college won the UK Beacon Award for widening access to FE/HE for 16- to 19-year-olds in 2013. In 2014 learners at the college swept the Board at the ScotGem Awards winning all three top prizes.

In December 2015 the college signed a partnership agreement with BEST the sector skills body for Building and Engineering Services.

The Board has approved a STEM Manifesto which sets out its ambition for developing this important curricular area. The college was awarded STEM Assured Status by NEF: The Innovation Institute in December 2015.

The college has developed Community Achievement Awards to recognise the learning undertaken by students in community-based settings. These awards are accredited within the SCQF framework and support the Statement of Ambition for Adult Learning.

The college has also signed a partnership with the Wheatley Group, expanding its community based learning network. The network is now known as the John Wheatley Learning Network in honour of John Wheatley (1869 – 1930) the former Shettleston MP and Minister for Housing in the first Labour Government. This network has expanded to other parts of the city as the demand for the college's approach to community-based learning increases.

As member of the Glasgow Colleges' Group the college is working with its two sister colleges in the city (City of Glasgow College and Glasgow Clyde College) to develop a 21st Century curriculum for Glasgow. Part of this curriculum approach will reduce the size of the college and include the closure of the former Stow College building in Shamrock Street.

The college is developing partnerships in India working with community colleges in that country to exchange learning experiences and develop teaching materials.

The college is a sponsor of Caledonia Gladiators professional basketball and collaborates with that organisation run a basketball academy combining sport with education.

== Student Association ==
The Glasgow Kelvin College Student Association is commonly known as GKCSA. It has one full-time sabbatical president (Welfare, Community & Sustainability) and one part-time sabbatical president (Learning and Teaching). They are governed by a Student Executive Committee, consisting of the SA presidents as well as student volunteers. They are currently affiliated with the National Union of Students (NUS) Scotland.

== Board of Management Members ==
Ian Patrick, Chair; John McBride, Vice Chair; Derek Smeall - Principal; Dr Marion Alison, Member; Colm Breathnach, Member; Steven Caldwell, Member; Dr. Elaine Clafferty, Member; Marie Docherty, Member; Robert Doyle, Member; Carol Goodwin, EIS-FELA Member; Dermot Grenham, Member; John Hogg, Member; Jennifer Lavery - Support Staff Member; Heather McNeil, Member; VACANT, Student Member; Chantell McCallum, Student Member; Michael O’Donnell, Member; Natalie Phillips, Member; Michele Stevenson, Member; Maree Shepherd, Unison Member; Linda Ellison, Secretary to the Board.

== Presidents of the College ==
2021–2022 – Lauren McLaren (FT) & James McGunnigle.

2022–2023 – Emma Leslie (FT) & Nomathamsanqa (Noma) Dube.

2023–2024 – Calum Campbell (FT) & Sonique Noreiga.

2024–2025 – VACANT (FT) & Chantell McCallum.
