= Stow College =

Former college in Glasgow, Scotland

Coordinates: 55.86891°N 4.26459°W

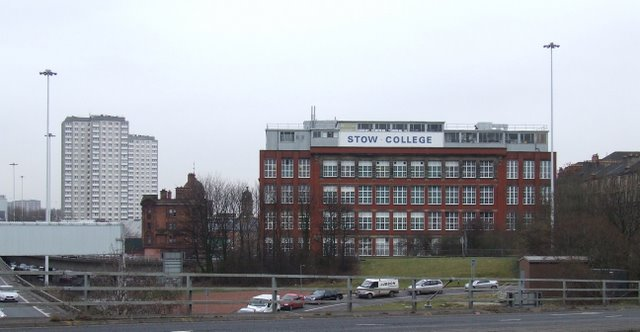
- Motto: Your tomorrow
- Type: College
- Active: 1934–2013
- Location: Glasgow, Scotland
- Website: Stow College website at the Wayback Machine (archived 2011-07-25)

Stow College was a college in Glasgow in Scotland.

== History ==
The college was named after David Stow, whose primary teaching seminary was founded close to the college at Dundasvale. The first purpose-built Further Education college in Glasgow, it celebrated its 75th anniversary in 2009.

Traditionally an engineering college, Stow diversified into ICT, social sciences, women's studies, business studies, and music . The college offered courses from introductory to Higher National Diploma level within the six departments, namely Music & Creative Industries, Management & General Education, Computing & Internet Technologies, Engineering Technology, Science & Health and Trade Union Education. It also offered online and distance learning and a large range of commercial short courses. The Trade Union Education Department was the largest of its type in Scotland and one of the most successful in the UK. It was also the only college in the Central Belt to offer a Gaelic immersion course.

The college won a number of Star Awards from the Scottish Qualifications Authority, including their top award, the Pride o' Worth Award. This was awarded due to the internationally renowned success of their record labels, Electric Honey, Gdansk, and Root8, which were run by Music Business Administration students. Acts which have been launched through the Electric Honey label include Snow Patrol (then known as Polar Bear), Belle & Sebastian, and Biffy Clyro. Belle & Sebastian's first album, Tigermilk, was released on the label in 1996.

The college was the first in Scotland to devise and offer a Higher National Certificate course in Computer Games Development which helped to support Scotland's thriving computer games industry.

Extensive links with local universities including the University of the West of Scotland, Glasgow Caledonian University and Strathclyde University ensured that students could progress to second or third year of degree courses.

Originally, the college's Music and Creative Industries department included a number of former professional musicians including Stuart Woody Wood (formerly of the Bay City Rollers), Alan Rankine (The Associates), and Ken McCluskey (The Bluebells). Additionally, lecturing staff were drawn from within the creative industries including active professionals from within Musical Theatre, Television, Composition, Music and Events Management and recording disciplines.

A highly innovative department, in 2009, 2010 and 2011 Students from the college's TV production course provided official coverage of the Glasgow Film Festival. A public information film (Doorstoppers, produced by Matt Quinn of Caledonian Television, who at one time lectured in TV production at the college), featuring material gathered by Stow College TV students, opened the 2009 Stirling Film Festival at the MacRobert Arts Centre.

Stow West was an additional campus in the Maryhill area in the north of Glasgow that opened in 2000. Latterly home to the Musical Theatre section (part of the MCI department) as well as an innovative business academy, it was approximately two miles (three kilometres) from the main City campus. The campus was a totally refurbished building, previously Shakespeare Street Primary School.

The college merged with John Wheatley College and North Glasgow College on 1 November 2013 to form Glasgow Kelvin College.

Stow College closed down and was sold in 2016 to The Glasgow School of Art. After a major refurbishment it is now known as the Stow Building.

== Notable alumni ==
- James Johnston
- Ben Johnston
- W. S. Graham
- John Reid (Former manager of Elton John and Queen)
- Craig A. Russell (Scottish Businessman
- J.R. Holmes (Marine Engineer)
- Stuart Murdoch (Co- founder of the band Belle and Sebastian)
- Stuart David (Co-founder of the band Belle and Sebastian)
