= Glasgow Clyde College =

College in Glasgow City, Scotland

- Other name: Glasgow Clyde
- Former names: Anniesland College; Cardonald College; Langside College
- Type: College of Further Education
- Established: 1 August 2013
- Principal: Jon Vincent
- Location: Glasgow, Scotland
- Website: www.glasgowclyde.ac.uk

Glasgow Clyde College is a further and higher education college, located in the Scottish city of Glasgow. It was created following the mergers of Anniesland College, Cardonald College and Langside College in August 2013.

== Merger timeline ==
On 17 November 2011, Cardonald College announced it had entered merger talks with Anniesland College.

In January 2012, Langside College first entered merger talks with Cardonald College and Anniesland College.

On 28 March 2012, it was announced by Cardonald College principal, Susan Walsh, that a merger with Cardonald College, Anniesland College and Langside College was "highly likely."

On 28 August 2012, a formal consultation was launched and ran until 16 November 2012.

On 14 December 2012, Cardonald College principal Susan Walsh was appointed principal of the new college.

On 1 August 2013, Anniesland College, Cardonald College and Langside College was merged to form Glasgow Clyde College.

In June 2019, officials from Glasgow Clyde College revealed that, "due to issues and decisions outside of the college's control we are required to absorb an additional £1 million of costs in the year ahead without any additional Government funding". As a result, the college will be looking at voluntary redundancies.

== Anniesland Campus ==
Anniesland Campus (Formerly Anniesland College) is located in the Claythorn neighbourhood of western Glasgow between Anniesland, Kelvindale and Gartnavel General Hospital, one block south of Great Western Road (A82) and Anniesland railway station. The college has seven schools, offering a range of courses and levels of study, full-time, part-time or flexibly. This new building is on Hatfield Drive, with a 3-storey classroom block, 2-storey workshops, a multimedia library and nursery.

== Cardonald Campus ==
Cardonald Campus (formerly Cardonald College) is situated in the South Cardonald area, close to Mosspark and is close to Corkerhill railway station. Cardonald College officially opened in 1972 and was refurbished in the late 2000s. It has over 12,000 full-time and part-time students and intakes students who have just left school as well as mature students.

== Langside Campus ==
Langside Campus (Formerly Langside College) is located in the Mount Florida / Battlefield area of Glasgow, and has its own pedestrian entrance from Mount Florida railway station.

Langside enrols over 5,000 students every year of whom many are from countries outwith the European Union. There are four buildings on-site: the main campus (known as the Battlefield Building) and three others – the 1568 Theatre, The LITEhouse and the Mary Stuart Building (formerly known as the Business School).

Phase 1 of a newly built main campus was opened in May 2009, while Phase 2, incorporating new sport, music and drama facilities, opened in August 2010. The final phase – an outdoor sports facility – was completed in February 2011.

A new Horticulture Teaching Block was built in October 2017 to facilitate the students and staff involved in horticultural studies.
