= 2019–20 Super Basketball League =

- League: Super Basketball League
- Season: 2019–20
- Duration: 14 December 2019 – 12 April 2020 (Regular season); 14 April – 18 April 2020 (Playoffs); 21 April – 30 April 2020 (Finals)
- Games played: 32
- Teams: 5

Regular season
- Top seed: Taiwan Beer

Finals
- Champions: Taiwan Beer (5th title)
- Runners-up: Yulon Luxgen Dinos

The 2019–20 Super Basketball League was the seventeenth season of the Super Basketball League, which opened on December 14. The venues are distributed in Heping Basketball Stadium, Banqiao Stadium, Xinzhuang Stadium, Taoyuan Arena, Hsinchu Municipal Stadium, and Changhua County Stadium. This season, due to the withdrawal of the Dacin Tigers, the Taipei Fubon Braves to the ASEAN Basketball League, and the Golden Gate Winery Basketball Team was renamed the Kaohsiung Jeoutai Technology Basketball Team due to the change of sponsor to Jeoutai Technology. The participating teams are the Yulon Luxgen Dinos, Taoyuan Puyuan Architecture, Jeoutai Technology, Taiwan Beer and Bank of Taiwan. Due to the COVID-19 pandemic in the middle of the season, the star games in February and all events in the second half of the season were cancelled and closed games were adopted. Then, because the New Taipei City government closed the public venues on March 20, 2020, SBL was originally scheduled to suspend the game for two weeks, and subsequently changed to the Haoyu International Basketball Training Center as the venue for the competition. Under the influence of the pandemic, SBL became one of the few sports leagues that could sustain their season. Therefore, the broadcaster provided a viewing channel for global fans, including Twitter and YouTube, and cooperated with FIBA. In the live broadcast, there were a maximum of 847,000 viewership records on Twitter in the championship series, and also received media reports from The New York Times and ESPN.
