= Bubbleville =

Connecticut college basketball showcase series

- Sport: Men's & women's college basketball
- Founded: November 25, 2020
- Founder: Naismith Memorial Basketball Hall of Fame; Gazelle Group
- Folded: December 5, 2020
- No. of teams: 37
- Country: United States
- Venues: Mohegan Sun Arena, Uncasville, CT
- Broadcasters: FloHoops, ESPN
- Website: https://www.hoophall.com/events/bubbleville

Bubbleville was a series of early-season college basketball showcases held at the Mohegan Sun resort in Uncasville, Connecticut, during the opening months of the 2020–21 NCAA Division I men's and women's basketball seasons. Organized by Gazelle Group and the Naismith Memorial Basketball Hall of Fame, the series featured a number of events normally hosted by the bodies, moved to a bubble due to the COVID-19 pandemic in the United States.

There were 46 games scheduled, but only 26 were played, leaving 20 games canceled due to COVID-19 issues.

== Tournaments relocated to Bubbleville ==
- Empire Classic
- Legends Classic
- Hall of Fame Tip Off
- HomeLight Classic
- Basketball Hall of Fame Women's Challenge
- Women's Jimmy V Classic

== Notable games ==
- San Francisco upset #4 Virginia 61–60 on November 27, 2020 (HomeLight Classic)
- Virginia Tech beat #3 Villanova 81–73 on November 28, 2020 (Air Force Reserve Hall of Fame Tip-Off)
- UConn outlasted USC 61–58 on December 3, 2020 (Roman Legends Classic)
