= Cardonald College =

University in Glasgow City, Scotland

- Colàiste Chearr Dhòmhnaill Ghlaschu (Gaelic)
- Latin: Colligium Cardonaldis Glasguensis
- Type: college
- Established: 1972
- Principal: Susan Walsh
- Administrative staff: 1,500
- Students: 12,000
- Location: Glasgow, Scotland
- Campus: Mosspark Drive, Cardonald
- Website: http://www.glasgowclyde.ac.uk/

Cardonald College was a medium-sized Further education institute located in Glasgow's South Side, in Scotland. Officially opened in 1972, it had over 12,000 full-time and part-time students. Cardonald College merged with Anniesland College and Langside College in 2013 to become Glasgow Clyde College.

The main campus was located in the South Cardonald area of Cardonald, close to Mosspark. This Campus is located 5 miles (8 km) from Glasgow's city centre.

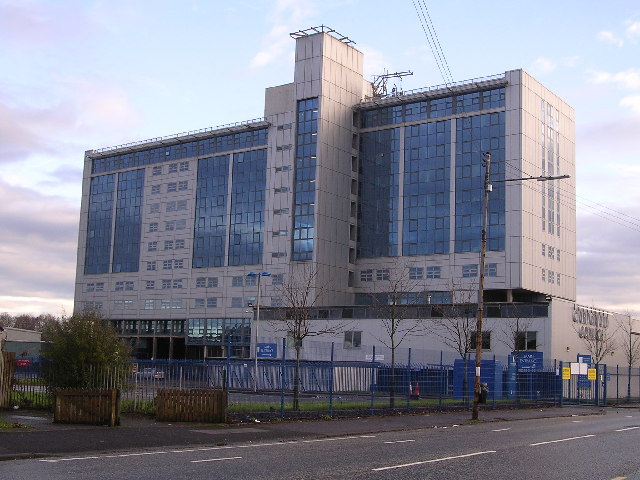
Cardonald College

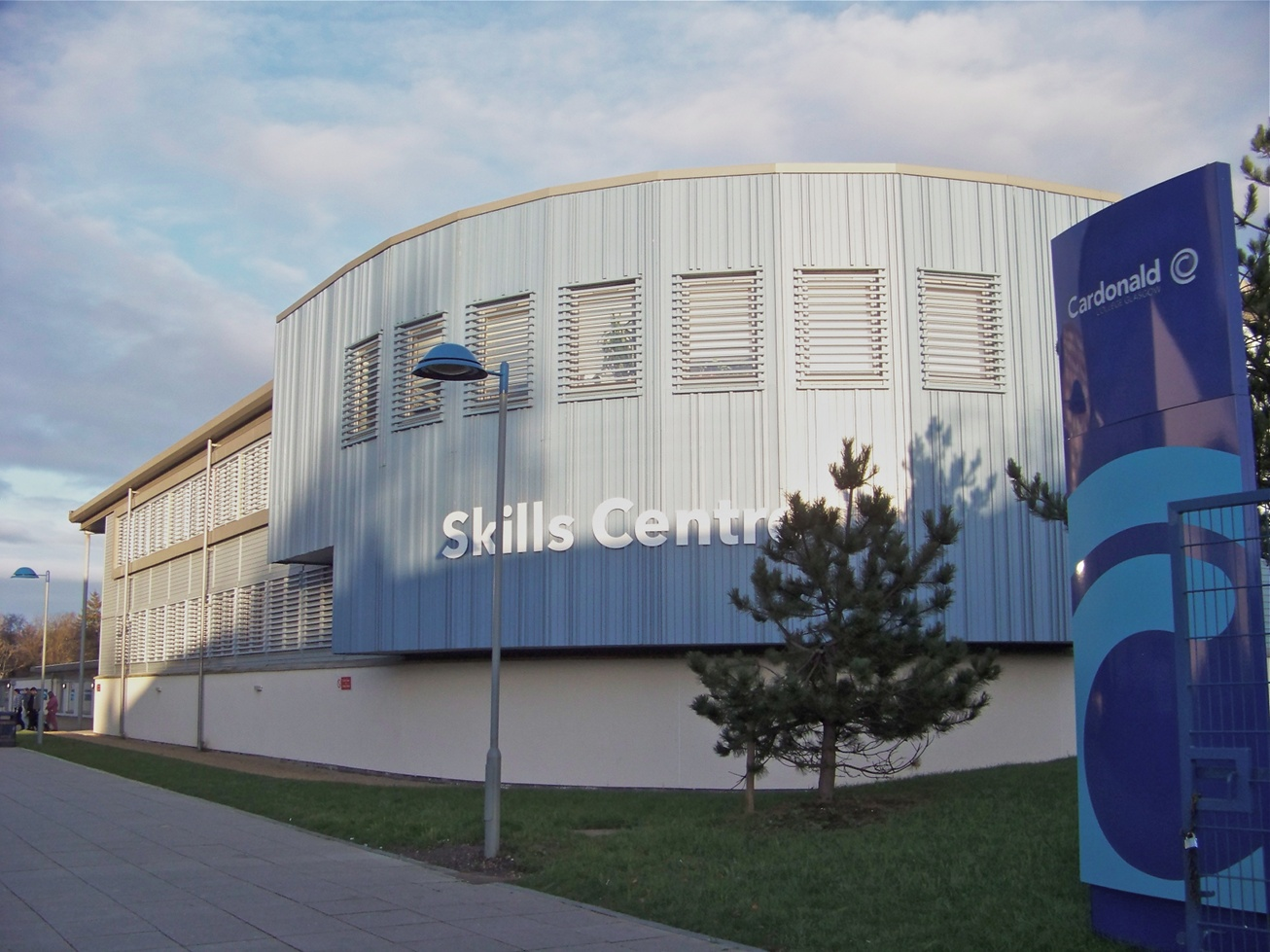
Cardonald College Skills Centre

== Mosspark Drive Campus ==
The Mosspark Drive Campus is located on Mosspark Drive. In 2004 Building Design Partnership was appointed architect and design team leader for a major refurbishment and development project at the campus. This comprised building a new Family Centre and an Industry Skills Centre, as well as refurbishment of the existing tower block at the campus. The Skills Centre was partly financed by a donation from the Robertson Trust of £100,000.

== Running of the College ==
In 1975 Strathclyde Regional Council became the administering authority of the college, taking over from the City of Glasgow Corporation.

From 1993 onwards the funding of further education colleges passed from local government to central government and the responsibility for Cardonald College devolved to a Board of Management.

== Qualifications ==
Cardonald College offered a range of qualifications certified by the Scottish Qualifications Authority. A number of these were:

- Intermediate 1
- Intermediate 2
- Highers
- Higher National Certificate
- Higher National Diploma
- Professional Development Awards
- Scottish Vocational Qualification

== Organisation ==
Cardonald College was split up into five faculties:

- Access & Continuing Learning
- Care, Science & Sport
- Creative Industries
- Technology & Business
- Training Solutions

== Chartered insurance institution ==
Cardonald College became the first Scottish higher education facility to become accredited by the Chartered Insurance Institute for its financial planning course.

== HMIE Inspection ==
Her Majesty's Inspectorate of Education is a government organisation in charge of checking the quality of education proved at a learning facility.

The most recent HMIE inspection took place on week beginning 10 March 2008.

HMIE found that Cardonald College had effective learning and teaching processes. Also that it was helping students progress, achieving suitable outcomes and that the college is managing well and increasing the quality of its services for its students

== Mergers ==
On 17 November 2011, Cardonald College announced it had entered merger talks with Anniesland College and on 28 March 2012 it was announced by Cardonald College principal, Susan Walsh, that a merger of Cardonald College, Anniesland College and Langside College was "highly likely."

On 30 July 2012, the colleges agreed to push ahead with merger plans and named The Guardian reporter and Cardonald College journalism lecturer, Kirsty Scott, the Merger Communications Manager.

On 28 August 2012, a formal consultation was launched which ran until 16 November 2012.

On 14 December 2012, Cardonald College principal Susan Walsh was appointed principal of the new college.

On 1 August 2013, Cardonald College, along with Anniesland College and Langside College, were absorbed to form Glasgow Clyde College. As a result of the merger, Cardonald College became Glasgow Clyde College Cardonald Campus.

== Alumni ==
- Libby McArthur, Scottish actress
- Robert Carlyle, Scottish actor
