= Rising Stars Challenge =

Basketball all-star game for 1st and 2nd year NBA players and G League players

- Frequency: Annual
- Inaugurated: 1994
- Participants: Top NBA rookies, sophomores, and G League players
- Organizer: National Basketball Association
- Sponsor: Castrol

The Rising Stars Challenge is a basketball exhibition game held by the National Basketball Association (NBA) on the Friday before the annual All-Star Game as part of the All-Star Weekend and is intended to showcase young and rising players in the league (mainly rookies from the games inception in 1994, second-year players since 2000 and NBA G League players since 2022). Since 2025, the game and surrounding events are sponsored by Castrol and is known as Castrol Rising Stars, with the 2026 event occurring on Friday, February 13 at Intuit Dome.

The current format used since 2022 includes rookie and sophomore NBA players and NBA G League players selected by the NBA's assistant coaches and league office. Former NBA players, designated as "honorary coaches", draft players for their respective teams, where they play in a single-elimination tournament to reach a Final Target Score in each game.

== History ==
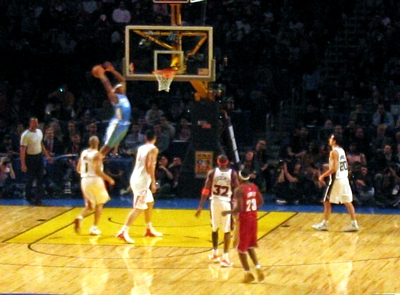
Carmelo Anthony receiving an alley-oop during the 2004 Rookie Challenge game.

=== Rookie Challenge (1994–2011) ===
The Rookie Challenge, established in 1994, was originally competed by two randomly selected teams composed entirely of first-year players. This format was continued until 1996, when it was changed to pit rookie teams of both the Eastern and the Western Conference against each other. In 1999, the game was cancelled as a result of the NBA lockout. Since the 1998 rookie class did not compete that year, the game was revamped in 2000 and featured a team of standout first-year players ('rookies') against a team of standout second-year players ('sophomores'). This format of Rookies vs Sophomores would continue past the 2000 game until the 2012.

=== Rising Stars Challenge (2012–2021) ===
The format of the game and name was changed to the Rising Stars Challenge in 2012. For 2012 and 2013, the format was changed to having two teams drafted by Basketball Hall of Famers Charles Barkley (Team Chuck) and Shaquille O'Neal (Team Shaq). In 2014, the two teams were drafted by Chris Webber (Team Webber) and Grant Hill (Team Hill). The game format changed in 2015 to Team USA vs Team World, where each team should choose at least three Rookies and three Sophomores, and the squad of each team should have four back courts, four front courts and two swingmen.

Unlike regular NBA games, the game was divided into two twenty-minute halves plus multiple five-minute overtime periods, similar to men's college basketball. The participating players were chosen by voting among the league's assistant coaches. In the game, players wear their respective regular team uniforms, except for 2009, in which players wore fan-designed jerseys. The head coaches of the two teams are the lead assistant coaches of the NBA All-Star Game coach. Starting in 2009, two active NBA players were added to the game coaching staffs.

=== Tournament-style format (2022–present) ===
The format was then changed again in 2022. 28 players are selected: 12 rookies, 12 sophomores, and 4 NBA G League Ignite players. They will be drafted into four teams of seven, which are led and coached by members of the NBA 75th Anniversary Team via a draft, in commemoration of the NBA's 75th anniversary season. The coaches include: Rick Barry, Gary Payton, Isiah Thomas and James Worthy. The format itself is now a tournament, with a Final Target Score for each round: 50 points for the semifinals, and 25 points for the finals, for a total of 75 points total for the team that wins the tournament, another nod to the NBA's 75th anniversary.

The format was slightly altered in 2023. 28 players are still selected, but the pool now consists of 21 NBA rookies and sophomores, and 7 NBA G League players (not just limited to NBA G League Ignite). The Final Target Score for the semifinal games was lowered from 50 to 40. In 2023, the 21 NBA players were drafted into three teams led by Pau Gasol, Joakim Noah, and Deron Williams, while the 7 NBA G League players form a single team led by Jason Terry. In 2024, the coaches were Pau Gasol, Tamika Catchings, Jalen Rose, and Detlef Schrempf, with Schrempf coaching the G League team. The format used in 2023 and 2024 will be used for the main NBA All-Star Game beginning in 2025, with the winner of the Rising Stars Challenge additionally qualifying for the All-Star Game itself. In 2025, with the event being held in San Francisco, the NBA rookies and sophomores were coached by the Run TMC trio of Tim Hardaway, Mitch Richmond, and Chris Mullin, with the teams named after their respective initials. The G League team was coached by Jeremy Lin, who began his career with the Golden State Warriors.

== List of rosters and results ==
=== 1994 game ===
The 1994 Rookie Challenge took place on February 12 at the Target Center in Minneapolis. Penny Hardaway was the MVP of the game.

Sensations
Pos.	Player	Team
SF	Chris Mills	Cleveland Cavaliers
SF	Jamal Mashburn	Dallas Mavericks
C	Shawn Bradley	Philadelphia 76ers
PG	Penny Hardaway	Orlando Magic
PG	Nick Van Exel	Los Angeles Lakers
SG	Calbert Cheaney	Washington Bullets
C	P. J. Brown	New Jersey Nets
PF	Popeye Jones	Dallas Mavericks
Head coach: K. C. Jones

Phenoms
Pos.	Player	Team
SF	Toni Kukoč	Chicago Bulls
PF	Dino Rađa	Boston Celtics
PF	Chris Webber	Golden State Warriors
PG	Lindsey Hunter	Detroit Pistons
SG	Isaiah Rider	Minnesota Timberwolves
PF	Antonio Davis	Indiana Pacers
PG	Sam Cassell	Houston Rockets
SF	Bryon Russell	Utah Jazz
Head coach: Doug Collins

=== 1995 game ===
The 1995 Rookie Challenge took place on February 11 at the America West Arena in Phoenix.

Green Team
Pos.	Player	Team
PF	Brian Grant	Sacramento Kings
PF	Juwan Howard	Washington Bullets
SF	Sharone Wright	Philadelphia 76ers
SG	Eddie Jones	Los Angeles Lakers
PG	Jason Kidd	Dallas Mavericks
SF	Jalen Rose	Denver Nuggets
PF	Anthony Tucker	Washington Bullets
PF	Michael Smith	Sacramento Kings
Head coach: Al Attles

White Team
Pos.	Player	Team
SF	Glenn Robinson	Milwaukee Bucks
SF	Lamond Murray	Los Angeles Clippers
C	Eric Montross	Boston Celtics
SG	Wesley Person	Phoenix Suns
PG	Khalid Reeves	Miami Heat
PF	Clifford Rozier	Golden State Warriors
PF	Donyell Marshall	Minnesota Timberwolves
PG	Trevor Ruffin	Phoenix Suns
Head coach: Cotton Fitzsimmons

=== 1996 game ===
The 1996 Rookie Challenge took place on February 10 at the Alamodome in San Antonio.

East
Pos.	Player	Team
PF	Alan Henderson	Atlanta Hawks
SG	Jerry Stackhouse	Philadelphia 76ers
PG	Damon Stoudamire	Toronto Raptors
SG	Bob Sura	Cleveland Cavaliers
PF	Kurt Thomas	Miami Heat
PF	Rasheed Wallace	Washington Bullets
SF	Eric Williams	Boston Celtics
C	George Zidek	Charlotte Hornets
Head coach: Bob Lanier

West
Pos.	Player	Team
SG	Brent Barry	Los Angeles Clippers
PG	Tyus Edney	Sacramento Kings
SF	Michael Finley	Phoenix Suns
PF	Kevin Garnett	Minnesota Timberwolves
PF	Antonio McDyess	Denver Nuggets
C	Bryant Reeves	Vancouver Grizzlies
C	Arvydas Sabonis	Portland Trail Blazers
PF	Joe Smith	Golden State Warriors
Head coach: Doug Moe

=== 1997 game ===
The 1997 Rookie Challenge took place on February 8 at the Gund Arena in Cleveland.

East
Pos.	Player	Team
SG	Ray Allen	Milwaukee Bucks
C	Marcus Camby	Toronto Raptors
C	Erick Dampier	Indiana Pacers
PG	Allen Iverson	Philadelphia 76ers
SG	Kerry Kittles	New Jersey Nets
C	Vitaly Potapenko	Cleveland Cavaliers
PF	Antoine Walker	Boston Celtics
SF	John Wallace	New York Knicks
Head coach: Red Auerbach

West
Pos.	Player	Team
PF	Shareef Abdur-Rahim	Vancouver Grizzlies
SG	Kobe Bryant	Los Angeles Lakers
PG	Derek Fisher	Los Angeles Lakers
C	Travis Knight	Los Angeles Lakers
PG	Matt Maloney	Houston Rockets
PG	Stephon Marbury**	Minnesota Timberwolves
PG	Steve Nash	Phoenix Suns
PF	Roy Rogers	Vancouver Grizzlies
C	Samaki Walker**	Dallas Mavericks
PF	Lorenzen Wright	Los Angeles Clippers
Head coach: Red Holzman

* Did not play due to injury

=== 1998 game ===
The 1998 Rookie Challenge took place on February 8 at the Madison Square Garden in New York City.

East
Pos.	Player	Team
PG	Chauncey Billups	Boston Celtics
SG	Derek Anderson*	Cleveland Cavaliers
PF	Cedric Henderson	Cleveland Cavaliers
C	Zydrunas Ilgauskas	Cleveland Cavaliers
PG	Brevin Knight	Cleveland Cavaliers
SF	Tracy McGrady	Toronto Raptors
SF	Ron Mercer	Boston Celtics
SF	Tim Thomas	Philadelphia 76ers
SF	Keith Van Horn	New Jersey Nets
Head coach: Willis Reed

West
Pos.	Player	Team
C	Kelvin Cato	Portland Trail Blazers
PG	Antonio Daniels	Vancouver Grizzlies
PF	Danny Fortson	Denver Nuggets
PG	Bobby Jackson	Denver Nuggets
SG	Rodrick Rhodes	Houston Rockets
PF	Michael Stewart	Sacramento Kings
PF	Maurice Taylor	Los Angeles Clippers
PG	Alvin Williams	Portland Trail Blazers
Head coach: Dave DeBusschere

* Did not play due to injury

=== 2000 game ===
The 1999 game was not held due to the 1998–99 NBA lockout. The 2000 Rookie Challenge took place on February 12 at the Oakland Arena in Oakland.

Rookies
Pos.	Player	Team
PG	Andre Miller	Cleveland Cavaliers
PF	Elton Brand	Chicago Bulls
SF	Lamar Odom	Los Angeles Clippers
PG	Steve Francis	Houston Rockets
SF	James Posey	Denver Nuggets
SF	Adrian Griffin	Boston Celtics
C	Todd MacCulloch	Philadelphia 76ers
SG	Wally Szczerbiak	Minnesota Timberwolves
Head coach: Al Attles
Assistant coach: Nate Thurmond

Sophomores
Pos.	Player	Team
PF	Dirk Nowitzki	Dallas Mavericks
SF	Paul Pierce	Boston Celtics
C	Raef LaFrentz	Denver Nuggets
SG	Cuttino Mobley	Houston Rockets
PG	Jason Williams	Sacramento Kings
PG	Mike Bibby	Vancouver Grizzlies
SG	Michael Dickerson	Vancouver Grizzlies
C	Michael Olowokandi	Los Angeles Clippers
SF	Antawn Jamison*	Golden State Warriors
Head coach: Bill Russell
Assistant coach: K. C. Jones

* Did not play due to injury

=== 2001 game ===
The 2001 Rookie Challenge took place on February 10 at the Verizon Center in Washington, D.C.

Rookies
Pos.	Player	Team
C	Marc Jackson	Golden State Warriors
SG	Morris Peterson	Toronto Raptors
PF	Kenyon Martin	New Jersey Nets
PG	Mateen Cleaves	Detroit Pistons
SG	Quentin Richardson	Los Angeles Clippers
PG	Khalid El-Amin	Chicago Bulls
SG	Stephen Jackson	New Jersey Nets
PG	Darius Miles	Los Angeles Clippers
SG	Mike Miller	Orlando Magic
Head coach: Kevin Loughery
Assistant coach: Jack Marin

Sophomores
Pos.	Player	Team
PF	Elton Brand	Chicago Bulls
SF	Richard Hamilton	Washington Wizards
SF	Lamar Odom	Los Angeles Clippers
PG	Baron Davis	Charlotte Hornets
PG	Steve Francis	Houston Rockets
PF	Shawn Marion	Phoenix Suns
PG	Andre Miller	Cleveland Cavaliers
SG	Wally Szczerbiak	Minnesota Timberwolves
SG	Jason Terry	Atlanta Hawks
Head coach: Elvin Hayes
Assistant coach: Phil Chenier

=== 2002 game ===
The 2002 Rookie Challenge took place on February 9 at the First Union Center in Philadelphia.

Rookies
Pos.	Player	Team
SG	Jason Richardson	Golden State Warriors
PG	Jamaal Tinsley	Indiana Pacers
PF	Pau Gasol	Memphis Grizzlies
SF	Shane Battier	Memphis Grizzlies
C	Brendan Haywood	Washington Wizards
C	Željko Rebrača	Detroit Pistons
PG	Tony Parker	San Antonio Spurs
SG	Joe Johnson	Phoenix Suns
C	Andrei Kirilenko	Utah Jazz
Head coach: Chuck Daly
Assistant coach: Darryl Dawkins

Sophomores
Pos.	Player	Team
SG	Quentin Richardson	Los Angeles Clippers
SG	Mike Miller	Orlando Magic
PF	Kenyon Martin	New Jersey Nets
PF	Lee Nailon	Charlotte Hornets
C	Chris Mihm	Cleveland Cavaliers
PF	Marcus Fizer	Chicago Bulls
PG	Darius Miles	Los Angeles Clippers
SG	Desmond Mason	Seattle SuperSonics
SF	Hedo Türkoğlu	Sacramento Kings
Head coach: Billy Cunningham
Assistant coach: Bobby Jones

=== 2003 game ===
The 2003 Rookie Challenge took place on February 8 at the Philips Arena in Atlanta.

Rookies
Pos.	Player	Team
PG	Jay Williams	Chicago Bulls
SG	Gordan Giricek	Orlando Magic
SF	Caron Butler	Miami Heat
PF	Drew Gooden	Memphis Grizzlies
PF	Amar'e Stoudemire	Phoenix Suns
PF	Carlos Boozer	Cleveland Cavaliers
C	Nene	Denver Nuggets
SG	Marko Jarić	Los Angeles Clippers
SG	Dajuan Wagner	Cleveland Cavaliers
Head coach: Cotton Fitzsimmons
Assistant coach: Lou Hudson

Sophomores
Pos.	Player	Team
PG	Gilbert Arenas	Golden State Warriors
PG	Tony Parker	San Antonio Spurs
PF	Troy Murphy	Golden State Warriors
SF	Richard Jefferson	New Jersey Nets
PF	Pau Gasol	Memphis Grizzlies
C	Andrei Kirilenko	Utah Jazz
SG	Jason Richardson	Golden State Warriors
C	Tyson Chandler	Chicago Bulls
PG	Jamaal Tinsley	Indiana Pacers
Head coach: Mike Fratello
Assistant coach: Bob Pettit

February 8

Sophomores 132, Rookies 112

Philips Arena, Atlanta

=== 2004 game ===
The 2004 Rookie Challenge took place on February 13 at the Staples Center in Los Angeles.

Rookies
Pos.	Player	Team
SF	Carmelo Anthony	Denver Nuggets
PF	Chris Bosh	Toronto Raptors
SG	Dwyane Wade	Miami Heat
SF	LeBron James	Cleveland Cavaliers
SF	Jarvis Hayes	Washington Wizards
PG	Kirk Hinrich	Chicago Bulls
SF	Josh Howard	Dallas Mavericks
C	Chris Kaman	Los Angeles Clippers
PF	Udonis Haslem	Miami Heat
Head coach: Doug Collins
Assistant coach: A.C. Green

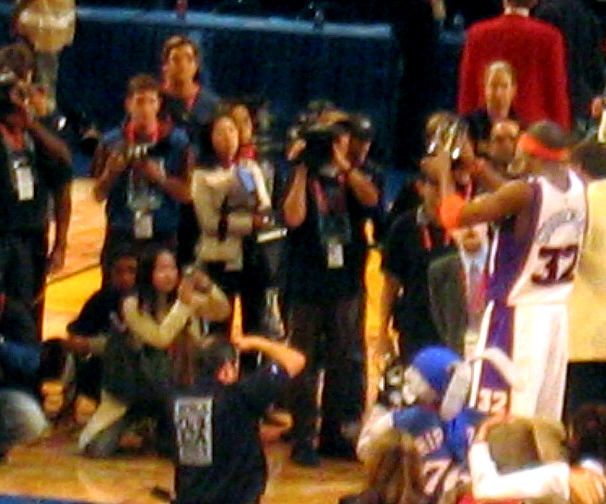
Stoudemire (far right) receiving the MVP award for the 2004 Rookie Challenge game.

Sophomores
Pos.	Player	Team
PF	Carlos Boozer	Cleveland Cavaliers
SG	Mike Dunleavy Jr.	Golden State Warriors
SG	Manu Ginóbili	San Antonio Spurs
SG	Marko Jarić	Los Angeles Clippers
PG	Ronald Murray	Seattle SuperSonics
C	Nenê	Denver Nuggets
SF	Tayshaun Prince	Detroit Pistons
PF	Amar'e Stoudemire	Phoenix Suns
C	Yao Ming	Houston Rockets
Head coach: Michael Cooper
Assistant coach: Kareem Abdul-Jabbar

Viewers have describe the game as exciting because of the highlight reels that are created using footage from the game. Much of the hype centered on rookie phenoms LeBron James and Carmelo Anthony, who had 33 and 17 points respectively. Amar'e Stoudemire set a then-Rookie Challenge record with 36 points.

=== 2005 game ===
The 2005 Rookie Challenge took place on February 18 at the Pepsi Center in Denver.

Rookies
Pos.	Player	Team
SF	Tony Allen	Boston Celtics
SF	Luol Deng	Chicago Bulls
PG	Devin Harris	Dallas Mavericks
C	Dwight Howard	Orlando Magic
SF	Andre Iguodala	Philadelphia 76ers
C	Emeka Okafor*	Charlotte Bobcats
SF	Josh Smith	Atlanta Hawks
PG	Beno Udrih	San Antonio Spurs
PF	Al Jefferson	Boston Celtics
Head coach: P. J. Carlesimo
Assistant coach: Alex English

Sophomores
Pos.	Player	Team
SF	Carmelo Anthony	Denver Nuggets
PF	Chris Bosh	Toronto Raptors
PF	Udonis Haslem	Miami Heat
PG	Kirk Hinrich	Chicago Bulls
SF	Josh Howard	Dallas Mavericks
SF	LeBron James	Cleveland Cavaliers
SG	Kyle Korver	Philadelphia 76ers
PG	Luke Ridnour	Seattle SuperSonics
SG	Dwyane Wade	Miami Heat
Head coach: Bob McAdoo
Assistant coach: Doug Moe

* Did not play due to injury

=== 2006 game ===
The 2006 Rookie Challenge took place on February 17 at the Toyota Center in Houston.

Rookies
Pos.	Player	Team
C	Andrew Bogut	Milwaukee Bucks
C	Channing Frye	New York Knicks
SF	Danny Granger	Indiana Pacers
SG	Luther Head	Houston Rockets
PG	Šarūnas Jasikevičius	Indiana Pacers
PG	Chris Paul	New Orleans/Oklahoma City Hornets
PG	Nate Robinson	New York Knicks
PF	Charlie Villanueva	Toronto Raptors
PG	Deron Williams	Utah Jazz
Head coach: Sidney Lowe
Assistant coach: Elvin Hayes

Sophomores
Pos.	Player	Team
SF	Luol Deng	Chicago Bulls
PG	T. J. Ford	Milwaukee Bucks
SG	Ben Gordon	Chicago Bulls
PG	Devin Harris	Dallas Mavericks
C	Dwight Howard	Orlando Magic
SF	Andre Iguodala	Philadelphia 76ers
C	Nenad Krstić	New Jersey Nets
PG	Jameer Nelson*	Orlando Magic
SF	Andrés Nocioni	Chicago Bulls
C	Emeka Okafor*	Charlotte Bobcats
PG	Delonte West	Boston Celtics
Head coach: Del Harris
Assistant coach: Moses Malone

* Did not play due to injury

February 17

Sophomores 105, Rookies 96

Toyota Center, Houston

=== 2007 game ===
The 2007 Rookie Challenge took place on February 16 at the Thomas & Mack Center in Paradise, Nevada.

Rookies
Pos.	Player	Team
PF	Andrea Bargnani	Toronto Raptors
PG	Jordan Farmar	Los Angeles Lakers
SG	Randy Foye	Minnesota Timberwolves
PF	Jorge Garbajosa	Toronto Raptors
SF	Rudy Gay	Memphis Grizzlies
PF	Paul Millsap	Utah Jazz
SF	Adam Morrison	Charlotte Bobcats
SG	Brandon Roy	Portland Trail Blazers
SG	Marcus Williams	New Jersey Nets
Head coach: Mike O'Koren
Assistant coach: Dave Bing

Sophomores
Pos.	Player	Team
C	Andrew Bogut	Milwaukee Bucks
C	Andrew Bynum	Los Angeles Lakers
SG	Monta Ellis	Golden State Warriors
PG	Raymond Felton	Charlotte Bobcats
SF	Danny Granger	Indiana Pacers
SG	Luther Head	Houston Rockets
PF	David Lee	New York Knicks
PG	Chris Paul	New Orleans Hornets
PG	Deron Williams	Utah Jazz
Head coach: Marc Iavaroni
Assistant coach: Oscar Robertson

February 17

Sophomores 155, Rookies 114

Thomas & Mack Center, Paradise, Nevada

=== 2008 game ===
Rookies
Pos.	Player	Team
PG	Mike Conley	Memphis Grizzlies
SF	Kevin Durant	Seattle SuperSonics
SG	Jeff Green	Seattle SuperSonics
C	Al Horford	Atlanta Hawks
PF	Yi Jianlian	Milwaukee Bucks
SF	Jamario Moon	Toronto Raptors
SG	Juan Carlos Navarro	Memphis Grizzlies
PF	Luis Scola	Houston Rockets
C	Sean Williams	New Jersey Nets
Head coach: Darrell Walker
Assistant coach: Bob Pettit

Sophomores
Pos.	Player	Team
PF	LaMarcus Aldridge	Portland Trail Blazers
PF	Andrea Bargnani	Toronto Raptors
SG	Ronnie Brewer	Utah Jazz
PG	Jordan Farmar	Los Angeles Lakers
SF	Rudy Gay	Memphis Grizzlies
PG	Daniel Gibson	Cleveland Cavaliers
PF	Paul Millsap	Utah Jazz
PG	Rajon Rondo	Boston Celtics
SG	Brandon Roy	Portland Trail Blazers
Head coach: Tom Thibodeau
Assistant coach: Willis Reed

February 15

Rookies 109, Sophomores 136
Scoring by half: 52-66, 57-70

New Orleans Arena, New Orleans

=== 2009 game ===
Rookies
Pos.	Player	Team
F	Michael Beasley	Miami Heat
G/F	Rudy Fernández	Portland Trail Blazers
C	Marc Gasol	Memphis Grizzlies
G	Eric Gordon	Los Angeles Clippers
C	Brook Lopez	New Jersey Nets
G	O. J. Mayo	Memphis Grizzlies
C	Greg Oden^{INJ}	Portland Trail Blazers
G	Derrick Rose	Chicago Bulls
G	Russell Westbrook	Oklahoma City Thunder
Head coach: Kurt Rambis (Los Angeles Lakers)
Assistant coach: Dwyane Wade (Miami Heat)

Sophomores
Pos.	Player	Team
G	Aaron Brooks	Houston Rockets
F	Wilson Chandler	New York Knicks
G/F	Kevin Durant	Oklahoma City Thunder
F	Jeff Green	Oklahoma City Thunder
C/F	Al Horford	Atlanta Hawks
F	Luis Scola	Houston Rockets
F	Al Thornton	Los Angeles Clippers
G	Rodney Stuckey	Detroit Pistons
F	Thaddeus Young	Philadelphia 76ers
Head coach: John Kuester (Cleveland Cavaliers)
Assistant coach: Dwight Howard (Orlando Magic)

^INJ Greg Oden was unable to participate due to injury.

TNT

February 13
9:00 p.m.

Recap
Boxscore

Rookies 116, Sophomores 122
Scoring by half: 61–58, 55–64
Pts: Michael Beasley 29; Rebs: Marc Gasol 8 Asts: Derrick Rose 7	Pts: Kevin Durant 46; Rebs: Durant, Chandler 7 each Asts: Rodney Stuckey 9

US Airways Center, Phoenix, Arizona
Attendance: 16,362
Referees:
- #56 Mark Ayotte
- #64 Eli Roe
- #42 Eric Lewis

=== 2010 game ===
Rookies
Pos.	Player	Team
F/C	DeJuan Blair	San Antonio Spurs
F	Omri Casspi	Sacramento Kings
G	Stephen Curry	Golden State Warriors
G	Tyreke Evans	Sacramento Kings
G	Jonny Flynn	Minnesota Timberwolves
F	Taj Gibson	Chicago Bulls
G	James Harden	Oklahoma City Thunder
G	Brandon Jennings	Milwaukee Bucks
F	Jonas Jerebko	Detroit Pistons
Head coach: Adrian Dantley (Denver Nuggets)
Assistant coach: Kevin Durant (Oklahoma City Thunder)

Sophomores
Pos.	Player	Team
F	Michael Beasley	Miami Heat
C	Marc Gasol	Memphis Grizzlies
F	Danilo Gallinari	New York Knicks
G	Eric Gordon	Los Angeles Clippers
C	Brook Lopez	New Jersey Nets
F/C	Kevin Love	Minnesota Timberwolves
G	O. J. Mayo	Memphis Grizzlies
G	Anthony Morrow^{REP}	Golden State Warriors
G	Derrick Rose^{DNP}	Chicago Bulls
G	Russell Westbrook	Oklahoma City Thunder
Head coach: Patrick Ewing (Orlando Magic)
Assistant coach: Chris Bosh (Toronto Raptors)

^DNP Derrick Rose was excused from the Rookie Challenge in consideration of being named to the All-Star Game and his participation in the Skills Challenge.
^REP Anthony Morrow was named as a replacement for Derrick Rose.

TNT

February 12
9:00 p.m. ET

Boxscore

Rookies 140, Sophomores 128
Scoring by half: 67–55, 73–73
Pts: Tyreke Evans 26; Rebs: DeJuan Blair 23; Asts: Brandon Jennings 8	Pts: Russell Westbrook 40; Rebs: Beasley, Lopez 7 each Asts: O. J. Mayo 10

American Airlines Center, Dallas
Attendance: 19,200
Referees:
- #67 John Goble
- #65 Sean Wright
- #60 David Guthrie

=== 2011 game ===
Rookies
Pos.	Player	Team
G	Eric Bledsoe	Los Angeles Clippers
C	DeMarcus Cousins	Sacramento Kings
F	Derrick Favors	New Jersey Nets
G	Landry Fields	New York Knicks
F	Blake Griffin	Los Angeles Clippers
G	Wesley Johnson	Minnesota Timberwolves
C	Greg Monroe	Detroit Pistons
G	Gary Neal	San Antonio Spurs
G	John Wall	Washington Wizards
Head coach: Mike Budenholzer (San Antonio Spurs)
Assistant coach: Amar'e Stoudemire (New York Knicks)
Assistant coach: Kevin McHale

Sophomores
Pos.	Player	Team
C	DeJuan Blair	San Antonio Spurs
G	Stephen Curry	Golden State Warriors
G	Tyreke Evans^{INJ}	Sacramento Kings
G	DeMar DeRozan	Toronto Raptors
F	Taj Gibson	Chicago Bulls
G	James Harden^{REP}	Oklahoma City Thunder
G	Jrue Holiday	Philadelphia 76ers
F	Serge Ibaka	Oklahoma City Thunder
G	Brandon Jennings	Milwaukee Bucks
G	Wesley Matthews	Portland Trail Blazers
Head coach: Lawrence Frank (Boston Celtics)
Assistant coach: Carmelo Anthony (New York Knicks)
Assistant coach: Steve Kerr

^INJ Tyreke Evans was unable to participate due to injury.
^REP James Harden was named Tyreke Evans' replacement.

TNT

February 18
9:00 p.m. ET

Boxscore

Rookies 148, Sophomores 140
Scoring by half: 71–69, 77–71
Pts: DeMarcus Cousins 33; Rebs: DeMarcus Cousins 14; Asts: John Wall 22	Pts: James Harden 30; Rebs: DeJuan Blair 15; Asts: Stephen Curry 8

Staples Center, Los Angeles
Attendance: 17,163
Referees:
- #53 Mark Lindsay
- #74 Curtis Blair
- #45 Brian Forte

=== 2012 game ===
Shortly before the draft for the rosters, Norris Cole and Jeremy Lin were added to the original player pool. A few days before the game, Tiago Splitter was injured and was replaced by Derrick Favors. Lin played only nine minutes in the game, at his request, due to exhaustion from his rise to stardom that month.

Team Shaq
Round	Pick	Pos.	Player	Team	R/S
1	1	F	Blake Griffin	Los Angeles Clippers	Sophomore
2	3	G	Jeremy Lin	New York Knicks	Sophomore
3	5	G	Ricky Rubio	Minnesota Timberwolves	Rookie
4	7	F/C	Greg Monroe	Detroit Pistons	Sophomore
5	9	F	Markieff Morris	Phoenix Suns	Rookie
6	11	G	Kemba Walker	Charlotte Bobcats	Rookie
7	13	G	Landry Fields	New York Knicks	Sophomore
8	15	G	Norris Cole	Miami Heat	Rookie
Draw		G	Brandon Knight	Detroit Pistons	Rookie
Draw		F	Tristan Thompson	Cleveland Cavaliers	Rookie
Co-head Coach: Ron Adams (Chicago Bulls)
Co-head Coach: Steve Kerr
General Manager: Shaquille O'Neal

Team Chuck
Round	Pick	Pos.	Player	Team	R/S
1	2	G	Kyrie Irving	Cleveland Cavaliers	Rookie
2	4	C	DeMarcus Cousins	Sacramento Kings	Sophomore
3	6	G/F	Paul George	Indiana Pacers	Sophomore
4	8	F	Derrick Williams	Minnesota Timberwolves	Rookie
5	10	G/F	MarShon Brooks	New Jersey Nets	Rookie
6	12	G	John Wall	Washington Wizards	Sophomore
7	14	F	Gordon Hayward	Utah Jazz	Sophomore
8	16	F/C	Tiago Splitter^{INJ}	San Antonio Spurs	Sophomore
Draw		F	Kawhi Leonard^{DNP}	San Antonio Spurs	Rookie
Draw		G/F	Evan Turner	Philadelphia 76ers	Sophomore
–		F	Derrick Favors^{REP}	Utah Jazz	Sophomore
Co-head Coach: Maurice Cheeks (Oklahoma City Thunder)
Co-head Coach: Mike Fratello
General Manager: Charles Barkley

^INJ Tiago Splitter was unable to participate due to injury.
^DNP Kawhi Leonard did not play due to a strained right calf.
^REP Derrick Favors was named Tiago Splitter's replacement.

TNT

February 24
9:00 p.m. ET

Boxscore

Team Shaq 133, Team Chuck 146
Scoring by half: 65–77, 68–69
Pts: Tristan Thompson 20; Rebs: Greg Monroe 10; Asts: Kemba Walker 10	Pts: Kyrie Irving 34; Rebs: DeMarcus Cousins, Evan Turner 11; Asts: Kyrie Irving 9

Amway Center, Orlando, Florida
Attendance: 17,125
Referees:
- #75 Eric Dalen
- #68 Marat Kogut
- #35 Kane Fitzgerald

=== 2013 game ===
Team Shaq
Round	Pick	Pos.	Player	Team	R/S
1	1	G	Damian Lillard	Portland Trail Blazers	Rookie
2	3	G	Kyrie Irving	Cleveland Cavaliers	Sophomore
3	5	C	Andre Drummond^{INJ}	Detroit Pistons	Rookie
4	7	G	Klay Thompson	Golden State Warriors	Sophomore
5	9	F	Harrison Barnes	Golden State Warriors	Rookie
6	11	F	Chandler Parsons	Houston Rockets	Sophomore
7	13	G	Dion Waiters	Cleveland Cavaliers	Rookie
8	15	F	Michael Kidd-Gilchrist	Charlotte Bobcats	Rookie
Draw		C	Tyler Zeller	Cleveland Cavaliers	Rookie
Draw		G	Kemba Walker	Charlotte Bobcats	Sophomore
—		F	Andrew Nicholson^{REP}	Orlando Magic	Rookie
Head coach: David Fizdale (Miami Heat)
General manager: Shaquille O'Neal

Team Chuck
Round	Pick	Pos.	Player	Team	R/S
1	2	F/C	Anthony Davis	New Orleans Hornets	Rookie
2	4	F	Kenneth Faried	Denver Nuggets	Sophomore
3	6	F	Kawhi Leonard	San Antonio Spurs	Sophomore
4	8	G	Bradley Beal	Washington Wizards	Rookie
5	10	G	Ricky Rubio	Minnesota Timberwolves	Sophomore
6	12	F/C	Tristan Thompson	Cleveland Cavaliers	Sophomore
7	14	C	Nikola Vučević	Orlando Magic	Sophomore
8	16	G	Brandon Knight	Detroit Pistons	Sophomore
Draw		G	Isaiah Thomas	Sacramento Kings	Sophomore
Draw		G	Alexey Shved	Minnesota Timberwolves	Rookie
Head coach: Mike Budenholzer (San Antonio Spurs)
General manager: Charles Barkley

^INJ Andre Drummond was unable to participate due to injury.
^REP Andrew Nicholson was named Andre Drummond's replacement.

TNT

February 15
9:00 p.m. ET

Boxscore

Team Shaq 135, Team Chuck 163
Scoring by half: 66–90, 69–73
Pts: Kyrie Irving 32; Rebs: Kyrie Irving 6 Asts: Kemba Walker 8	Pts: Kenneth Faried 40; Rebs: Faried, Thompson 10; Asts: Rubio, Thomas 10

Toyota Center, Houston
Attendance: 16,101
Referees:
- #66 Haywoode Workman
- #58 Josh Tiven
- #60 James Williams

=== 2014 game ===
Team Webber
Round	Pick	Pos.	Player	Team	R/S
1	1	F/C	Anthony Davis	New Orleans Pelicans	Sophomore
2	4	G	Michael Carter-Williams	Philadelphia 76ers	Rookie
3	6	G	Tim Hardaway Jr.	New York Knicks	Rookie
4	8	G	Trey Burke	Utah Jazz	Rookie
5	10	F	Jared Sullinger	Boston Celtics	Sophomore
6	12	F	Mason Plumlee	Brooklyn Nets	Rookie
7	14	G	Victor Oladipo	Orlando Magic	Rookie
Draw		C	Steven Adams	Oklahoma City Thunder	Rookie
Draw		C	Kelly Olynyk	Boston Celtics	Rookie
Head coach: Rex Kalamian (Oklahoma City Thunder)
General manager: Chris Webber

Team Hill
Round	Pick	Pos.	Player	Team	R/S
1	2	G	Damian Lillard	Portland Trail Blazers	Sophomore
2	3	G	Bradley Beal	Washington Wizards	Sophomore
3	5	C	Andre Drummond	Detroit Pistons	Sophomore
4	7	F	Harrison Barnes	Golden State Warriors	Sophomore
5	9	F	Terrence Jones	Houston Rockets	Sophomore
6	11	F/G	Giannis Antetokounmpo	Milwaukee Bucks	Rookie
7	13	C	Jonas Valančiūnas	Toronto Raptors	Sophomore
Draw		G	Dion Waiters	Cleveland Cavaliers	Sophomore
Draw		F/C	Pero Antić^{INJ}	Atlanta Hawks	Rookie
—		C	Miles Plumlee^{REP}	Phoenix Suns	Sophomore
Head coach: Nate McMillan (Indiana Pacers)
General manager: Grant Hill

^INJ Pero Antić was unable to participate due to injury.
^REP Miles Plumlee was named Pero Antić's replacement.

TNT

February 14
9:00 p.m. ET

Boxscore

Team Webber 136, Team Hill 142
Scoring by half: 66–67, 70–75
Pts: Tim Hardaway Jr. 36; Rebs: Anthony Davis 8 Asts: Michael Carter-Williams 9	Pts: Dion Waiters 31; Rebs: Andre Drummond 25; Asts: Dion Waiters 7

New Orleans Arena, New Orleans
Attendance: 14,727
Referees:
- #70 Brent Barnaky
- #54 Nick Buchert
- #34 Kevin Cutler

=== 2015 game ===
Team World
Pos.	Nat.	Player	Team	R/S
C	(New Zealand)	Steven Adams^{INJ1}	Oklahoma City Thunder	Sophomore
G/F	(Greece)	Giannis Antetokounmpo	Milwaukee Bucks	Sophomore
F	(Croatia)	Bojan Bogdanović	Brooklyn Nets	Rookie
C	(Senegal)	Gorgui Dieng	Minnesota Timberwolves	Sophomore
G	(Australia)	Danté Exum	Utah Jazz	Rookie
C	(France)	Rudy Gobert	Utah Jazz	Sophomore
F	(Montenegro)	Nikola Mirotić	Chicago Bulls	Rookie
C/F	(Canada)	Kelly Olynyk^{INJ3}	Boston Celtics	Sophomore
G	(Germany)	Dennis Schröder	Atlanta Hawks	Sophomore
F/G	(Canada)	Andrew Wiggins	Minnesota Timberwolves	Rookie
C	(Bosnia and Herzegovina)	Jusuf Nurkić^{REP1}^{/}^{OUT}	Denver Nuggets	Rookie
G	(Australia)	Matthew Dellavedova^{REP3}	Cleveland Cavaliers	Sophomore
F	(Greece)	Kostas Papanikolaou^{REP4}	Houston Rockets	Rookie
Head coach: Kenny Atkinson (Atlanta Hawks)

Team USA
Pos.	Player	Team	R/S
G	Trey Burke	Utah Jazz	Sophomore
G	Kentavious Caldwell-Pope	Detroit Pistons	Sophomore
G	Michael Carter-Williams^{INJ2}	Philadelphia 76ers	Sophomore
G	Zach LaVine	Minnesota Timberwolves	Rookie
G/F	Shabazz Muhammad	Minnesota Timberwolves	Sophomore
C	Nerlens Noel	Philadelphia 76ers	Rookie
G	Victor Oladipo	Orlando Magic	Sophomore
G	Elfrid Payton	Orlando Magic	Rookie
C/F	Mason Plumlee	Brooklyn Nets	Sophomore
C/F	Cody Zeller	Charlotte Hornets	Sophomore
F	Robert Covington^{REP2}	Philadelphia 76ers	Sophomore
Head coach: Alvin Gentry (Golden State Warriors)

^INJ1 Adams was unable to participate due to injury.
^REP1 Nurkić was named as Adams' replacement.
^INJ2 Carter-Williams was unable to participate due to injuries.
^REP2 Covington was named as Carter-Williams' replacement.
^INJ3 Olynyk was unable to participate due to injury.
^REP3 Dellavedova was named as Olynyk's replacement.
^OUT Nurkić decided to not participate for personal reasons.
^REP4 Papanikolaou was named as Nurkić's replacement.

TNT

February 13
9:00 p.m. ET

Boxscore

Team World 121, Team USA 112
Scoring by half: 69–67, 52–45
Pts: Andrew Wiggins 22; Rebs: Rudy Gobert 12; Asts: Dennis Schröder 9	Pts: Oladipo, LaVine 22; Rebs: Mason Plumlee 9 Asts: Oladipo, Burke 4

Barclays Center, Brooklyn, New York
Attendance: 15,451
Referees:
- #73 Tre Maddox
- #77 Karl Lane
- #79 Kevin Scott

The World team won against the U.S. 121–112 at the Rising Stars Challenge at All-Star weekend. Canada's Andrew Wiggins scored 22 points, and Rudy Gobert added 18 points, 12 rebounds and three blocks. Brooklyn's Bojan Bogdanovic of Croatia, and Chicago's Nikola Mirotić of Montenegro added 16 points each for the World team. Victor Oladipo of the Orlando Magic and Zach LaVine of the Minnesota Timberwolves led the U.S. team with 22 points each. Andrew Wiggins, the 2014 NBA draft 1st overall pick, won the game's MVP award.

=== 2016 game ===
To celebrate the first time the NBA holds the All-Star game outside of the US, the game makes the World Team the home team instead of Team USA.

Team USA
Pos.	Player	Team	R/S
G	Jordan Clarkson	Los Angeles Lakers	Sophomore
G	Rodney Hood	Utah Jazz	Sophomore
G	Zach LaVine	Minnesota Timberwolves	Sophomore
C/F	Nerlens Noel^{INJ1}	Philadelphia 76ers	Sophomore
C	Jahlil Okafor	Philadelphia 76ers	Rookie
F	Jabari Parker	Milwaukee Bucks	Sophomore
G	Elfrid Payton	Orlando Magic	Sophomore
G	D'Angelo Russell	Los Angeles Lakers	Rookie
G	Marcus Smart	Boston Celtics	Sophomore
C	Karl-Anthony Towns	Minnesota Timberwolves	Rookie
G	Devin Booker^{REP1}	Phoenix Suns	Rookie
Head coach: Larry Drew (Cleveland Cavaliers)

Team World
Pos.	Nat.	Player	Team	R/S
F/G	(Croatia)	Bojan Bogdanović	Brooklyn Nets	Sophomore
C	(Switzerland)	Clint Capela	Houston Rockets	Sophomore
G/F	(Croatia)	Mario Hezonja	Orlando Magic	Rookie
C	(Serbia)	Nikola Jokić	Denver Nuggets	Rookie
F	(Montenegro)	Nikola Mirotić^{INJ2}	Chicago Bulls	Sophomore
G	(Democratic Republic of the Congo)	Emmanuel Mudiay	Denver Nuggets	Rookie
G	(Brazil)	Raul Neto	Utah Jazz	Rookie
F/C	(Latvia)	Kristaps Porziņģis	New York Knicks	Rookie
F/C	(Canada)	Dwight Powell	Dallas Mavericks	Sophomore
F/G	(Canada)	Andrew Wiggins	Minnesota Timberwolves	Sophomore
F	(Canada)	Trey Lyles^{REP2}	Utah Jazz	Rookie
Head coach: (Italy) Ettore Messina (San Antonio Spurs)

^INJ1 Nerlens Noel was unable to participate due to injury.
^REP1 Devin Booker was named as Noel's replacement.
^INJ2 Nikola Mirotić was unable to participate due to injury.
^REP2 Trey Lyles was named as Mirotić's replacement.

TNT

February 12
9:00 pm ET

Boxscore

Team USA 157, Team World 154
Scoring by half: 88–79, 69–75
Pts: Zach LaVine 30; Rebs: LaVine, Towns 7 Asts: D'Angelo Russell 7	Pts: Porziņģis, Mudiay 30; Rebs: Dwight Powell 11; Asts: Emmanuel Mudiay 10

Air Canada Centre, Toronto
Attendance: 18,298
Referees:
- #72 J. T. Orr
- #52 Scott Twardoski
- #46 Ben Taylor

Team USA won 157–154 in the highest scoring game in Rising Stars Challenge history. Zach LaVine was named MVP, leading all of the USA team with 30 points while also recording 7 rebounds and 4 assists. Jordan Clarkson, D'Angelo Russell, and Devin Booker all scored over 20 points, with Russell also recording 7 assists. Kristaps Porziņģis and Emmanuel Mudiay led the way for Team World with 30 points each, with Andrew Wiggins also scoring 29 points.

=== 2017 game ===
Team World
Pos.	Nat.	Player	Team	R/S
C	(Cameroon)	Joel Embiid^{INJ1}	Philadelphia 76ers	Rookie
G	(Australia)	Danté Exum	Utah Jazz	Sophomore
G	(The Bahamas)	Buddy Hield	New Orleans Pelicans	Rookie
C/F	(Serbia)	Nikola Jokić	Denver Nuggets	Sophomore
F	(Canada)	Trey Lyles	Utah Jazz	Sophomore
G	(Democratic Republic of the Congo)	Emmanuel Mudiay^{INJ2}	Denver Nuggets	Sophomore
G	(Canada)	Jamal Murray	Denver Nuggets	Rookie
F/C	(Latvia)	Kristaps Porziņģis	New York Knicks	Sophomore
F	(Lithuania)	Domantas Sabonis	Oklahoma City Thunder	Rookie
F	(Croatia)	Dario Šarić	Philadelphia 76ers	Rookie
G	(Spain)	Álex Abrines^{REP1}	Oklahoma City Thunder	Rookie
C	(Spain)	Willy Hernangómez^{REP2}	New York Knicks	Rookie
Head coach: Mike Brown (Golden State Warriors)

Team USA
Pos.	Player	Team	R/S
G	Devin Booker	Phoenix Suns	Sophomore
G	Malcolm Brogdon	Milwaukee Bucks	Rookie
F	Marquese Chriss	Phoenix Suns	Rookie
F	Brandon Ingram	Los Angeles Lakers	Rookie
C	Frank Kaminsky	Charlotte Hornets	Sophomore
C	Jahlil Okafor	Philadelphia 76ers	Sophomore
G	D'Angelo Russell	Los Angeles Lakers	Sophomore
G	Jonathon Simmons	San Antonio Spurs	Sophomore
C	Karl-Anthony Towns	Minnesota Timberwolves	Sophomore
C/F	Myles Turner	Indiana Pacers	Sophomore
Head coach: Jay Larrañaga (Boston Celtics)

^INJ1 Embiid was unable to participate due to a knee injury.
^REP1 Abrines was named as Embiid's replacement.
^INJ2 Mudiay was unable to participate due to a back injury.
^REP2 Hernangómez was named as Mudiay's replacement.

TNT

February 17
9:00 pm ET

Boxscore

Team World 150, Team USA 141
Scoring by half: 77–66, 73–75
Pts: Jamal Murray (36); Rebs: Nikola Jokić (11); Asts: Jamal Murray (11)	Pts: Frank Kaminsky (33); Rebs: Karl-Anthony Towns (11); Asts: Devin Booker (6)

Smoothie King Center, New Orleans

=== 2018 game ===
Team World
Pos.	Nat.	Player	Team	R/S
G	(Serbia)	Bogdan Bogdanović	Sacramento Kings	Rookie
G/F	(Canada)	Dillon Brooks	Memphis Grizzlies	Rookie
C	(Cameroon)	Joel Embiid	Philadelphia 76ers	Sophomore
G	(The Bahamas)	Buddy Hield	Sacramento Kings	Sophomore
F	(Finland)	Lauri Markkanen	Chicago Bulls	Rookie
G	(Canada)	Jamal Murray	Denver Nuggets	Sophomore
G	(France)	Frank Ntilikina	New York Knicks	Rookie
F/C	(Lithuania)	Domantas Sabonis	Indiana Pacers	Sophomore
F	(Croatia)	Dario Šarić	Philadelphia 76ers	Sophomore
G/F	(Australia)	Ben Simmons	Philadelphia 76ers	Rookie
Head coach: (Armenia) Rex Kalamian (Toronto Raptors)

Team USA
Pos.	Player	Team	R/S
G	Lonzo Ball^{INJ2}	Los Angeles Lakers	Rookie
G	Malcolm Brogdon^{INJ1}	Milwaukee Bucks	Sophomore
G/F	Jaylen Brown	Boston Celtics	Sophomore
F/C	John Collins	Atlanta Hawks	Rookie
G	Kris Dunn	Chicago Bulls	Sophomore
G/F	Brandon Ingram	Los Angeles Lakers	Sophomore
F	Kyle Kuzma	Los Angeles Lakers	Rookie
G	Donovan Mitchell	Utah Jazz	Rookie
G	Dennis Smith Jr.	Dallas Mavericks	Rookie
F	Jayson Tatum	Boston Celtics	Rookie
F	Taurean Prince^{REP1}	Atlanta Hawks	Sophomore
G	De'Aaron Fox^{REP2}	Sacramento Kings	Rookie
Head coach: Roy Rogers (Houston Rockets)

^INJ1 Malcolm Brogdon was unable to participate due to a leg injury.
^REP1 Taurean Prince was selected as Malcolm Brogdon's replacement.
^INJ2 Lonzo Ball was unable to participate due to a knee injury.
^REP2 De'Aaron Fox was selected as Lonzo Ball's replacement.

TNT

February 16
9:00 pm ET

Boxscore

Team World 155, Team USA 124
Scoring by half: 78–59, 77–65
Pts: Buddy Hield 29; Rebs: Domantas Sabonis 11; Asts: Ben Simmons 13	Pts: Jaylen Brown 35; Rebs: Jaylen Brown 10; Asts: Donovan Mitchell 7

Staples Center, Los Angeles
Attendance: 19,060
Referees:
- #21 Dedric Taylor
- #7 Lauren Holtkamp
- #39 Tyler Ford

=== 2019 game ===
Team World
Pos.	Nat.	Player	Team	R/S
F	(United Kingdom)	OG Anunoby	Toronto Raptors	Sophomore
C	(The Bahamas)	Deandre Ayton	Phoenix Suns	Rookie
G	(Serbia)	Bogdan Bogdanović	Sacramento Kings	Sophomore
G/F	(Slovenia)	Luka Dončić	Dallas Mavericks	Rookie
G	(Canada)	Shai Gilgeous-Alexander	Los Angeles Clippers	Rookie
F	(Latvia)	Rodions Kurucs	Brooklyn Nets	Rookie
F	(Finland)	Lauri Markkanen	Chicago Bulls	Sophomore
G	(Nigeria)	Josh Okogie	Minnesota Timberwolves	Rookie
G/F	(Turkey)	Cedi Osman	Cleveland Cavaliers	Sophomore
G/F	(Australia)	Ben Simmons	Philadelphia 76ers	Sophomore
Head coach: Wes Unseld Jr. (Denver Nuggets)
Assistant coach: (Germany) Dirk Nowitzki (Dallas Mavericks)

Team USA
Pos.	Player	Team	R/S
C	Jarrett Allen	Brooklyn Nets	Sophomore
F	Marvin Bagley III	Sacramento Kings	Rookie
G	Lonzo Ball^{INJ}	Los Angeles Lakers	Sophomore
F	John Collins	Atlanta Hawks	Sophomore
G	De'Aaron Fox	Sacramento Kings	Sophomore
F/C	Jaren Jackson Jr.	Memphis Grizzlies	Rookie
F	Kevin Knox II^{REP}	New York Knicks	Rookie
F	Kyle Kuzma	Los Angeles Lakers	Sophomore
G	Donovan Mitchell	Utah Jazz	Sophomore
F	Jayson Tatum	Boston Celtics	Sophomore
G	Trae Young	Atlanta Hawks	Rookie
Head coach: Darvin Ham (Milwaukee Bucks)
Assistant coach: Kyrie Irving (Boston Celtics)

^INJ Lonzo Ball was unable to participate due to a left ankle injury.
^REP Kevin Knox was selected as Lonzo Ball's replacement.

TNT

February 15
9:00 pm ET

Boxscore

Team World 144, Team USA 161
Scoring by half: 71–83, 73–78
Pts: Ben Simmons 28; Rebs: Deandre Ayton 8 Asts: Luka Dončić 9	Pts: Kyle Kuzma 35; Rebs: Jayson Tatum 9 Asts: De'Aaron Fox 16

Spectrum Center, Charlotte, North Carolina
Referees:
- #27 Mitchell Ervin
- #50 Gediminas Petraitis
- #51 Aaron Smith

=== 2020 game ===
Team World
Pos.	Nat.	Player	Team	R/S
G	(Canada)	Nickeil Alexander-Walker	New Orleans Pelicans	Rookie
C	(The Bahamas)	Deandre Ayton^{INJ3}	Phoenix Suns	Sophomore
G/F	(Canada)	RJ Barrett	New York Knicks	Rookie
F	(Canada)	Brandon Clarke	Memphis Grizzlies	Rookie
G/F	(Slovenia)	Luka Dončić	Dallas Mavericks	Sophomore
G	(Canada)	Shai Gilgeous-Alexander	Oklahoma City Thunder	Sophomore
F	(Japan)	Rui Hachimura	Washington Wizards	Rookie
G	(Nigeria)	Josh Okogie	Minnesota Timberwolves	Sophomore
G/F	(Ukraine)	Svi Mykhailiuk	Detroit Pistons	Sophomore
C	(Germany)	Moritz Wagner	Washington Wizards	Sophomore
F	(Italy)	Nicolò Melli^{REP3}	New Orleans Pelicans	Rookie
Head coach: Adrian Griffin (Toronto Raptors)

Team USA
Pos.	Player	Team	R/S
F	Miles Bridges	Charlotte Hornets	Sophomore
G	Devonte' Graham	Charlotte Hornets	Sophomore
C	Wendell Carter Jr.^{INJ1}	Chicago Bulls	Sophomore
G	Tyler Herro^{INJ2}	Miami Heat	Rookie
G	Ja Morant	Memphis Grizzlies	Rookie
F	Jaren Jackson Jr.	Memphis Grizzlies	Sophomore
F	Zion Williamson^{REP1}	New Orleans Pelicans	Rookie
G	Kendrick Nunn	Miami Heat	Rookie
F	Eric Paschall	Golden State Warriors	Rookie
F	P. J. Washington	Charlotte Hornets	Rookie
G	Trae Young	Atlanta Hawks	Sophomore
G	Collin Sexton^{REP2}	Cleveland Cavaliers	Sophomore
Head coach: Phil Handy (Los Angeles Lakers)

^INJ1 Wendell Carter Jr. was unable to participate due to a right ankle injury.
^REP1 Zion Williamson was selected as Wendell Carter Jr.'s replacement.
^INJ2 Tyler Herro was unable to participate due to a sore right ankle.
^REP2 Collin Sexton was selected as Tyler Herro's replacement.
^INJ3 Deandre Ayton was unable to participate due to a sore left ankle.
^REP3 Nicolò Melli was selected as Deandre Ayton's replacement.

TNT

February 14
9:00 pm ET

Boxscore

Team World 131, Team USA 151
Scoring by half: 81–71, 50–80
Pts: RJ Barrett 27; Rebs: Brandon Clarke 8 Asts: three player 5	Pts: Eric Paschall 23; Rebs: Jaren Jackson Jr. 7 Asts: Trae Young 7

United Center, Chicago
Referees:
- #54 Ray Acosta
- #64 Justin Van Duyne
- #62 JB DeRosa

=== 2021 roster ===
Due to the downsizing of the All-Star Game due to the COVID-19 pandemic, the NBA All-Star Weekend was not held, and the Rising Stars Challenge was not played. The NBA still named the Rising Stars rosters of first- and second-year players.

Team World
Pos.	Nat.	Player	Team	R/S
F	(Nigeria)	Precious Achiuwa	Miami Heat	Rookie
G	(Canada)	Nickeil Alexander-Walker	New Orleans Pelicans	Sophomore
F	(Israel)	Deni Avdija	Washington Wizards	Rookie
G/F	(Canada)	RJ Barrett	New York Knicks	Sophomore
G	(Argentina)	Facundo Campazzo	Denver Nuggets	Rookie
F	(Canada)	Brandon Clarke	Memphis Grizzlies	Sophomore
G	(Canada)	Luguentz Dort	Oklahoma City Thunder	Sophomore
F	(Japan)	Rui Hachimura	Washington Wizards	Sophomore
G	(France)	Théo Maledon	Oklahoma City Thunder	Rookie
G	(Canada)	Mychal Mulder	Golden State Warriors	Sophomore

Team USA
Pos.	Player	Team	R/S
G	LaMelo Ball	Charlotte Hornets	Rookie
G	Anthony Edwards	Minnesota Timberwolves	Rookie
G	Tyrese Haliburton	Sacramento Kings	Rookie
G	Tyler Herro	Miami Heat	Sophomore
F	De'Andre Hunter	Atlanta Hawks	Sophomore
G/F	Keldon Johnson	San Antonio Spurs	Sophomore
G	Ja Morant	Memphis Grizzlies	Sophomore
F	Michael Porter Jr.	Denver Nuggets	Sophomore
F	Zion Williamson	New Orleans Pelicans	Sophomore
C	James Wiseman	Golden State Warriors	Rookie

=== 2022 roster ===
Team Barry
Pos.	Player	Team	R/S/P
G	Cade Cunningham	Detroit Pistons	Rookie
F	Dyson Daniels	NBA G League Ignite	Prospect
F	Evan Mobley	Cleveland Cavaliers	Rookie
G/F	Isaac Okoro	Cleveland Cavaliers	Sophomore
C	Alperen Şengün	Houston Rockets	Rookie
F	Jae'Sean Tate	Houston Rockets	Sophomore
F	Franz Wagner	Orlando Magic	Rookie
Honorary coach: Rick Barry
Head coach: Bryan Gates (Phoenix Suns)

Team Isiah
Pos.	Player	Team	R/S/P
F/C	Precious Achiuwa	Toronto Raptors	Sophomore
G/F	Desmond Bane	Memphis Grizzlies	Sophomore
F	Saddiq Bey	Detroit Pistons	Sophomore
G	Anthony Edwards	Minnesota Timberwolves	Sophomore
G	Tyrese Haliburton	Indiana Pacers	Sophomore
G	Jaden Hardy	NBA G League Ignite	Prospect
C	Isaiah Stewart	Detroit Pistons	Sophomore
Honorary coach: Isiah Thomas
Head coach: Kevin Young (Phoenix Suns)

Team Payton
Pos.	Player	Team	R/S/P
G	LaMelo Ball	Charlotte Hornets	Sophomore
F	Scottie Barnes	Toronto Raptors	Rookie
G	Ayo Dosunmu	Chicago Bulls	Rookie
G	Chris Duarte^{INJ1}	Indiana Pacers	Rookie
G	Scoot Henderson	NBA G League Ignite	Prospect
F	Jaden McDaniels	Minnesota Timberwolves	Sophomore
G	Davion Mitchell^{INJ2}	Sacramento Kings	Rookie
F	Jonathan Kuminga^{REP1}	Golden State Warriors	Rookie
G	Bones Hyland^{REP2}	Denver Nuggets	Rookie
Honorary coach: Gary Payton
Head coach: Chris Quinn (Miami Heat)

Team Worthy
Pos.	Player	Team	R/S/P
G	Cole Anthony	Orlando Magic	Sophomore
G/F	MarJon Beauchamp	NBA G League Ignite	Prospect
G	Josh Giddey	Oklahoma City Thunder	Rookie
G	Jalen Green	Houston Rockets	Rookie
C	Herbert Jones	New Orleans Pelicans	Rookie
G	Tyrese Maxey	Philadelphia 76ers	Sophomore
G	Jalen Suggs	Orlando Magic	Rookie
Honorary coach: James Worthy
Head coach: Malik Allen (Miami Heat)

^INJ1 Chris Duarte was unable to participate due to a toe injury.
^REP1 Jonathan Kuminga was selected as Chris Duarte's replacement.
^INJ2 Davion Mitchell was unable to participate due to a hand injury.
^REP2 Bones Hyland was selected as Davion Mitchell's replacement.

Semifinals
Team Isiah	50
Team Worthy	49
Team Barry	50
Team Payton	48

Final
Team Isiah	20
Team Barry	25

=== 2023 roster ===
Team Pau
Pos.	Player	Team	R/S/P
G	Jose Alvarado	New Orleans Pelicans	Sophomore
F	Paolo Banchero	Orlando Magic	Rookie
F	Scottie Barnes	Toronto Raptors	Sophomore
G	Jaden Ivey	Detroit Pistons	Rookie
G	Bennedict Mathurin	Indiana Pacers	Rookie
F	Keegan Murray	Sacramento Kings	Rookie
G	Andrew Nembhard	Indiana Pacers	Rookie
Honorary coach: Pau Gasol
Head coach: David Adelman

Team Joakim
Pos.	Player	Team	R/S/P
C	Jalen Duren^{INJ1}	Detroit Pistons	Rookie
F	Tari Eason^{REP1}	Houston Rockets	Rookie
G	Josh Giddey	Oklahoma City Thunder	Sophomore
G	Quentin Grimes	New York Knicks	Sophomore
F	Evan Mobley	Cleveland Cavaliers	Sophomore
F	Jabari Smith Jr.	Houston Rockets	Rookie
F	Jeremy Sochan	San Antonio Spurs	Rookie
G	Jalen Williams	Oklahoma City Thunder	Rookie
Honorary coach: Joakim Noah
Head coach: Ben Sullivan

Team Deron
Pos.	Player	Team	R/S/P
G	Ayo Dosunmu^{REP2}	Chicago Bulls	Sophomore
G	Jalen Green^{INJ2}	Houston Rockets	Sophomore
G	AJ Griffin	Atlanta Hawks	Rookie
G	Bones Hyland	Los Angeles Clippers	Sophomore
C	Walker Kessler	Utah Jazz	Rookie
F	Trey Murphy III	New Orleans Pelicans	Sophomore
C	Alperen Şengün	Houston Rockets	Sophomore
F	Franz Wagner	Orlando Magic	Sophomore
Honorary coach: Deron Williams
Head coach: Damon Stoudamire

Team Jason
Pos.	Player	Team	R/S/P
G	Sidy Cissoko	G League Ignite	Prospect
G	Scoot Henderson	G League Ignite	Prospect
F	Mojave King	G League Ignite	Prospect
F	Kenneth Lofton Jr.	Memphis Hustle	Rookie
G	Mac McClung	Philadelphia 76ers	Sophomore
F	Leonard Miller	G League Ignite	Prospect
G	Scotty Pippen Jr.	South Bay Lakers	Rookie
Honorary coach: Jason Terry
Head coach: Ryan Saunders

^INJ1 Jalen Duren was unable to participate due to injury.
^REP1 Tari Eason was selected as Jalen Duren's replacement.
^INJ2 Jalen Green was unable to participate due to injury.
^REP2 Ayo Dosunmu was selected as Jalen Green's replacement.

Semifinals
Team Pau	40
Team Deron	25
Team Joakim	40
Team Jason	32

Final
Team Pau	25
Team Joakim	20

=== 2024 roster ===
Team Pau
Pos.	Player	Team	R/S/P
F	Victor Wembanyama	San Antonio Spurs	Rookie
F	Brandon Miller	Charlotte Hornets	Rookie
F	Jaime Jaquez Jr.	Miami Heat	Rookie
F	Jabari Smith Jr.	Houston Rockets	Sophomore
G	Brandin Podziemski	Golden State Warriors	Rookie
G	Cason Wallace	Oklahoma City Thunder	Rookie
G	Bilal Coulibaly	Washington Wizards	Rookie
Honorary coach: Pau Gasol
Head coach: Micah Nori

Team Tamika
Pos.	Player	Team	R/S/P
F	Paolo Banchero	Orlando Magic	Sophomore
F	Keegan Murray	Sacramento Kings	Sophomore
G	Jaden Ivey	Detroit Pistons	Sophomore
G	Dyson Daniels^{INJ2}	New Orleans Pelicans	Sophomore
G	Vince Williams Jr.^{REP2}	Memphis Grizzlies	Sophomore
G	Scoot Henderson	Portland Trail Blazers	Rookie
G	Keyonte George	Utah Jazz	Rookie
C	Jalen Duren	Detroit Pistons	Sophomore
Honorary coach: Tamika Catchings
Head coach: Elston Turner

Team Jalen
Pos.	Player	Team	R/S/P
F	Chet Holmgren	Oklahoma City Thunder	Rookie
F	Dereck Lively II	Dallas Mavericks	Rookie
F	Jeremy Sochan^{REP1}	San Antonio Spurs	Sophomore
G	Jalen Williams	Oklahoma City Thunder	Sophomore
G	Bennedict Mathurin	Indiana Pacers	Sophomore
G	Shaedon Sharpe^{INJ1}	Portland Trail Blazers	Sophomore
G	Jordan Hawkins	New Orleans Pelicans	Rookie
C	Walker Kessler	Utah Jazz	Sophomore
Honorary coach: Jalen Rose
Head coach: Joe Prunty

Team Detlef
Pos.	Player	Team	R/S/P
F	Izan Almansa	G League Ignite	Prospect
F	Matas Buzelis	G League Ignite	Prospect
F	Ron Holland^{INJ3}	G League Ignite	Prospect
F	Tyler Smith	G League Ignite	Prospect
F	Oscar Tshiebwe	Indiana Mad Ants	Rookie
F	Emoni Bates^{REP3}	Cleveland Charge	Rookie
G	Mac McClung	Osceola Magic	Third-year player
G	Alondes Williams	Sioux Falls Skyforce	Sophomore
Honorary coach: Detlef Schrempf
Head coach: Patrick Mutombo

^INJ1 Shaedon Sharpe was unable to participate due to injury.
^REP1 Jeremy Sochan was selected as Shaedon Sharpe's replacement.
^INJ2 Dyson Daniels was unable to participate due to injury.
^REP2 Vince Williams Jr. was selected as Dyson Daniels's replacement.
^INJ3 Ron Holland was unable to participate due to injury.
^REP3 Emoni Bates was selected as Ron Holland's replacement.

Semifinals
Team Jalen	40
Team Tamika	35
Team Detlef	41
Team Pau	36

Final
Team Jalen	25
Team Detlef	13

=== 2025 roster ===
Team Chris
Pos.	Player	Team	R/S/P
G	Stephon Castle	San Antonio Spurs	Rookies
F	Ryan Dunn	Phoenix Suns	Rookies
F	Zach Edey	Memphis Grizzlies	Rookies
G	Keyonte George	Utah Jazz	Sophomores
F	Trayce Jackson-Davis	Golden State Warriors	Sophomores
G	Dalton Knecht	Los Angeles Lakers	Rookies
G	Jaylen Wells	Memphis Grizzlies	Rookies
Honorary coach: Chris Mullin
Head coach:

Team Tim
Pos.	Player	Team	R/S/P
G	Anthony Black	Orlando Magic	Sophomores
F	Tristan da Silva	Orlando Magic	Rookies
G	Gradey Dick	Toronto Raptors	Sophomores
F	Jaime Jaquez Jr.	Miami Heat	Sophomores
F	Zaccharie Risacher	Atlanta Hawks	Rookies
F	Alex Sarr	Washington Wizards	Rookies
G	Brandin Podziemski	Golden State Warriors	Sophomores
Honorary coach: Tim Hardaway
Head coach:

Team Mitch
Pos.	Player	Team	R/S/P
F	Matas Buzelis	Chicago Bulls	Rookies
F	Toumani Camara	Portland Trail Blazers	Sophomores
G	Bub Carrington	Washington Wizards	Rookies
G	Bilal Coulibaly	Washington Wizards	Sophomores
G	Scoot Henderson	Portland Trail Blazers	Sophomores
G	Amen Thompson	Houston Rockets	Sophomores
F	Ausar Thompson	Detroit Pistons	Sophomores
Honorary coach: Mitch Richmond
Head coach:

Team G League
Pos.	Player	Team	R/S/P
G	JD Davison	Maine Celtics	G League
G	Mac McClung	Osceola Magic	G League
F	Bryce McGowens	Rip City Remix	G League
F	Leonard Miller	Iowa Wolves	G League
G	Dink Pate	Mexico City Capitanes	G League
G	Reed Sheppard	Rio Grande Valley Vipers	G League
G	Pat Spencer	Santa Cruz Warriors	G League
Honorary coach: Jeremy Lin
Head coach:

^INJ1 Jared McCain was unable to participate due to injury.
^REP1 Ryan Dunn was selected as Jared McCain's replacement.
^INJ2 Yves Missi was unable to participate due to injury.
^REP2 Matas Buzelis was selected as Yves Missi's replacement.
^INJ3 Dereck Lively II was unable to participate due to injury.
^REP3 Anthony Black was selected as Dereck Lively II's replacement.
^INJ4 Brandon Miller was unable to participate due to injury.
^REP4 Toumani Camara was selected as Brandon Miller's replacement.
^NOTE1 Victor Wembanyama was unable to participate due to NBA All-Star Game.
^REP5 Ausar Thompson was selected as Victor Wembanyama's replacement.

Semifinals
Team Chris	40
Team Tim	34
Team G League	40
Team Mitch	39

Final
Team Chris	25
Team G League	14

=== 2026 roster ===
Team Austin
Pos.	Player	Team	R/S/P
G	Sean East II	Salt Lake City Stars	G League
C	Yang Hansen	Rip City Remix	G League
G/F	Ron Harper Jr.	Maine Celtics	G League
G	Alijah Martin	Raptors 905	G League
G	Tristen Newton	Rio Grande Valley Vipers	G League
C	Yanic Konan Niederhäuser	San Diego Clippers	G League
G	Jahmir Young^{REP5}	Sioux Falls Skyforce	G League
Injured
F	David Jones Garcia^{INJ1}	Austin Spurs	G League
G	Mac McClung^{REP1} ^{INJ5}	Windy City Bulls	G League
Honorary coach: Austin Rivers
Head coach: Fred Vinson

Team T-Mac
Pos.	Player	Team	R/S/P
G	Bub Carrington^{REP4}	Washington Wizards	Sophomores
G	Tre Johnson	Washington Wizards	Rookies
G/F	Kon Knueppel	Charlotte Hornets	Rookies
F	Zaccharie Risacher^{REP2}	Atlanta Hawks	Sophomores
G	Cam Spencer	Memphis Grizzlies	Sophomores
F	Jaylon Tyson	Cleveland Cavaliers	Sophomores
C	Kel'el Ware	Miami Heat	Sophomores
Injured
G	Ajay Mitchell^{INJ2}	Oklahoma City Thunder	Sophomores
C	Alex Sarr^{INJ4}	Washington Wizards	Sophomores
Honorary coach: Tracy McGrady
Head coach: Luke Walton

Team Melo
Pos.	Player	Team	R/S/P
F	Ace Bailey^{REP3}	Utah Jazz	Rookies
G	Stephon Castle	San Antonio Spurs	Sophomores
C	Donovan Clingan	Portland Trail Blazers	Sophomores
G	Jeremiah Fears	New Orleans Pelicans	Rookies
G	Dylan Harper	San Antonio Spurs	Rookies
C/F	Collin Murray-Boyles	Toronto Raptors	Rookies
G	Reed Sheppard	Houston Rockets	Sophomores
Injured
F	Cooper Flagg^{INJ3}	Dallas Mavericks	Rookies
Honorary coach: Carmelo Anthony
Head coach:

Team Vince
Pos.	Player	Team	R/S/P
F	Carter Bryant^{REP6}	San Antonio Spurs	Rookie
F	Matas Buzelis	Chicago Bulls	Sophomores
G	Egor Dëmin	Brooklyn Nets	Rookies
G	V. J. Edgecombe	Philadelphia 76ers	Rookies
F	Kyshawn George	Washington Wizards	Sophomores
C	Derik Queen	New Orleans Pelicans	Rookies
F	Jaylen Wells	Memphis Grizzlies	Sophomores
Injured
G/F	Cedric Coward^{INJ6}	Memphis Grizzlies	Rookies
Honorary coach: Vince Carter
Head coach: Corliss Williamson

^INJ1 David Jones Garcia was unable to play due to a right ankle injury.
^INJ2 Ajay Mitchell was unable to play due to an abdominal strain.
^INJ3 Cooper Flagg was unable to play due to a left midfoot sprain.
^INJ4 Alex Sarr was unable to play due to a right hamstring sprain.
^INJ5 Mac McClung was unable to play due to a right calf injury.
^INJ6 Cedric Coward was unable to play due to a right knee soreness.
^REP1 Mac McClung was selected as David Jones Garcia's replacement.
^REP2 Zaccharie Risacher was selected as Ajay Mitchell's replacement.
^REP3 Ace Bailey was selected as Cooper Flagg's replacement.
^REP4 Bub Carrington was selected as Alex Sarr's replacement.
^REP5 Jahmir Young was selected as Mac McClung's replacement.
^REP6 Carter Bryant was selected as Cedric Coward's replacement.

Semifinals
February 13 – Inglewood, CA
Team Austin	34
Team Melo	40
February 13 – Inglewood, CA
Team Vince	41
Team T-Mac	36

Final
February 13 – Inglewood, CA
Team Melo	24
Team Vince	25

== Game records ==
Points	Rebounds	Assists
1. Kevin Durant, 46 (2009); 2. Kenneth Faried, 40 (2013); Russell Westbrook, 40 (2010); 4. Amar'e Stoudemire, 36 (2004); Tim Hardaway Jr., 36 (2014); Jamal Murray, 36 (2017); 7. Jaylen Brown, 35 (2018); Kyle Kuzma, 35 (2019); 9. Kyrie Irving, 34 (2012)	1. Andre Drummond, 25 (2014); 2. DeJuan Blair, 23 (2010); 3. Elton Brand, 21 (2000); 4. DeJuan Blair, 15 (2011); 5. Quentin Richardson, 14 (2001); Marcus Fizer, 14 (2002); Chris Bosh, 14 (2005); DeMarcus Cousins, 14 (2011)	1. John Wall, 22 (2011); 2. Chris Paul, 17 (2007); 3. De'Aaron Fox, 16 (2019); 4. Ben Simmons, 13 (2018); 5. Jordan Farmar, 12 (2008); 6. Khalid Reeves, 11 (1995); Damon Stoudamire, 11 (1996); Steve Francis, 11 (2000); Mike Miller, 11 (2002); Jamaal Tinsley, 11 (2003); Chris Paul, 11 (2006); Jamal Murray, 11 (2017)
Steals	Blocks	3-Pointers
1. Chris Paul, 9 (2007); 2. Eddie Jones, 6 (1995); 3. Kenyon Martin, 5 (2002); Jason Richardson, 5 (2003); Donovan Mitchell, 5 (2018, 2019); De'Aaron Fox, 5 (2019)	1. Steven Adams, 4 (2014); 2. Dwight Howard, 3 (2005); Brook Lopez, 3 (2009)	1. Daniel Gibson, 11 (2008); 2. Frank Kaminsky, 9 (2017); Jamal Murray, 9 (2017); 4. Kyrie Irving, 8 (2012)

== MVPs ==
^	Active NBA player
*	Inducted into the Naismith Memorial Basketball Hall of Fame
(L)	Player won the award while on the losing team

Year	MVP winner	Team played
1994	(United States) Penny Hardaway (L)	Orlando Magic
1995	(United States) Eddie Jones (L)	Los Angeles Lakers
1996	(United States) Damon Stoudamire	Toronto Raptors
1997	(United States) Allen Iverson*	Philadelphia 76ers
1998	(Lithuania) Žydrūnas Ilgauskas	Cleveland Cavaliers
2000	(United States) Elton Brand	Chicago Bulls
2001	(United States) Wally Szczerbiak	Minnesota Timberwolves
2002	(United States) Jason Richardson	Golden State Warriors
2003	(United States) Gilbert Arenas	Golden State Warriors (2)
2004	(United States) Amar'e Stoudemire*	Phoenix Suns
2005	(United States) Carmelo Anthony*	Denver Nuggets
2006	(United States) Andre Iguodala	Philadelphia 76ers (2)
2007	(United States) David Lee	New York Knicks
2008	(United States) Daniel Gibson	Cleveland Cavaliers (2)
2009	(United States) Kevin Durant^	Oklahoma City Thunder
2010	(United States) Tyreke Evans	Sacramento Kings
2010	(United States) DeJuan Blair	San Antonio Spurs
2011	(United States) John Wall	Washington Wizards
2012	(United States) Kyrie Irving^	Cleveland Cavaliers (3)
2013	(United States) Kenneth Faried	Denver Nuggets (2)
2014	(United States) Andre Drummond^	Detroit Pistons
2015	(Canada) Andrew Wiggins^	Minnesota Timberwolves (2)
2016	(United States) Zach LaVine^	Minnesota Timberwolves (3)
2017	(Canada) Jamal Murray^	Denver Nuggets (3)
2018	(Serbia) Bogdan Bogdanović^	Sacramento Kings (2)
2019	(United States) Kyle Kuzma^	Los Angeles Lakers (2)
2020	(United States) Miles Bridges^	Charlotte Hornets
2021	Game was not held due to the COVID-19 pandemic	
2022	(United States) Cade Cunningham^	Detroit Pistons (2)
2023	(United States) Jose Alvarado^	New Orleans Pelicans
2024	(Canada) Bennedict Mathurin^	Indiana Pacers
2025	(United States) Stephon Castle^	San Antonio Spurs (2)
2026	(The Bahamas) V. J. Edgecombe^	Philadelphia 76ers (3)

== Participant players by team ==
Rank	Number	Team
1	23	Cleveland Cavaliers
2	20	Los Angeles Clippers
3	18	Vancouver Grizzlies / Memphis Grizzlies
3	18	Golden State Warriors
5	17	Chicago Bulls
5	17	Seattle SuperSonics / Oklahoma City Thunder
5	16	Philadelphia 76ers
8	15	Houston Rockets
8	15	Minnesota Timberwolves
8	15	New Jersey Nets / Brooklyn Nets
8	15	Utah Jazz
12	14	Boston Celtics
12	14	Denver Nuggets
12	14	Detroit Pistons
15	13	Toronto Raptors
15	13	Sacramento Kings
15	13	Portland Trail Blazers
18	12	Charlotte Bobcats / Charlotte Hornets
18	12	Phoenix Suns
18	12	San Antonio Spurs
18	12	Washington Bullets / Washington Wizards
22	11	Miami Heat
22	11	New York Knicks
22	11	Orlando Magic
25	10	Los Angeles Lakers
25	10	Milwaukee Bucks
25	10	Dallas Mavericks
25	10	Indiana Pacers
29	7	New Orleans Hornets / New Orleans/Oklahoma City Hornets / New Orleans Pelicans
30	6	Atlanta Hawks

== See also ==
- List of NBA All-Star Game records
