= Alan Griffin =

Alan Griffin may refer to:

- Alan Griffin (basketball) (born 2000), American basketball player
- Alan Griffin (politician) (born 1960), Australian politician
