= Stepinac =

Stepinac is a Croatian surname.

Stepinac families are Croats and they are mostly from Jastrebarsko area. In the past century, relatively most of Croatian residents bearing this family name were born in Jastrebarsko area and in Zagreb. In Brezarić in Jastrebarsko area every fifth inhabitant had the family name Stepinac. About 170 people with family name Stepinac live in Croatia today, in 60 households. There were 140 of them in the middle of the past century, and their number increased by 20 percent.

Notable people include:

- Aloysius Stepinac (1898–1960), Croatian cardinal, Archbishop of Zagreb

== See also ==
- Archbishop Stepinac High School, an all-boys Roman Catholic high school in White Plains, New York
