= Aubrey Griffin =

American basketball player (born 2001)

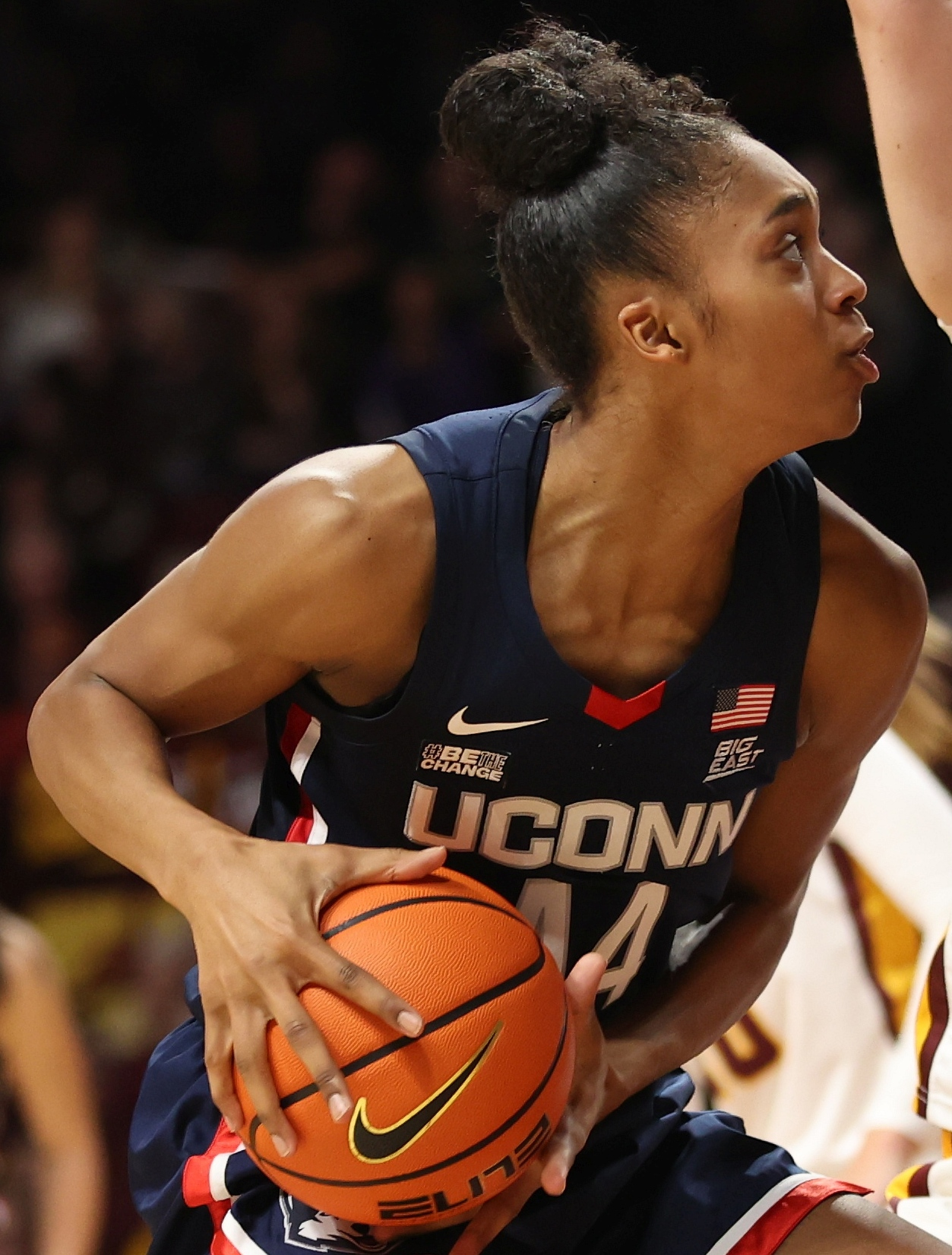
- Griffin in 2023

Personal information
- Born: November 6, 2001 (age 25) Ossining, New York, U.S.
- Listed height: 6 ft 1 in (1.85 m)
- Listed weight: 160 lb (73 kg)

Career information
- High school: Ossining (Ossining, New York)
- College: UConn (2019–2025)
- WNBA draft: 2025: 3rd round, 37th overall pick
- Drafted by: Minnesota Lynx
- Playing career: 2025–present
- Position: Forward

Career history
- 2025: Minnesota Lynx
- 2026: New York Liberty

Career highlights
- NCAA champion (2025); McDonald's All-American (2019); Miss New York Basketball (2019)
- Stats at Basketball Reference

Aubrey Griffin (born November 6, 2001) is an American professional basketball player who most recently played for the New York Liberty of the Women's National Basketball Association (WNBA). She played college basketball for the UConn Huskies. Griffin was selected 37th overall in the 2025 WNBA draft by the Minnesota Lynx.

== High school career ==
As a freshman, Griffin led Ossining to the 2016 Class AA NYSPHSAA championship. She tore her ACL before her sophomore year. In her junior year, she was named the 2018 New York Section 1 Player of the Year and an all-state selection. In her senior year, Griffin led the team to another appearance in the state championships, and was selected as Miss New York Basketball in 2019. She was also was a McDonald's All-American and a WBCA All-American.

Griffin was a five-star recruit and ranked no. 33rd in the class of 2019 by ESPN. She committed to UConn on September 27, 2018, and was the only commit from the class of 2019 for the team.

== College career ==
In her freshman season, Griffin came of the bench to average 6.4 points and 5.4 rebounds per game. On December 5, 2019 she recorded a double-double with 25 points and 12 rebounds at Seton Hall. She was named to the American Athletic Conference All-Tournament team. As a sophomore, Griffin appeared in 29 games. She made her first career start against Butler, scoring 17 points and 10 rebounds. In her junior year, Griffin did not play due to back pain, and later underwent a discectomy in January 2022.

As a redshirt junior, Griffin appeared in 35 games with 30 starts, averaging a career-best 11.3 points and 6.6 rebounds per game. On December 8, 2022 she set a career-high with 29 points and 10 rebounds against Princeton. Griffin went 11 for 11, tying Rebecca Lobo's single-game record for most consecutive made field goals in a game. She was an All-Big East honorable mention. In her redshirt senior season, Griffin scored a season-high 25 points against Louisville on December 16, 2023. She tore her left ACL in a game against Creighton on January 3, 2024 and would miss the rest of the season.

Griffin used an extra year of eligibility to compete for a sixth season, becoming the first player in program history to play for six seasons. She made her season debut in January 2025 and averaged 4.4 points and 3.3 rebounds per game.

== Professional career ==
=== Minnesota Lynx (2025) ===
Griffin was selected 37th overall by the Minnesota in the 2025 WNBA draft. The team announced that she would undergo arthroscopic surgery on her left knee.

=== New York Liberty (2026–present) ===
On May 8, 2026, Griffin was signed by the New York Liberty on a hardship contract.

== Personal life ==
Griffin is the daughter of Audrey Sterling and Adrian Griffin. Her father played in the NBA for ten years and served as head coach for the Milwaukee Bucks. Her mother was an All-American who ran track for Seton Hall. Griffin has a sister. Her two brothers, AJ and Alan, who were selected by the NBA. She graduated with a degree in women's studies in May 2023.

== Career statistics ==
Legend
GP	Games played	GS	Games started	MPG	Minutes per game	RPG	Rebounds per game
APG	Assists per game	SPG	Steals per game	BPG	Blocks per game	PPG	Points per game
TO	Turnovers per game	FG%	Field-goal percentage	3P%	3-point field-goal percentage	FT%	Free-throw percentage
**Bold**	Career best	°	League leader

*	Denotes seasons in which Griffin won an NCAA Championship

=== College ===
NCAA statistics
Year	Team	GP	GS	MPG	FG%	3P%	FT%	RPG	APG	SPG	BPG	TO	PPG
2019–20	UConn	32	0	16.7	51.4	10.0	60.2	5.4	1.0	**1.5**	0.6	1.1	6.4
2020–21	UConn	29	5	16.7	52.3	15.0	72.7	4.8	0.8	1.2	0.8	0.8	6.2
2021–22	UConn	Did not play due to injury											
2022–23	UConn	**35**	**30**	**30.5**	53.5	**29.1**	78.8	**6.6**	1.3	1.4	0.4	1.8	**11.3**
2023–24	UConn	14	5	21.9	54.7	27.3	76.6	6.0	**1.4**	**1.5**	**0.9**	0.9	9.5
2024–25*	UConn	16	1	11.1	**59.5**	0.0	**83.3**	3.4	0.9	0.5	0.4	**0.4**	4.4
**Career**		126	41	20.4	53.3	23.2	72.6	5.4	1.1	1.3	0.6	1.1	7.8
