= AJ Griffin (basketball) =

American basketball player (born 2003)

Personal information
- Born: August 25, 2003 (age 23) Dallas, Texas, U.S.
- Listed height: 6 ft 6 in (1.98 m)
- Listed weight: 220 lb (100 kg)

Career information
- High school: Archbishop Stepinac (White Plains, New York)
- College: Duke (2021–2022)
- NBA draft: 2022: 1st round, 16th overall pick
- Drafted by: Atlanta Hawks
- Playing career: 2022–2024
- Position: Small forward
- Number: 14

Career history
- 2022–2024: Atlanta Hawks
- 2024: →College Park Skyhawks

Career highlights
- ACC All-Freshman Team (2022); McDonald's All-American (2021)

Career NBA statistics
- Points: 687 (7.5 ppg)
- Rebounds: 171 (1.9 rpg)
- Assists: 78 (0.8 apg)
- Stats at NBA.com
- Stats at Basketball Reference
Medals
Men's basketball
Representing the United States
FIBA Americas U16 Championship
Gold medal – first place	2019 Brazil	Team

Adrian Darnell "AJ" Griffin Jr. (born August 25, 2003) is an American former professional basketball player who spent two seasons with the Atlanta Hawks of the National Basketball Association (NBA) before abruptly retiring, citing his faith in Jesus Christ. He was a first-round draft pick who played college basketball for the Duke Blue Devils.

== High school career ==
Griffin was a starter on the varsity basketball team for Ossining High School in Ossining, New York, as a seventh- and eighth-grader in 2015–16 alongside senior and future NBA player Obi Toppin. Griffin played basketball for Archbishop Stepinac High School in White Plains, New York. As a freshman, he played with his older brother, Alan, and helped his team win its first Catholic High School Athletic Association (CHSAA) Archdiocesan title since 1984. In his sophomore season, he and R. J. Davis formed one of the top backcourts in the nation. Griffin averaged 20.9 points, 10.9 rebounds, 3.9 assists, and 3.5 blocks per game. As a junior, he averaged 17.7 points, 8.8 rebounds, 2.4 assists and 2.3 blocks per game, missing most of the season with a knee injury, and led Stepinac to the CHSAA Archdiocesan title. Griffin was sidelined for his senior season by an ankle injury. He was named to the McDonald's All-American Game and Jordan Brand Classic rosters.

=== Recruiting ===
Griffin was rated a five-star recruit by 247Sports, Rivals and On3, and a four-star recruit by ESPN. On November 4, 2019, he committed to playing college basketball for Duke over offers from Kentucky and Villanova.

College recruiting
Name	Hometown	School	Height	Weight	Commit date
AJ Griffin; SF	Ossining, NY	Archbishop Stepinac (NY)	6 ft 6 in (1.98 m)	222 lb (101 kg)	Nov 4, 2019
AJ Griffin; SF	Recruit ratings: Rivals: 247Sports: On3: ESPN: (89)				
Overall recruit ranking: Rivals: 16 247Sports: 11 On3: 18 ESPN: 29
Note: In many cases, Scout, Rivals, 247Sports, On3, and ESPN may conflict in their listings of height and weight.; In these cases, the average was taken. ESPN grades are on a 100-point scale.; Sources: "Duke 2021 Basketball Commitments". Rivals.; "2021 Duke Blue Devils Recruiting Class". ESPN.; "2021 Team Ranking". Rivals.

== College career ==
On November 19, 2021, Griffin scored 18 points in an 88–55 win against Lafayette. He was named to the ACC All-Freshman Team as well as Honorable Mention All-ACC. At the conclusion of his freshman season, Griffin announced his intention to enter the 2022 NBA draft. Ahead of the draft, Griffin was projected as a potential top-five pick.

== Professional career ==
Griffin was selected with the 16th overall pick by the Atlanta Hawks in the 2022 NBA draft. He later joined the Hawks' 2022 NBA Summer League team. On July 3, 2022, the Hawks signed Griffin to a rookie-scale contract. On November 19, Griffin put up 17 points, alongside a game-winning alley-oop, five rebounds, an assist, a steal, and a block in a 124–122 win over the Toronto Raptors. On December 11, Griffin scored another game-winning alley-oop in a 123–122 win over the Chicago Bulls.

On June 27, 2024, the Hawks traded Griffin to the Houston Rockets for the draft rights of Nikola Đurišić in a three-team trade involving the Miami Heat. However, on September 20, the Rockets and he agreed to a contract buyout just as he was considering a retirement from basketball.

== Retirement ==
On September 29, 2024, Griffin confirmed his retirement and stated that he "gave up basketball to follow Jesus". Griffin noted that he wanted to pursue full-time Christian ministry.

== National team career ==
Griffin represented the United States at the 2019 FIBA Under-16 Americas Championship in Brazil. He averaged 13.5 points, 4.3 rebounds and 3.3 steals per game, helping his team win the gold medal. Griffin scored 18 points against Canada in the final.

== Career statistics ==
Legend
GP	Games played	GS	Games started	MPG	Minutes per game
FG%	Field goal percentage	3P%	3-point field goal percentage	FT%	Free throw percentage
RPG	Rebounds per game	APG	Assists per game	SPG	Steals per game
BPG	Blocks per game	PPG	Points per game	**Bold**	Career high

=== NBA ===
Year	Team	GP	GS	MPG	FG%	3P%	FT%	RPG	APG	SPG	BPG	PPG
2022–23	Atlanta	**72**	**12**	**19.5**	**.465**	**.390**	.894	**2.1**	**1.0**	**.6**	**.2**	**8.9**
2023–24	Atlanta	20	0	8.5	.290	.256	**1.000**	.9	.3	.1	.1	2.4
Career		92	12	17.1	.447	.372	.898	1.9	.8	.5	.2	7.5

=== College ===
Year	Team	GP	GS	MPG	FG%	3P%	FT%	RPG	APG	SPG	BPG	PPG
2021–22	Duke	39	25	24.0	.493	.447	.792	3.9	1.0	.5	.6	10.4

== Personal life ==
Griffin is a Christian and often takes to social media to speak about his faith. Griffin's father, Adrian, played in the NBA for ten seasons before becoming a coach in the league, and served as head coach for the Milwaukee Bucks. His mother, Audrey Sterling, was an All-American in track and ran for Seton Hall. His oldest sister is Vanessa. His other two siblings have played college basketball: his brother, Alan, at Illinois and Syracuse, and his sister, Aubrey, at UConn.
