= Adrian Griffin =

American basketball player and coach (born 1974)

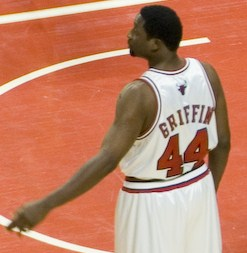
- Griffin in 2007

Personal information
- Born: July 4, 1974 (age 52) Wichita, Kansas, U.S.
- Listed height: 6 ft 5 in (1.96 m)
- Listed weight: 230 lb (104 kg)

Career information
- High school: Wichita East (Wichita, Kansas)
- College: Seton Hall (1992–1996)
- NBA draft: 1996: undrafted
- Playing career: 1996–2008
- Position: Small forward / shooting guard
- Number: 44, 7
- Coaching career: 2008–present

Career history

Playing
- 1996: Long Island Surf
- 1996–1999: Connecticut Pride
- 1998–1999: Atlantic City Seagulls
- 1998: Roseto
- 1999–2001: Boston Celtics
- 2001–2003: Dallas Mavericks
- 2003–2004: Houston Rockets
- 2004–2005: Chicago Bulls
- 2005–2006: Dallas Mavericks
- 2006–2008: Chicago Bulls
- 2008: Seattle SuperSonics

Coaching
- 2008–2010: Milwaukee Bucks (assistant)
- 2010–2015: Chicago Bulls (assistant)
- 2015–2016: Orlando Magic (assistant)
- 2016–2018: Oklahoma City Thunder (assistant)
- 2018–2023: Toronto Raptors (assistant)
- 2023–2024: Milwaukee Bucks

Career highlights
- As player: CBA champion (1999); CBA Finals MVP (1999); CBA Most Valuable Player (1999); 2× All-CBA First Team (1998, 1999); 2× CBA All-Defensive Team (1998, 1999); CBA All-Rookie First Team (1997); USBL Player of the Year (1999); 2× USBL Playoffs MVP (1998, 1999); Second-team All-Big East (1996); Third-team All-Big East (1995); Haggerty Award winner (1996); As assistant coach: NBA champion (2019)

Career NBA statistics
- Points: 1,919 (4.0 ppg)
- Rebounds: 1,512 (3.2 rpg)
- Assists: 653 (1.4 apg)
- Stats at NBA.com
- Stats at Basketball Reference
Medals
Men's basketball
Representing United States
FIBA Americas Championship
Gold medal – first place	1997 Montevideo	Team competition

Adrian Darnell Griffin Sr. (born July 4, 1974) is an American professional basketball coach and former player who most recently served as the head coach for the Milwaukee Bucks of the National Basketball Association (NBA). He played in the NBA as a shooting guard and small forward from 1999 to 2008. Griffin grew up in Wichita, Kansas, and played college basketball for the Seton Hall Pirates.

== College career ==
Griffin attended Seton Hall University and was a three-year starter. As a senior, he averaged 16.2 points, 8.3 rebounds and 3.1 assists per game, and won All-Big East second-team honors. In 2010, Griffin was inducted into the Seton Hall Athletics Hall of Fame.

== Professional career ==
Griffin was not selected in the 1996 NBA draft. He spent the first three years of his career in the American minor leagues and in Italy (playing 8 games for Cordivari Roseto from July to October 1998). Griffin was selected to the All-Rookie First Team in 1997 while playing for the Connecticut Pride of the Continental Basketball Association. He was selected to the All-CBA First Team and All-Defensive Team with the Pride in 1998. Griffin led the Pride to the CBA championship in the 1998–99 season as he was named the Finals Most Valuable Player. He was also selected as the CBA Most Valuable Player and earned All-CBA First Team and All-Defensive Team honors.

Griffin began his National Basketball Association (NBA) career in 1999–2000 with the Boston Celtics. As a rookie, his averages were 7 points, 5.2 rebounds and 1.61 steals per game.

Over six seasons, he played for the Boston Celtics, Dallas Mavericks, Houston Rockets and Chicago Bulls, averaging 4.4 points, 3.3 rebounds and one steal per game. A career highlight was becoming a starter for the Dallas Mavericks in the 2006 NBA Finals.

After one season with the Mavericks, Griffin signed a three-year deal with the Chicago Bulls on July 17, 2006.

On February 21, 2008, Griffin was traded to the Seattle SuperSonics in an 11-player deal that involved players from the Chicago Bulls, Cleveland Cavaliers and the SuperSonics.

On August 13, 2008, Griffin was traded to the Milwaukee Bucks in a three-team, six-player deal involving the Bucks, the Cleveland Cavaliers and the Oklahoma City Thunder that also sent Milwaukee's Mo Williams to Cleveland, Cleveland's Joe Smith and Milwaukee's Desmond Mason to Oklahoma City, and Cleveland's Damon Jones and Oklahoma City's Luke Ridnour to Milwaukee.

== Coaching career ==
=== Assistant coach (2008–2023) ===
Shortly after his playing career ended, he was hired by Milwaukee Bucks head coach Scott Skiles as an assistant, where he would work for the next two seasons.

On September 8, 2010, he became an assistant coach for the Chicago Bulls under Tom Thibodeau, where he coached for five years.

Along with working in the NBA, in 2014, Griffin accepted the offer to work with the USA coaching staff that helped win the gold medal in the 2014 FIBA World Cup. This team featured many NBA stars including: Stephen Curry, James Harden and Kyrie Irving.

On June 26, 2015, he was hired by the Orlando Magic to be their top assistant coach.

On July 1, 2016, Griffin was hired by the Oklahoma City Thunder as an assistant coach.

On July 25, 2018, Griffin was hired by the Toronto Raptors as an assistant coach. Griffin was an instrumental piece of the Raptors 2019 championship run, where they defeated the Golden State Warriors in six games of the 2019 NBA Finals, yielding Griffin his first championship ring. On April 10, 2022, Griffin served as the acting head coach for the Raptors' final game of the 2021–22 regular season against the Knicks.

=== Milwaukee Bucks (2023–2024) ===
On June 5, 2023, Griffin was named head coach of the Milwaukee Bucks. Griffin was fired on January 23, 2024. The team was 30–13 and in second place in the Eastern Conference at the time, though their wins had not been resounding. After his firing, the Bucks went 5–8 in their last 13 games before the 2024 NBA All-Star break began on February 16. With Milwaukee owning the second-best record in the Eastern Conference and the top-seeded Boston Celtics head coach Joe Mazzulla having coached in the 2023 NBA All-Star Game the year prior, the Bucks' coaching staff was named as the unit to coach in the 2024 game. However, due to Griffin's termination, newly appointed Bucks head coach Doc Rivers instead coached the Eastern Conference All-Stars in the contest. A few weeks prior to the game, Rivers said he would award his All-Star ring and bonus check to Griffin.

== Personal life ==
Griffin is a Christian. His father worked for Boeing in Wichita, Kansas, while also working as a pastor in a local church.

Griffin completed his bachelor's and master's degrees from Seton Hall. He earned his Ph.D. in Organizational Leadership at Concordia University Chicago in January 2022. His doctoral dissertation was titled "How Active NBA Assistant Coaches Experience Stress, Stressors, Coping Strategies, and Interventions in a Competitive Sports Environment."

Griffin married Audrey Sterling in 1996. Together, they had two sons and two daughters. Griffin and Audrey divorced in 2016. Griffin went on to marry a second time, to his current wife, Kathy in 2016.

Griffin's son Adrian Jr. was a McDonald's All-American and five-star recruit in the class of 2021 and was drafted 16th overall to the Atlanta Hawks in 2022. Griffin's other son, Alan, played his first two college seasons at Illinois before transferring to Syracuse his junior season. He last played for the Milwaukee Bucks on a summer league contract. His daughter, Aubrey, was also McDonald's All-American and five-star recruit in the class of 2019 and played at UConn. She was drafted in the third round of the 2025 WNBA draft by the Minnesota Lynx.

In August 2020, Griffin was publicly accused of domestic abuse by his former wife, Audrey Sterling. The Raptors did not take any action against Griffin or conduct any investigation in regards to the allegations. Griffin filed a defamation suit against Sterling in 2021, which was settled in 2022.

== NBA career statistics ==
Legend
GP	Games played	GS	Games started	MPG	Minutes per game
FG%	Field goal percentage	3P%	3-point field goal percentage	FT%	Free throw percentage
RPG	Rebounds per game	APG	Assists per game	SPG	Steals per game
BPG	Blocks per game	PPG	Points per game	**Bold**	Career high

=== Regular season ===
Year	Team	GP	GS	MPG	FG%	3P%	FT%	RPG	APG	SPG	BPG	PPG
1999–00	Boston	72	47	**26.8**	.424	.281	.753	**5.2**	**2.5**	**1.6**	**.2**	6.7
2000–01	Boston	44	0	8.6	.340	.346	.750	2.0	.6	.4	.1	2.1
2001–02	Dallas	58	34	23.8	**.499**	.296	.837	3.9	1.8	1.3	**.2**	**7.2**
2002–03	Dallas	**74**	**48**	18.6	.433	.250	.844	3.6	1.4	1.0	.1	4.4
2003–04	Houston	19	1	7.0	.278	**.500**	.000	1.0	.5	.4	.1	.6
2004–05	Chicago	69	1	9.7	.360	.222	.750	2.1	.8	.6	.1	2.2
2005–06	Dallas	52	45	23.9	.480	.000	.774	4.4	1.7	1.0	**.2**	4.6
2006–07	Chicago	54	1	10.8	.473	.000	.789	2.0	1.1	.6	.1	2.5
2007–08	Chicago	22	2	10.1	.400	.000	.429	1.7	1.0	.6	.1	2.3
2007–08	Seattle	13	0	6.5	.375	.000	**1.000**	1.7	.4	.4	.1	1.1
Career		477	179	16.8	.438	.278	.763	3.2	1.4	.9	.1	4.0

=== Playoffs ===
Year	Team	GP	GS	MPG	FG%	3P%	FT%	RPG	APG	SPG	BPG	PPG
2002	Dallas	4	1	14.3	**.588**	.000	.000	2.3	1.0	.5	**.2**	5.0
2003	Dallas	15	2	8.7	.415	**.333**	**1.000**	2.9	.5	.3	.0	2.5
2005	Chicago	5	0	17.2	.517	.000	.800	**4.0**	**1.8**	**1.0**	.0	**6.8**
2006	Dallas	**20**	**8**	**17.5**	.542	.000	.875	3.6	1.2	.8	.1	3.6
2007	Chicago	4	0	2.3	.000	.000	.000	.3	.0	.2	.0	.0
Career		48	11	13.2	.487	.200	.765	3.0	.9	.6	.1	3.4

== Head coaching record ==
=== NBA ===
Legend
Regular season	G	Games coached	W	Games won	L	Games lost	W–L %	Win–loss %
Playoffs	PG	Playoff games	PW	Playoff wins	PL	Playoff losses	PW–L %	Playoff win–loss %

Team	Year	G	W	L	W–L%	Finish	PG	PW	PL	PW–L%	Result
Milwaukee	2023–24	43	30	13	.698	(fired)	—	—	—	—	—
Career		43	30	13	.698		—	—	—	—	
