= Archbishop Stepinac High School =

Location
- 950 Mamaroneck Avenue; White Plains, (Westchester County), New York 10605; United States; 41°0′30″N 73°45′12″W

Information
- Type: Private, all-male
- Motto: Lumen Scientiae, Religio, Cor Amoris Patriae (Light of Knowledge, Religion, Love of Country)
- Religious affiliation: Roman Catholic
- Established: 1948 (78 years ago)
- CEEB code: 335940
- President: Fr. Thomas Collins
- Dean: Joseph Cupertino
- Principal: Paul Carty
- Athletic Director: Mike O’Donnell
- Chaplain: Fr. Timothy Wiggins
- Grades: 9–12
- Student to teacher ratio: 14.1
- Campus type: Suburban
- Colors: Red, white and blue
- Slogan: "Pride in Our Past, Faith in Our Future".
- Athletics conference: New York Catholic High School Athletic Association
- Sports: Baseball, basketball, bowling, football, golf, hockey, lacrosse, soccer, swimming, tennis, cross country / track & field, wrestling
- Mascot: Crusader
- Team name: Crusaders
- Rival: Iona Preparatory School
- Accreditation: Middle States Association of Colleges and Schools
- Publication: The Phoenix (literary journal)
- Newspaper: The Crusader
- Yearbook: The Shepherd
- Tuition: $16,950.00 (2024-2025)
- Affiliation: National Catholic Educational Association
- Website: stepinac.org

Archbishop Stepinac High School is an American all-boys' Roman Catholic high school in White Plains, New York.

It was operated by the Roman Catholic Archdiocese of New York until the 2009–2010 school year, when it became independent of the archdiocese.

It was founded in 1948 and named after Aloysius Stepinac, who was the Archbishop of Zagreb in Croatia (which was then part of Yugoslavia).

In 1952, Stepinac was appointed a cardinal by Pope Pius XII. Stepinac was beatified by Pope John Paul II in 1998.

== History ==
The school opened in 1948 with a capacity of 1,360 students. It began with freshman and sophomore years and reached its full complement in 1950.

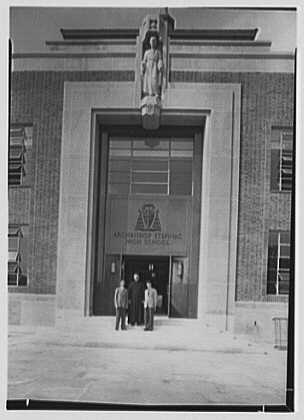
Archbishop Stephanic High School in 1948

The school was established after fundraising by the Catholic parishes of Westchester County, under the leadership of Francis Cardinal Spellman, the Archbishop of New York, and the archdiocese's educational officials.

The initial purpose of the school was to establish a full educational program with a diversity of subject choices, leading to a well-rounded student. In addition to the college preparatory program, it offered a general course for boys who wanted to finish their education with high school and enter a trade.

Boys were taught by an all-male faculty, almost entirely religious in makeup. In its earliest years, the administration of the school was mostly in the hands of priests of the Illinois-based Viatorian order, aided by some New York archdiocesan priests assisted by religious brothers and an occasional layman. All were under the supervision of the principal, Msgr. Joseph Krug.

Fr. John O'Keefe, the school's president from 1992 to 2004, was permanently removed from ministry in 2016 because of allegations of sexual abuse of a minor. O'Keefe's suspension was announced in a December 16, 2015, letter to parishioners from New York's archbishop, Cardinal Timothy Dolan, who called the allegation "credible".

== Demographics ==
=== Race ===
The high school is 8.5% Asian, 12.5% Black, 14% Hispanic, 60% White and 5% other.

== Program ==
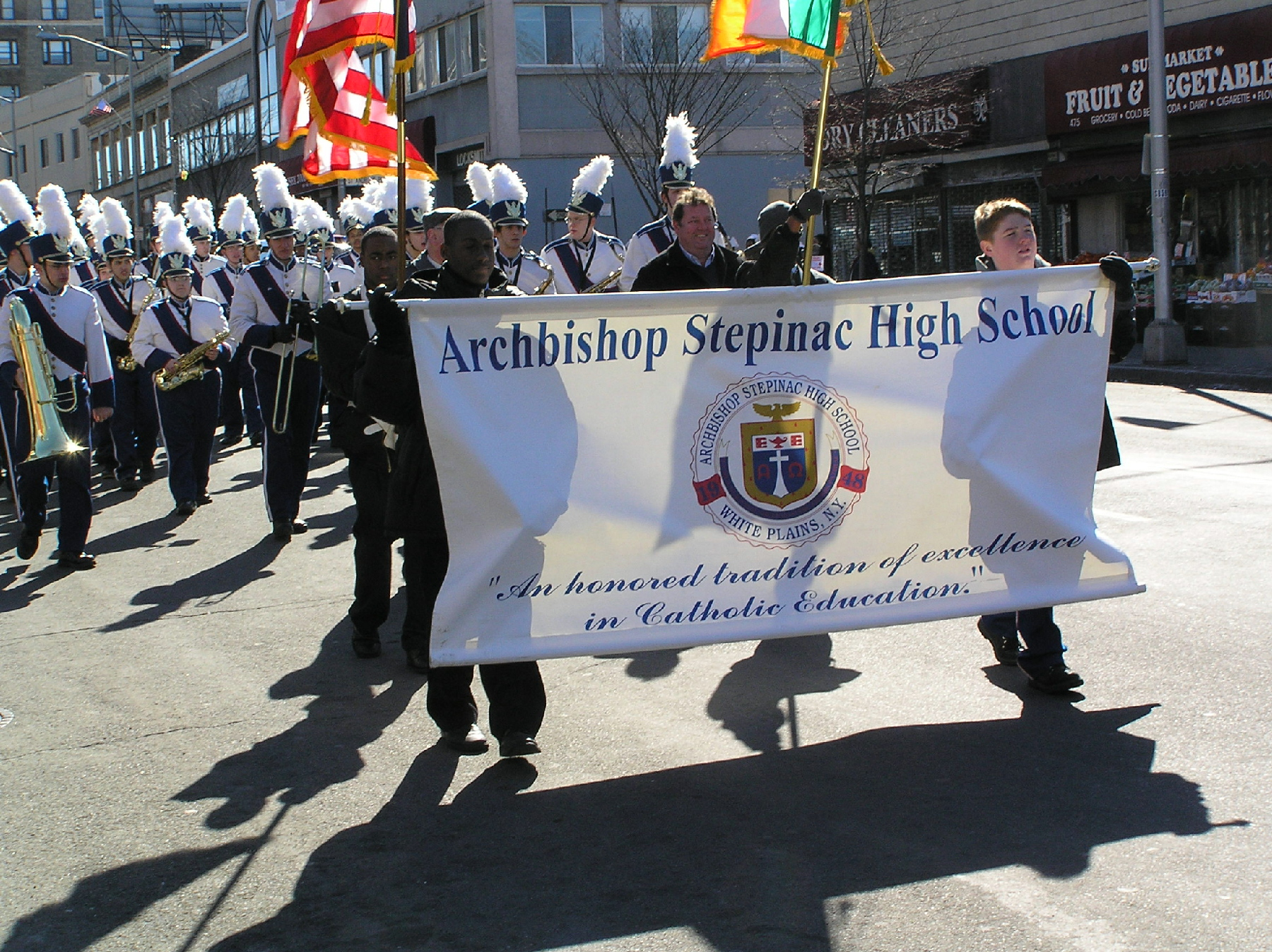
Archbishop Stepinac High School participates in the 2006 Saint Patrick's Day Parade in Yonkers, New York.

The school's administration and faculty is a mix of priests and lay men and women.

The school draws its students predominantly from Westchester County and has evolved into a college-preparatory school.

The school offers a college-preparatory program, an honors program offering 22 AP classes, and starting in the 2016–2017 school year, an honors academy designed to give students a head start in their respective field.

The school uses a library of digital textbooks that can be accessed by students on a variety of devices and is vastly less expensive than buying individual textbooks.

== Athletics ==
=== Football ===
- In 2017, Stepinac was voted as one of the top-15 most-dominant New York high school football programs since 2006.
- The Crusaders were the New York State Catholic Champions in 2015, 2017 and 2018.
- In 2017, the school finished ranked number five in the tri-state area, number one in New York State and number 160 in the nation by MaxPreps.

==== 2015 ====
On November 28, 2015, defeated Saint Francis High School of Buffalo 42–28 at Grand Island High School to win their first state championship. The victory marked the end of a 12-game undefeated season.

==== 2017 ====
- Stepinac won the 2017 Catholic High School Athletic Association (CHSAA) New York State Football Championship.

==== 2018 ====
- Stepinac won the 2018 Catholic High School Athletic Association (CHSAA) New York State Football Championship for the second consecutive year by defeating St. Francis of Buffalo.

=== Basketball ===
- Stepinac's basketball team won a state championship in 2018.
- Stepinac's basketball team won the New York Archdiocese Championship in 2020.

=== Lacrosse ===
- Won the CHSAA AA State Championship in 2024.

== Drama Club ==
The school's auditorium is named after Edward Bowes, the host of the Major Bowes Amateur Hour. The theatre hosts programs including the Annual Alumni Theatre, Annual Talent Show, the Fall Dramas, and the Spring Musicals.

== Notable alumni ==
Archbishop Stepinac High School alumni include:

- Lou Albano – former professional wrestler and manager
- Alan Alda – actor
- Billy Collins – poet; former U.S. Poet Laureate
- Marty Conlon – former NBA center
- Ajani Cornelius – college football player for the Oregon Ducks, formerly for the Rhode Island Rams
- Ted Daryll – songwriter
- R. J. Davis (class of 2020) – basketball player
- Owen Flanagan – James B. Duke Professor of Philosophy, Duke University
- Boogie Fland (class of 2024) – college basketball player for the Florida Gators
- Joe Garagiola Jr. – general manager, Arizona Diamondbacks
- AJ Griffin (class of 2021) – basketball player
- Alan Griffin – basketball player
- Gavin Heslop – NFL player
- Bob Hyland (class of 1963) – former NFL guard
- Malcolm Koonce – NFL player, Las Vegas Raiders
- Ray Montgomery – baseball player; executive coach, California Angels
- Eric Ogbogu – former NFL linebacker
- Erik Palladino – actor
- Joel Soriano – professional basketball player
- Nicholas Springer – Wheelchair Rugby player - Paralympic Champion & 2 time World Champion "did not graduate"
- Nicholas Tartaglione – Prisoner, cell mate of Jeffery Epstein
- Brian Sweeney (class of 1992) – baseball player; coach, Cleveland Indians
- Chip Taylor – songwriter
- Jordan Tucker (transferred) – basketball player
- Barry Voight – geologist
- Jon Voight – actor
- Chris Watson (born 1975) – basketball player
- Trill Williams – NFL player, Miami Dolphins
- Kevin Zraly – wine educator
