= 2020–21 Pac-12 Conference men's basketball season =

2020–21 Pac–12 men's basketball season
- League: NCAA Division I
- Sport: Basketball
- Teams: 12
- TV partner(s): ESPN, ESPN2, ESPNU, Fox Sports 1, FOX, Pac-12 Network, CBS

Regular season
- Regular season champions: Oregon
- Season MVP: Evan Mobley, USC
- Top scorer: Evan Mobley (USC)

Pac-12 tournament
- Champions: Oregon State Beavers
- Runners-up: Colorado
- Tournament MVP: Warith Alatishe (OSU)

Pac-12 men's basketball seasons
- ← 2019–20 2021–22 →

2020–21 Pac-12 Conference men's basketball standings
	Conf.				Overall
Team	W		L	PCT	W		L	PCT
Oregon	14	–	4	.778	21	–	7	.750
No. 23 USC	15	–	5	.750	25	–	8	.758
No. 22 Colorado	14	–	6	.700	23	–	9	.719
UCLA	13	–	6	.684	22	–	10	.688
Arizona*	11	–	9	.550	17	–	9	.654
Oregon State †	10	–	10	.500	20	–	13	.606
Stanford	10	–	10	.500	14	–	13	.519
Utah	8	–	11	.421	12	–	13	.480
Arizona State	7	–	10	.412	11	–	14	.440
Washington State	7	–	12	.368	14	–	13	.519
Washington	4	–	16	.200	5	–	21	.192
California	3	–	17	.150	9	–	20	.310
† Conference tournament winner *Ineligible for the conference and NCAA tournaments due to self-imposed postseason ban. Rankings from AP poll

The 2020–21 Pac-12 Conference men's basketball season began with practices in October 2020 followed by the 2020–21 NCAA Division I men's basketball season in November 2020. The conference schedule began in December 2020. This was the ninth season under the Pac-12 Conference name and the 61st since the conference was established under its current charter as the Athletic Association of Western Universities in 1959. Including the history of the Pacific Coast Conference, which operated from 1915 to 1959 and is considered by the Pac-12 as a part of its own history, this is the Pac-12's 105th season of basketball. The Pac-12 announced on December 4, 2019 they would expand conference play to a 20-game schedule, with the two addition games per school, one at home and the other on the road, being added during the months of November and December.

The Pac-12 tournament was scheduled for March 10–13, 2021 at the T-Mobile Arena in Paradise, Nevada.

== Pre-season ==
=== Recruiting classes ===
Rankings
Team	ESPN	Rivals	Scout/247 Sports	Signees
Arizona	-	No. 7	No. 5	7
Arizona State	No. 12	No. 12	No. 7	4
California	-	No. 84	No. 80	2
Colorado	-	No. 32	No. 41	4
Oregon	-	No. 82	No. 102	1
Oregon State	-	No. 70	No. 95	4
Stanford	-	No. 15	No. 11	5
UCLA	-	No. 85	No. 109	1
USC	-	No. 35	No. 56	2
Utah	-	No. 45	No. 45	4
Washington	-	-	-	
Washington State	-	-	No. 33	6

=== Preseason watch lists ===
Below is a table of notable preseason watch lists.

	Wooden	Naismith	Cousy	West	Erving	Malone	Abdul-Jabbar
Timmy Allen, Utah				✓			
Matt Bradley, Cal				✓			
Remy Martin, Arizona State	✓	✓	✓				
Evan Mobley, USC		✓					✓
Oscar da Silva, Stanford	✓	✓				✓	
Chris Smith, UCLA	✓	✓			✓		
Zaire Williams, Stanford	✓	✓			✓		
McKinley Wright IV, Colorado	✓	✓	✓				

=== Preseason All-American teams ===
	CBS	AP
Remy Martin, Arizona State	2nd	1st
Evan Mobley, USC	3rd	

=== Preseason polls ===
	AP	CBS Sports	Coaches	ESPN	KenPom	Lindy's; Sports
Arizona	–	–	–	–	No. 38	
Arizona State	No. 18	No. 24	No. 25	No. 17	No. 16	No. 36
California	–	–	–	–	–	No. 119
Colorado	–	–	–	–	–	No. 61
Oregon	No. 20	No. 12	No. 20	No. 20	No. 17	No. 21
Oregon State	–	–	–	–	–	No. 110
Stanford	No. 33	–	–	No. 38	–	No. 32
UCLA	No. 22	No. 16	No. 23	No. 21	No. 19	No. 28
USC	–	–	–	–	–	No. 48
Utah	–	–	–	–	–	No. 52
Washington	–	–	–	–	–	No. 75
Washington State	–	–	–	–	–	No. 136

=== Pac-12 media days ===
Men’s Basketball Media Preseason Poll
Place	Team	Points	First place votes
1.	UCLA	251	9
2.	Arizona State	246	5
3.	Oregon	241	7
4.	Stanford	209	1
5.	Arizona	173	--
6.	USC	154	1
7.	Colorado	149	--
8.	Utah	131	--
9.	Washington	85	--
10.	California	65	--
11.	Washington State	54	--
12.	Oregon State	36	--

=== Early-season tournaments ===
All usually scheduled non-conference basketball tournaments were cancelled due to COVID-19 pandemic.

Team	Tournament	Finish
Arizona	–	–
Arizona State	–	–
California	–	–
Colorado	–	–
Oregon	–	–
Oregon State	—	—
Stanford	–	–
UCLA	–	–
USC	–	–
Utah	–	–
Washington	–	–
Washington State	–	–

=== Pac-12 Preseason All-Conference ===
First Team

Name	School	Pos.	Yr.	Ht., Wt.	Hometown (last school)
Timmy Allen	Utah	SF	Jr.	6−6, 210	Mesa, Ariz. (Red Mountain HS)
Matt Bradley	California	PG	Jr.	6−4, 220	Mount Pleasant, Utah (Wasatch Academy)
Oscar da Silva	Stanford	PF	Sr.	6−9, 225	Munich, Germany (Ludwig Gymnasium)
Chris Duarte	Oregon	SG	Sr.	6−9, 190	Troy, New York (Redemption Christian)
Remy Martin	Arizona State	PG	Sr.	6−0, 170	Chatsworth, CA (Sierra Canyon High School)
Evan Mobley	USC	C	Fr.	7−0, 190	Temecula, Cali. (Rancho Christian School)
Will Richardson	Oregon	PG	Jr.	6−5, 190	Mouth of Wilson, Virg. (Oak Hill Academy)
Chris Smith	UCLA	SG	Sr.	6−9, 215	Chicago, IL (Huntington Prep)
Ziaire Williams	Stanford	SF	Fr.	6−8, 185	Sherman Oaks, Cali. (Sierra Canyon School)
McKinley Wright IV	Colorado	PG	Sr.	6−0, 195	North Robbinsdale, MN (Champlin Park)

Second Team

Name	School	Pos.	Yr.	Ht., Wt.	Hometown (last school)
Isaac Bonton	Washington State	PG	Jr.	6−2, 175	Portland, Ore. (Parkrose HS)
Tyger Campbell	UCLA	PG	RSo.	5−11, 180	Cedar Rapids, Iowa (La Lumiere School)
Josh Christopher	Arizona State	SG	Fr.	6−4, 200	Bellflower, Cali. (Mayfair High School)
Ethan Thompson	Oregon State	SG	Jr.	6−5, 195	Los Angeles, Cali. (Bishop Montgomery High School)
Alonzo Verge Jr.	Arizona State	SG	Sr.	6−2, 170	Chicago, Ill. (Willowbrook High School)

Honorable Mention

- James Akinjo (ARIZ, PG)
- Evan Battey (COLO, PF)
- Quade Green (WASH, PG)
- Jalen Hill (UCLA, PF)
- Jaime Jaquez Jr. (UCLA, SF)

=== Midseason watch lists ===
Below is a table of notable midseason watch lists.

	John R. Wooden Award	Naismith	Cousy	West	Erving	Malone	Abdul-Jabbar
Chris Duarte, Oregon				✓			
Remy Martin, ASU	✓						
Evan Mobley, USC	✓	✓					✓
Oscar da Silva, Stanford		✓				✓	
Ziaire Williams, Stanford					✓		
McKinley Wright IV, Colorado			✓				

=== Final watch lists ===
Below is a table of notable year-end watch lists.

	Naismith Defensive Player of the Year	West	Abdul-Jabbar
Chris Duarte, Oregon		✓	
Evan Mobley, USC	✓		✓

== Regular season ==
The schedule was released in late October. Before the season, it was announced that for the seventh consecutive season, all regular season conference games and conference tournament games would be broadcast nationally by CBS Sports, FOX Sports, ESPN Inc. family of networks including ESPN, ESPN2 and ESPNU, and the Pac-12 Network.

=== Records against other conferences ===
2020–21 records against non-conference foes as of (January 19, 2021):

Regular season

Power conferences	Record
ACC	0–1
Big East	2–2
Big Ten	0–2
Big 12	1–1
SEC	1–2
Power conference total	4–8
Other NCAA Division I conferences	Record
America East	0–0
American	0–0
A-10	1–0
ASUN	0–0
Big Sky	12–1
Big South	0–0
Big West	6–1
CAA	0–0
C-USA	2–1
Horizon	0–0
Ivy League	–
MAAC	0–0
MAC	0–0
MEAC	2–0
MVC	0–0
Mountain West	0–3
NEC	0–0
OVC	0–0
Patriot League	0–0
SoCon	0–0
Southland	3–0
SWAC	2–0
The Summit	2–0
Sun Belt	1–0
WAC	7–0
WCC	8–3
Other Division I total	45–9
Division II total	2–0
NCAA Division I total	51–17

=== Record against ranked non-conference opponents ===
This is a list of games against ranked opponents only (rankings from the AP poll):

Date	Visitor	Home	Site	Significance	Score	Conference record
Nov. 26, 2020	No. 11 Villanova	No. 18 Arizona State†	Mohegan Sun Arena • Uncasville, CT	2K Empire Classic	L 74–83	0–1
Nov. 29, 2020	No. 2 Baylor	Washington†	T-Mobile Arena • Paradise, Nevada		L 52–86	0–2
Dec. 1, 2020	No. 14 North Carolina	Stanford†	Harrah's Cherokee Center • Asheville, NC	Maui Invitational tournament	L 63–67	0–3
Dec. 8, 2020	Colorado	No. 12 Tennessee	Thompson-Boling Arena • Knoxville, TN		L 47–56	0–4
Dec. 10, 2020	No. 24 San Diego State	No. 23 Arizona State	Desert Financial Arena • Tempe, AZ		L 68–80	0–5
Dec. 19, 2020	No. 20 Ohio State	UCLA†	Rocket Mortgage FieldHouse • Cleveland, OH	CBS Sports Classic	L 70–77	0–6

Team rankings are reflective of AP poll when the game was played, not current or final ranking.

† denotes game was played on neutral site

=== Conference schedule ===
This table summarizes the head-to-head results between teams in conference play.

	Arizona	ASU	California	Colorado	Oregon	OSU	Stanford	UCLA	USC	Utah	Washington	WSU
vs. Arizona	–	0–2	0–1	1–1	2–0	0–2	2–0	2–0	1–1	1–0	0–1	0–2
vs. Arizona State	2–0	–	0–2	1–0	1–0	1–1	0–1	2–0	2–0	1–0	0–2	0–1
vs. California	1–0	2–0	–	1–1	2–0	2–0	2–0	2–0	1–0	1–1	1–1	2–0
vs. Colorado	1–1	0–1	1–1	–	1–1	0–2	0–2	1–1	0–2	1–1	1–0	0–2
vs. Oregon	0–2	0–1	0–2	1–1	–	1–1	0–2	0–1	1–0	0–2	0–2	1–0
vs. Oregon State	2–0	1–1	0–2	2–0	1–1	–	1–1	1–0	1–1	0–2	0–1	1–1
vs. Stanford	0–2	1–0	0–2	2–0	2–0	1–1	–	0–1	2–0	1–1	0–2	1–1
vs. UCLA	0–2	0–2	0–2	1–1	1–0	0–1	1–0	–	2–0	0–2	0–2	1–1
vs. USC	1–1	0–2	0–1	2–0	0–1	1–1	0–2	0–2	–	1–1	0–2	0–2
vs. Utah	0–1	0–1	1–1	1–1	2–0	2–0	1–1	2–0	1–1	–	1–1	0–1
vs. Washington	1–0	2–0	1–1	0–1	2–0	1–0	2–0	2–0	2–0	1–1	–	1–1
vs. Washington State	2–0	1–0	0–2	2–0	0–1	1–1	1–1	1–1	2–0	1–0	1–1	–
Total	11–9	7–10	3–17	14–6	14–4	10–10	10–10	14–6	14–5	8–11	4–16	7–12

=== Points scored ===
Team	For	Against	Difference
Arizona	1,961	1,783	178
Arizona State	1,995	2,077	-83
California	2,031	2,127	-96
Colorado	2,488	2,169	319
Oregon	2,184	1,981	203
Oregon State	2,427	2,318	109
Stanford	1,941	1,955	-14
UCLA	2,199	2,053	146
USC	2,401	2,101	300
Utah	1,986	1,931	55
Washington	1,854	2,110	-256
Washington State	1,912	1,885	27

Through March 22, 2021

=== Rankings ===
	Improvement in ranking
	Drop in ranking
RV	Received votes but were not ranked in Top 25
NV	No votes received

		Pre	Wk 2	Wk 3	Wk 4	Wk 5	Wk 6	Wk 7	Wk 8	Wk 9	Wk 10	Wk 11	Wk 12	Wk 13	Wk 14	Wk 15	Wk 16	Wk 17	Final
Arizona	AP	NV	NV	NV	RV	NV	NV	RV	NV	NV	RV	NV	NV	NV	NV	NV	NV	NV	–
Arizona	C	NV	NV	NV	NV	NV	NV	NV	NV	NV	NV	NV	NV	NV	NV	NV	NV	NV	NV
Arizona State	AP	18	25	23	RV	NV	NV	NV	NV	NV	NV	NV	NV	NV	NV	NV	NV	NV	–
Arizona State	C	17	17	23	RV	NV	NV	NV	NV	NV	NV	NV	NV	NV	NV	NV	NV	NV	NV
California	AP	NV	NV	NV	NV	NV	NV	NV	NV	NV	NV	NV	NV	NV	NV	NV	NV	NV	–
California	C	NV	NV	NV	NV	NV	NV	NV	NV	NV	NV	NV	NV	NV	NV	NV	NV	NV	NV
Colorado	AP	NV	RV	NV	NV	RV	RV	RV	RV	RV	RV	RV	RV	RV	RV	24	23	22	–
Colorado	C	NV	NV	NV	NV	RV	RV	RV	RV	23	RV	RV	RV	RV	NV	RV	RV	22	23
Oregon	AP	20	21	RV	RV	25	21 т	17	22	21	RV	RV	NV	RV	RV	RV	RV	RV	–
Oregon	C	20	20	RV	RV	24	17	15	17	21	25	RV	RV	25	23	25	25	25	17
Oregon State	AP	NV	NV	NV	NV	NV	NV	NV	NV	NV	NV	NV	NV	NV	NV	NV	NV	NV	–
Oregon State	C	NV	NV	NV	NV	NV	NV	NV	NV	NV	NV	NV	NV	NV	NV	NV	NV	NV	20
Stanford	AP	RV	RV	NV	NV	NV	NV	NV	NV	NV	NV	NV	NV	NV	NV	NV	NV	NV	–
Stanford	C	RV	RV	NV	NV	RV	RV	NV	RV	NV	NV	NV	NV	NV	NV	NV	NV	NV	NV
UCLA	AP	22	RV	RV	RV	RV	RV	RV	RV	24	23	21	RV	RV	RV	RV	NV	NV	–
UCLA	C	21	21	RV	RV	RV	RV	RV	21	20	21	21	24	RV	RV	RV	RV	RV	7
USC	AP	NV	NV	NV	NV	NV	NV	NV	RV	RV	NV	RV	20	17	19	RV	24	23T	–
USC	C	NV	NV	NV	NV	NV	NV	RV	RV	RV	RV	RV	20	18	18	24	23	23	9
Utah	AP	NV	NV	NV	NV	NV	NV	NV	NV	NV	NV	NV	NV	NV	NV	NV	NV	NV	–
Utah	C	NV	NV	NV	NV	NV	NV	NV	NV	NV	NV	NV	NV	NV	NV	NV	NV	NV	NV
Washington	AP	NV	NV	NV	NV	NV	NV	NV	NV	NV	NV	NV	NV	NV	NV	NV	NV	NV	–
Washington	C	NV	NV	NV	NV	NV	NV	NV	NV	NV	NV	NV	NV	NV	NV	NV	NV	NV	NV
Washington State	AP	NV	NV	RV	NV	NV	NV	NV	NV	NV	NV	NV	NV	NV	NV	NV	NV	NV	–
Washington State	C	NV	NV	NV	NV	NV	NV	NV	NV	NV	NV	NV	NV	NV	NV	NV	NV	NV	NV

== Head coaches ==
=== Coaching changes ===
There were no coaching changes during the 2020 off-season.

=== Coaches ===
Note: Stats shown are before the beginning of the season. Overall and Pac-12 records are from time at current school.

Team	Head coach	Previous job	Seasons at school	Overall record	Pac-12 record	Pac-12 titles	NCAA tournaments	NCAA Final Fours	NCAA championships
Arizona	Sean Miller	Xavier	12th	285–100 (.740)	138–59 (.701)	3	7	0	0
Arizona State	Bobby Hurley	Buffalo	5th	93–69 (.574)	43–47 (.478)	0	2	0	0
California	Mark Fox	Georgia	2nd	14–18 (.438)	7–11 (.389)	0	0	0	0
Colorado	Tad Boyle	Northern Colorado	11th	210–134 (.610)	92-86 (.517)	0	4	0	0
Oregon	Dana Altman	Creighton	11th	259–103 (.715)	118–62 (.656)	3	6	1	0
Oregon State	Wayne Tinkle	Montana	7th	93–96 (.492)	42–66 (.389)	0	1	0	0
Stanford	Jerod Haase	UAB	5th	69–61 (.531)	34–38 (.472)	0	0	0	0
UCLA	Mick Cronin	Cincinnati	2nd	19–12 (.613)	12–6 (.667)	0	0	0	0
USC	Andy Enfield	Florida Gulf Coast	8th	132–102 (.564)	55–71 (.437)	0	2	0	0
Utah	Larry Krystkowiak	New Jersey Nets (assistant)	10th	171–126 (.576)	83–79 (.512)	0	2	0	0
Washington	Mike Hopkins	Syracuse (assistant)	4th	63–39 (.618)	30–24 (.556)	0	1	0	0
Washington State	Kyle Smith	San Francisco	2nd	16–16 (.500)	6–12 (.333)	0	0	0	0

Notes:

- Overall and Pac-12 records, conference titles, etc. are from time at current school and are through the end the 2019–20 season.
- NCAA tournament appearances are from time at current school only.
- NCAA Final Fours and championship include time at other schools.

== Postseason ==
=== Pac-12 tournament ===
Oregon State won the conference tournament from March 10–13, 2021, at the T-Mobile Arena, Paradise, Nevada. The top four teams had a bye on the first day. Teams were seeded by conference record, with ties broken by record between the tied teams followed by record against the regular-season champion, if necessary. Arizona announced a self imposed post season ban for the 2020–21 NCAA season, which includes the Pac-12 tournament.

First round Wednesday, March 10
8	Arizona State	64
9	Washington State	59
7	Utah	98
10	Washington	95
6	Stanford	58
11	California	76

Quarterfinals; Thursday, March 11
1	Oregon	91
8	Arizona State	73
4	UCLA	79
5	Oregon State	83*
2	#24 USC	91**
7	Utah	85
3	#23 Colorado	61
11	California	58

Semifinals; Friday, March 12
1	Oregon	64
5	Oregon State	75
2	#24 USC	70
3	#23 Colorado	72

Championship; Saturday, March 13
5	Oregon State	70
3	#23 Colorado	68

* denotes overtime period

=== NCAA tournament ===
Five teams from the conference were selected to participate: Colorado, Oregon, Oregon State, UCLA and USC. While the highest seed was Colorado at No. 5, two teams—USC and Oregon State—advanced to the Elite Eight, and UCLA made it to the Final Four.

Seed	Region	School	First Four	First round	Second round	Sweet Sixteen	Elite Eight	Final Four	Championship
No. 12	Midwest Region	Oregon State	–	defeated No. 5 Tennessee 70–56	defeated No. 4 Oklahoma State 80–70	defeated No. 8 Loyola–Chicago 64–58	lost to No. 2 Houston 61–67	–	–
No. 6	West Region	USC	–	defeated No. 11 Drake 72–56	defeated No. 3 Kansas 85–51	defeated No. 7 Oregon 82–68	lost to No. 1 Gonzaga 66–85	–	–
No. 7	West Region	Oregon	–	no contest No. 10 VCU^	defeated No. 2 Iowa 95–80	lost to No. 6 USC 68–82	–	–	–
No. 5	East Region	Colorado	–	defeated No. 12 Georgetown 96–73	lost to No. 4 Florida State 71–53	–	–	–	–
No. 11	East Region	UCLA	defeated No. 11 Michigan State 86–80^{OT}	defeated No. 6 BYU 73–62	defeated No. 14 Abilene Christian 67–47	defeated No. 2 Alabama 88–78^{OT}	No. 1 Michigan 52–49	lost to No. 1 Gonzaga 90–93	–
	5 Bids	W-L (%):	1–0 (1.000)	4–0 (1.000)	4–1 (.800)	3–1 (.750)	1–2 (.333)	0–1 (.000)	TOTAL: 13–5 (.722)

^ VCU withdrew from the tournament due to positive COVID-19 test, resulting in Oregon advancing to the round of 32 via no contest.

=== National Invitation Tournament ===
No teams from the conference were selected to participate:

Seed	Bracket	School	First round	Second round	Quarterfinals	Semifinals	Finals
—	―	―	−	−	−	−	−
	Bid	W-L (%):	0–0 (–)	0–0 (–)	0–0 (–)	0–0 (–)	TOTAL: 0–0 (–)

Index to colors and formatting
Pac-12 member won
Pac-12 member lost

=== Postseason records against other conferences ===
2020-21 postseason records against non-conference foes as of (April 4, 2021):

Regular season

Power conferences	Record
ACC	0–1
Big East	1–0
Big Ten	3–0
Big 12	2–0
SEC	2–0
Power conference total	8–1
Other NCAA Division I conferences	Record
AAC	0–1
MVC	2–0
Southland	1–0
WCC	1–2
Other Division I total	4–3
NCAA Division I total	12–4^{^}

^ Totals do not include the Oregon no-contest due to VCU withdrawing due to COVID-19 or the result of the Oregon vs. USC Sweet 16 matchup.

== Awards and honors ==
=== Players of the Week ===
Throughout the conference regular season, the Pac-12 offices named one or two players of the week each Monday.

Week	Player of the Week	School	Freshman of the Week	School	Ref.
Nov. 30	McKinley Wright IV	Colorado	Joshua Christopher	Arizona State	
Dec. 7	Eugene Omoruyi	Oregon	Evan Mobley	USC	
Dec. 14	Jemarl Baker Jr.	Arizona	Evan Mobley (2)	USC	
Dec. 21	Oscar da Silva	Stanford	Ziaire Williams	Stanford	
Dec. 28	McKinley Wright IV (2)	Colorado	Efe Abogidi	Washington State	
Jan. 4	Chris Duarte	Oregon	Bennedict Mathurin	Arizona	
Jan. 11	Oscar da Silva (2)	Stanford	Evan Mobley (3)	USC	
Jan. 18	McKinley Wright IV (3)	Colorado	Jabari Walker	Colorado	
Jan. 25	Jamal Bey	Washington	Evan Mobley (4)	USC	
Feb. 1	Alfonso Plummer	Utah	Michael O'Connell	Stanford	
Feb. 8	Evan Mobley	USC	Evan Mobley (5)	USC	
Feb. 15	Johnny Juzang	UCLA	Evan Mobley (6)	USC	
Feb. 22	Noah Williams	Washington State	Azuolas Tubelis	Arizona	
Mar. 1	McKinley Wright IV (4)	Colorado	Azuolas Tubelis (2)	Arizona	
Mar. 8	Chris Duarte (2)	Oregon	Evan Mobley (7)	USC	

==== Totals per school ====
School	Total
USC	8
Colorado	5
Arizona	4
Stanford	4
Oregon	3
Washington State	2
Arizona State	1
UCLA	1
Utah	1
Washington	1

=== All-Americans ===
- Evan Mobley, USC, Second team (AP, Sporting News, USBWA)
- Chris Duarte, Oregon, Third team (AP, USBWA)

=== Hoophall awards ===
- Jerry West Award – Chris Duarte, Oregon

=== All-District ===
The United States Basketball Writers Association (USBWA) named the following from the Pac-12 to their All-District Teams:

District VIII

All-District Team

District IX

Player of the Year

All-District Team

The National Association of Basketball Coaches (NABC) named the following from the Pac-12 to their All-District Teams:

District 19

Player of the Year

Coach of the Year Andy Enfield, USC

All-District First Team

- Oscar da Silva, Stanford
- Evan Mobley, USC
- Chris Duarte, Oregon
- McKinley Wright IV, Colorado
- Tyger Campbell, UCLA

All-District Second Team

- Timmy Allen, Utah
- Remy Martin, Arizona St.
- Isaac Bonton, Washington St.
- James Akinjo, Arizona
- Eugene Omoruyi, Oregon

=== Conference awards ===
Voting was by conference coaches.

==== Individual awards ====
Pac-12 individual awards
Award	Recipient(s)
Player of The Year	Evan Mobley, Fr., USC
Coach of the Year	Andy Enfield, USC
Defensive Player of The Year	Evan Mobley, Fr., USC
Freshman of The Year	Evan Mobley, Fr., USC
Scholar-Athlete of the Year	Oscar da Silva, Sr., Stanford
Most Improved Player of The Year	Jaiden Delaire, Jr., Stanford
Sixth Man of The Year	Jordan Brown, R-So., Arizona

==== All-Pac-12 ====
First Team

Name	School	Pos.	Yr.	Ht., Wt.	Hometown (last school)
James Akinjo	Arizona	PG	Jr.	6−1, 185	Oakland, CA (Salesian College Preparatory)
Timmy Allen†	Utah	SF	Jr.	6−6, 210	Mesa, Ariz. (Red Mountain HS)
Tyger Campbell	UCLA	PG	R-So.	5−11, 180	Cedar Rapids, Iowa (La Lumiere School)
Oscar da Silva††	Stanford	PF	Sr.	6−9, 225	Munich, Germany (Ludwig Gymnasium)
Chris Duarte	Oregon	SG	Sr.	6−9, 190	Troy, New York (Redemption Christian)
Remy Martin††	Arizona State	PG	Sr.	6−0, 170	Chatsworth, CA (Sierra Canyon High School)
Evan Mobley‡	USC	PF	Fr.	7−0, 215	Murrieta, CA (Rancho Christian HS)
Eugene Omoruyi	Oregon	SF	R-Sr.	6−6, 235	Rexdale, Ontario (Orangeville Prep)
Ethan Thompson	Oregon State	SG	Jr.	6−5, 195	Los Angeles, Cali. (Bishop Montgomery High School)
McKinley Wright IV†††	Colorado	PG	Sr.	6−0, 195	North Robbinsdale, MN (Champlin Park)

- ‡ Pac-12 Player of the Year
- ††† three-time All-Pac-12 First Team honoree
- †† two-time All-Pac-12 First Team honoree
- † two-time All-Pac-12 honoree

Second Team

Name	School	Pos.	Yr.	Ht., Wt.	Hometown (last school)
Isaac Bonton	Washington State	PG	Jr.	6−2, 175	Portland, Ore. (Parkrose HS)
Matt Bradley	California	PG	Jr.	6−4, 220	Mount Pleasant, UT (Wasatch Academy)
Tahj Eaddy	USC	PG	R-Sr.	6−2, 165	West Haven, CT (The Skill Factory)
Jaime Jaquez Jr.	UCLA	SF	So.	6−4, 220	Camarillo, CA (Camarillo HS)
Johnny Juzang	UCLA	SG	So.	6−6, 210	Tarzana, CA (Harvard-Westlake School)

Honorable Mention

- Evan Battey, (COLO, PF)
- Jaiden Delaire, (STAN, SF)
- Quade Green, (WASH, PG)
- Ąžuolas Tubelis, (ARIZ, PF)
- Noah Williams, (WSU, SG)

==== All-Freshman Team ====
Name	School	Pos.	Ht., Wt.
Efe Abogidi	Washington State	C	6−10, 225
Bennedict Mathurin	Arizona	SG	6−7, 195
Evan Mobley†‡	USC	PF	7−0, 215
Ąžuolas Tubelis	Arizona	PF	6−11, 245
Jabari Walker	Colorado	SG	6−8, 200

† Pac-12 Player of the Year ‡ Pac-12 Freshman of the Year

Honorable Mention

- Marcus Bagley (ASU, SG)
- Josh Christopher (ASU, SF)
- Dishon Jackson (WSU, C)
- Ziaire Williams (STAN, SF)

==== All-Defensive Team ====
Name	School	Pos.	Yr.	Ht., Wt.
Oscar da Silva	Stanford	PF	Sr.	6−9, 225
Chris Duarte	Oregon	SG	Sr.	6−9, 190
Jaime Jaquez Jr.	UCLA	SG	So.	6−4, 220
Evan Mobley†‡	USC	PF	Fr.	7−0, 215
Eli Parquet	COLO	SG	Jr.	6−3, 194

- † Pac-12 Player of the Year
- ‡Pac-12 Defensive Player of the Year
- †† two-time Pac-12 All-Defensive Team honoree

Honorable Mention

- Warith Alatishe, (OSU, PF)
- Bryce Wills, (STAN, PG)
- McKinley Wright IV, (COLO, PG)

==== All-Academic team ====
The Pac-12 moved to seasonal Academic Honor Rolls, discontinuing sport-by-sport teams, starting in 2019–20.

Name	School	Pos.	Ht., Wt.	GPA	Major
Oscar da Silva‡	Stanford	PF	6−9, 230	3.43	Biology

- ‡ indicates player was Pac-12 Scholar-Athlete of the Year
- †† two-time Pac-12 All-Academic honoree
- ††† three-time Pac-12 All-Academic honoree

== 2021 NBA draft ==
Round	Pick	Player	Position	Nationality	Team	School/club team
1	3	Evan Mobley	PF	United States	Cleveland Cavaliers	USC (Fr.)
1	10	Ziaire Williams	SF	United States	New Orleans Pelicans	Stanford (Fr.)
1	13	Chris Duarte	SG	Dominican Republic	Indiana Pacers	Oregon (Sr.)
1	24	Josh Christopher	SG	United States	Houston Rockets	ASU (Fr.)

== Home game attendance ==
The Pac-12 announced October 29, 2020 that fans would not be allowed to attend any team home games until at least January 2021 due to the COVID-19 pandemic.

Team	Stadium	Capacity	Game 1	Game 2	Game 3	Game 4	Game 5	Game 6	Game 7	Game 8	Game 9	Game 10	Game 11	Game 12	Game 13	Game 14	Game 15	Game 16	Game 17	Game 18	Total	Average	% of Capacity
Arizona	McKale Center	14,644	–	–	–	–	–	–	–	–	–	–	–	–	–	–	–	–	–	–	–	–	–
Arizona State	Desert Financial Arena	14,100	–	–	–	–	–	–	–	–	–	–	–	–	–	–	–	–	–	–	–	–	–
California	Haas Pavilion	11,858	–	–	–	–	–	–	–	–	–	–	–	–	–	–	–	–	–	–	–	–	–
Colorado	Coors Events Center	11,064	–	–	–	–	–	–	–	–	–	–	–	–	–	–	–	–	–	–	–	–	–
Oregon	Matthew Knight Arena	12,364	–	–	–	–	–	–	–	–	–	–	–	–	–	–	–	–	–	–	–	–	–
Oregon State	Gill Coliseum	9,604	–	–	–	–	–	–	–	–	–	–	–	–	–	–	–	–	–	–	–	–	–
Stanford	Maples Pavilion	7,233	–	–	–	–	–	–	–	–	–	–	–	–	–	–	–	–	–	–	–	–	–
UCLA	Pauley Pavilion	13,800	–	–	–	–	–	–	–	–	–	–	–	–	–	–	–	–	–	–	–	–	–
USC	Galen Center	10,258	–	–	–	–	–	–	–	–	–	–	–	–	–	–	–	–	–	–	–	–	–
Utah	Jon M. Huntsman Center	15,000	–	–	–	–	–	–	–	–	–	–	–	–	–	–	–	–	–	–	–	–	–
Washington	Alaska Airlines Arena	10,000	–	–	–	–	–	–	–	–	–	–	–	–	–	–	–	–	–	–	–	–	–
Washington State	Beasley Coliseum	11,671	–	–	–	–	–	–	–	–	–	–	–	–	–	–	–	–	–	–	–	–	–
Total		11,800																			–	–	–

Bold – At or exceed capacity
†Season high
