= 2020–21 USC Trojans men's basketball team =

American college basketball season

2020–21 USC Trojans men's basketball

NCAA tournament, Elite Eight
- Conference: Pac-12 Conference

Ranking
- Coaches: No. 9
- AP: No. 23т
- Record: 25–8 (15–5 Pac-12)
- Head coach: Andy Enfield (8th season)
- Assistant coaches: Jason Hart (8th season); Chris Capko (5th season); Eric Mobley (3rd season)
- Home arena: Galen Center

2020–21 Pac-12 Conference men's basketball standings
| | Conf. | | | | Overall |
| Team | W | | L | PCT | W | | L | PCT |
|---|---|---|---|---|---|---|---|---|
| Oregon | 14 | – | 4 | .778 | 21 | – | 7 | .750 |
| No. 23 USC | 15 | – | 5 | .750 | 25 | – | 8 | .758 |
| No. 22 Colorado | 14 | – | 6 | .700 | 23 | – | 9 | .719 |
| UCLA | 13 | – | 6 | .684 | 22 | – | 10 | .688 |
| Arizona* | 11 | – | 9 | .550 | 17 | – | 9 | .654 |
| Oregon State † | 10 | – | 10 | .500 | 20 | – | 13 | .606 |
| Stanford | 10 | – | 10 | .500 | 14 | – | 13 | .519 |
| Utah | 8 | – | 11 | .421 | 12 | – | 13 | .480 |
| Arizona State | 7 | – | 10 | .412 | 11 | – | 14 | .440 |
| Washington State | 7 | – | 12 | .368 | 14 | – | 13 | .519 |
| Washington | 4 | – | 16 | .200 | 5 | – | 21 | .192 |
| California | 3 | – | 17 | .150 | 9 | – | 20 | .310 |
† Conference tournament winner *Ineligible for the conference and NCAA tournaments due to self-imposed postseason ban. Rankings from AP poll

The 2020–21 USC Trojans men's basketball team represented the University of Southern California during the 2020–21 NCAA Division I men's basketball season. Led by eighth-year head coach Andy Enfield, they played their home games at the Galen Center in Los Angeles, California as members of the Pac-12 Conference. They finished the season 25–8, 15–5 in Pac-12 Play to finish in 2nd place. They defeated Utah in the quarterfinals of the Pac-12 tournament before losing in the semifinals to Colorado. They received an at-large bid to the NCAA tournament where they defeated Drake, Kansas, and Oregon to advance to the Elite Eight where they lost to Gonzaga.

== Previous season ==
The 2019–20 USC Trojans ended the season at 22–9 overall, and a 11–7 Conference record for a tie for 3rd Place with Arizona State. They were set to take on Arizona in the quarterfinals of the Pac-12 tournament. However, the remainder of the Pac-12 Tournament, and all other postseason tournaments, were cancelled amid the COVID-19 pandemic.

== Off-season ==
=== Departures ===
| Name | Number | Pos. | Height | Weight | Year | Hometown | Reason for Departure |
|---|---|---|---|---|---|---|---|
| Kyle Sturdivant | 1 | G | 6'3" | 200 | Freshman | Norcross, GA | Transferred to Georgia Tech |
| Jonah Mathews | 2 | G | 6'3" | 205 | Senior | Santa Monica, CA | Graduated |
| Elijah Weaver | 3 | G | 6'6" | 210 | Sophomore | Cocoa, FL | Transferred to Dayton |
| Daniel Utomi | 4 | G | 6'6" | 225 | GS Senior | Houston, TX | Graduated/signed to play professional in Finland with Kauhajoki Karhu |
| Quinton Adlesh | 10 | G | 6'1" | 200 | GS Senior | Arroyo Grande, CA | Graduated |
| Charles O'Bannon Jr. | 13 | G | 6'6" | 210 | RS Sophomore | Compton, CA | Mid-season transferred to TCU |
| Onyeka Okongwu | 21 | F | 6'9" | 245 | Freshman | Chino Hills, CA | Declared for the 2020 NBA draft; selected 6th overall by the Atlanta Hawks |
| Nick Rakocevic | 31 | F | 6'11" | 225 | Senior | Chicago, IL | Graduated |

=== Incoming transfers ===
| Name | Num | Pos. | Height | Weight | Year | Hometown | Previous School |
|---|---|---|---|---|---|---|---|
| Chevez Goodwin | 1 | F | 6'9" | 225 | Redshirt Senior | Columbia, SC | Transferred from Wofford. Will be eligible to play immediately since Goodwin graduated from Wofford. |
| Tahj Eaddy | 2 | G | 6'2" | 165 | Redshirt Senior | West Haven, CT | Transferred from Santa Clara. Will be eligible to play immediately since Eaddy graduated from Santa Clara. |
| Isaiah White | 5 | G | 6'7" | 210 | Redshirt Senior | Rancho Cucamoga, CA | Transferred from Utah Valley. Will be eligible to play immediately since White graduated from Utah Valley. |
| Drew Peterson | 13 | G | 6'8" | 195 | Junior | Libertyville, IL | Transferred from Rice. Peterson was granted a waiver for immediate eligibility. Will have two years of remaining eligibility. |
| Joshua Morgan | 24 | F | 6'11" | 210 | Sophomore | Sacramento, CA | Transferred from Long Beach State. Under NCAA transfer rules, Morgan will have to sit out the 2020–21 season. Will have three years of remaining eligibility. |
| Reggie Parris | 32 | G | 6'3" | 190 | Junior | Denver, CO | Transferred from San Diego. Will join the team as a walk-on. |
| Amar Ross | 55 | G | 5'7" | 150 | Junior | Long Beach, CA | Transferred from Bethesda. Will join the team as a walk-on. |

=== 2020 recruiting class ===
College recruiting information
| Name | Hometown | School | Height | Weight | Commit date |
|---|---|---|---|---|---|
| Evan Mobley; C / PF | Murrieta, CA | Rancho Christian School (CA) | 7 ft 0 in (2.13 m) | 210 lb (95 kg) | Aug 15, 2019 |
| Evan Mobley; C / PF | Recruit ratings: Rivals: 247Sports: ESPN: (97) | | | | |
| Reese Dixon-Waters; SG | Long Beach, CA | St. Bernard (CA) | 6 ft 5 in (1.96 m) | 210 lb (95 kg) | Mar 24, 2020 |
| Reese Dixon-Waters; SG | Recruit ratings: Rivals: 247Sports: ESPN: (81) | | | | |
| Boubacar Coulibaly; C | Bamako, Mali | San Gabriel Academy (CA) | 6 ft 10 in (2.08 m) | 210 lb (95 kg) | Mar 13, 2020 |
| Boubacar Coulibaly; C | Recruit ratings: Rivals: 247Sports: ESPN: (79) | | | | |
Overall recruit ranking:
Note: In many cases, Scout, Rivals, 247Sports, On3, and ESPN may conflict in their listings of height and weight.; In these cases, the average was taken. ESPN grades are on a 100-point scale.; Sources: "USC 2020 Basketball Commitments". Rivals.; "2020 USC Trojans Recruiting Class". ESPN.; "2020 Team Ranking". Rivals.

=== 2021 Recruiting class ===
College recruiting information (2021)
| Name | Hometown | School | Height | Weight | Commit date |
|---|---|---|---|---|---|
| Harrison Hornery; PF | Toowoomba, Australia | Mater Dei (CA) | 6 ft 9 in (2.06 m) | 210 lb (95 kg) | Oct 31, 2019 |
| Harrison Hornery; PF | Recruit ratings: Rivals: 247Sports: ESPN: (80) | | | | |
| Malik Thomas; SG | Fontana, CA | Damien (CA) | 6 ft 3 in (1.91 m) | 185 lb (84 kg) | Mar 27, 2020 |
| Malik Thomas; SG | Recruit ratings: Rivals: 247Sports: ESPN: (82) | | | | |
| Kobe Johnson; SG | Milwaukee, WI | Nicolet (WI) | 6 ft 5 in (1.96 m) | 185 lb (84 kg) | Sep 3, 2020 |
| Kobe Johnson; SG | Recruit ratings: Rivals: 247Sports: ESPN: (79) | | | | |
Overall recruit ranking:
Note: In many cases, Scout, Rivals, 247Sports, On3, and ESPN may conflict in their listings of height and weight.; In these cases, the average was taken. ESPN grades are on a 100-point scale.; Sources: "USC 2021 Basketball Commitments". Rivals.; "2021 USC Trojans Recruiting Class". ESPN.; "2021 Team Ranking". Rivals.

== Roster ==
2020–21 USC Trojans men's basketball team
Players
Coaches

| Pos. | # | Name | Height | Weight | Year | Previous school | Hometown |
|---|---|---|---|---|---|---|---|
| G | 0 | Talin Lewis (W) | 6 ft 4 in (1.93 m) | 180 lb (82 kg) | Jr | Oaks Christian | Westlake Village, CA |
| F | 1 | Chevez Goodwin | 6 ft 9 in (2.06 m) | 225 lb (102 kg) | RS Sr | Wofford | Columbia, SC |
| G | 2 | Tahj Eaddy | 6 ft 2 in (1.88 m) | 165 lb (75 kg) | RS Sr | Santa Clara | West Haven, CT |
| F | 3 | Isaiah Mobley | 6 ft 10 in (2.08 m) | 235 lb (107 kg) | So | Rancho Christian School | Murrieta, CA |
| F | 4 | Evan Mobley | 7 ft 0 in (2.13 m) | 215 lb (98 kg) | Fr | Rancho Christian School | Murrieta, CA |
| G | 5 | Isaiah White | 6 ft 7 in (2.01 m) | 210 lb (95 kg) | RS Sr | Utah Valley | Rancho Cucamonga, CA |
| F | 12 | Boubacar Coulibaly | 6 ft 10 in (2.08 m) | 210 lb (95 kg) | Fr | San Gabriel Academy | Bamako, Mali |
| G | 13 | Drew Peterson | 6 ft 8 in (2.03 m) | 195 lb (88 kg) | Jr | Rice | Libertyville, IL |
| G | 14 | McKay Anderson (W) | 6 ft 5 in (1.96 m) | 190 lb (86 kg) | RS Sr | Pasadena City College | La Cañada, CA |
| G | 20 | Ethan Anderson | 6 ft 1 in (1.85 m) | 215 lb (98 kg) | So | Fairfax HS | Los Angeles, CA |
| G | 21 | Reese Dixon-Waters | 6 ft 5 in (1.96 m) | 210 lb (95 kg) | Fr | St. Bernard HS | Long Beach, CA |
| F | 23 | Max Agbonkpolo | 6 ft 9 in (2.06 m) | 190 lb (86 kg) | So | Santa Margarita HS | Laguna Niguel, CA |
| F | 24 | Joshua Morgan | 6 ft 11 in (2.11 m) | 210 lb (95 kg) | So | Long Beach State | Sacramento, CA |
| G | 30 | Noah Baumann | 6 ft 6 in (1.98 m) | 215 lb (98 kg) | RS Jr | San Jose State | Phoenix, AZ |
| G | 32 | Reggie Parris (W) | 6 ft 3 in (1.91 m) | 190 lb (86 kg) | Jr | San Diego | Denver, CO |
| G | 55 | Amar Ross (W) | 5 ft 7 in (1.7 m) | 150 lb (68 kg) | Jr | Bethesda | Long Beach, CA |

Head coach

- Andy Enfield (Johns Hopkins)

Assistant coach(es)

- Jason Hart (Syracuse)
- Chris Capko (South Florida)
- Eric Mobley (Portland)

Legend

- (C) Team captain
- (S) Suspended
- (I) Ineligible
- (W) Walk-on
- Injured
- Current redshirt

Roster

=== Team Recognition ===
- Andy Enfield
  - John R. Wooden Pac-12 Coach of the Year
  - Naismith Trophy Men's Coach of the Year Late Season Watch List
- Evan Mobley
  - Pac-12 Player of the Year
  - Pac-12 Freshman of the Year
  - Pac-12 Defensive Player of the Year
  - All-Pac-12 First Team
  - Pac-12 All-Freshman Team
  - Pac-12 All-Defensive Team
  - Pac-12 Freshman of the Week (Week 2, Week 3, Week 7, Week 9, Week 11, Week 13)
  - Pac-12 Men's Basketball Preseason Media First Team All-Conference
  - Wooden Award Preseason Top 50 Watch List
  - Wooden Award Midseason Top 25 Watch List
  - Wooden Award Late Season Top 20 Watch List
  - NABC Player Of The Year Watch List
  - Naismith Trophy Watch List
  - Naismith Defensive Play of the Year Award Watch List
  - Naismith Player of the Week (Week 13)
  - Naismith National Player of the Year Semifinalist
  - Kareem Abdul-Jabbar Award Watch List
  - Kareem Abdul-Jabbar Award Top 10 Finalist
  - NCAA Player of the Week
  - Pac-12 Player of the Week (Week 11) - 2nd player in the conference, after Onyeka Okongwu, to ever be recognized as player of the week and freshman of the week during the same week.
- Tahj Eaddy
  - All-Pac-12 Second Team

=== Injuries ===
- E. Anderson wasn't available for the UConn game due to back spasms. He remained on the sidelines until his return on January 14, 2021 against Washington.

== Schedule and results ==
| Date time, TV | Rank^{#} | Opponent^{#} | Result | Record | High points | High rebounds | High assists | Site (attendance) city, state |
Regular season
| November 25, 2020*; 6:00 pm, P12N | | California Baptist | W 95–87 ^{OT} | 1–0 | 21 – E. Mobley | 10 – I. Mobley | 4 – 2 Tied | Galen Center (0); Los Angeles, CA |
| November 28, 2020*; 6:00 pm, P12N | | Montana | W 76–62 | 2–0 | 13 – Peterson | 13 – I. Mobley | 5 – E. Anderson | Galen Center (0); Los Angeles, CA |
| December 1, 2020*; 11:30 am, ESPN2 | | vs. BYU; Legends Classic | W 79–53 | 3–0 | 19 – Peterson | 11 – 2 Tied | 4 – Eaddy | Mohegan Sun Arena (0); Uncasville, CT |
| December 3, 2020*; 4:00 pm, ESPN | | vs. UConn; Legends Classic | L 58–61 | 3–1 | 17 – E. Mobley | 7 – E. Mobley | 3 – E. Mobley | Mohegan Sun Arena (0); Uncasville, CT |
| December 8, 2020*; 7:00 pm, P12N | | UC Irvine | W 91–56 | 4–1 | 22 – E. Mobley | 10 – E. Mobley | 4 – Agbonkpolo | Galen Center (0); Los Angeles, CA |
| December 16, 2020*; 6:00 pm, P12N | | San Francisco | Canceled | | | | | Galen Center; Los Angeles, CA |
| December 23, 2020*; 2:00 pm, P12N | | Texas Southern | Canceled | | | | | Galen Center; Los Angeles, CA |
| December 29, 2020*; 4:00 pm, P12N | | Santa Clara (Note: The Loyola Marymount-USC Trojans game had originally been scheduled for December 29, but was canceled due to COVID-19 related issues within the Loyola Marymount program. This game was added after USC past four games have either postponed or canceled as a result of positive COVID-19 test results within the USC program.) | W 86–63 | 5–1 | 17 – E. Mobley | 7 – 2 Tied | 9 – Peterson | Galen Center (0); Los Angeles, CA |
| December 31, 2020; 7:00 pm, ESPN | | Colorado | L 62–72 | 5–2 (0–1) | 16 – Eaddy | 7 – E. Mobley | 5 – Eaddy | Galen Center (0); Los Angeles, CA |
| January 2, 2021; 1:00 pm, P12N | | Utah | W 64–46 | 6–2 (1–1) | 18 – Eaddy | 11 – Petersen | 5 – Eaddy | Galen Center (0); Los Angeles, CA |
| January 7, 2021; 6:00 pm, ESPN2 | | at Arizona | W 87–73 | 7–2 (2–1) | 22 – White | 11 – E. Mobley | 10 – Peterson | McKale Center (0); Tucson, AZ |
| January 9, 2021; 4:00 pm, P12N | | at Arizona State | W 73–64 | 8–2 (3–1) | 19 – E. Mobley | 13 – E. Mobley | 4 – Eaddy | Desert Financial Arena (0); Tempe, AZ |
| January 12, 2021*; 6:00 pm, P12N | | UC Riverside | W 67–62 ^{OT} | 9–2 (3–1) | 20 – E. Mobley | 12 – I. Mobley | 3 – Peterson | Galen Center (0); Los Angeles, CA |
| January 14, 2021; 6:30 pm, P12N | | Washington | W 95–68 | 10–2 (4–1) | 18 – I. Mobley | 7 – Peterson | 4 – I. Mobley | Galen Center (0); Los Angeles, CA |
| January 16, 2021; 6:30 pm, P12N | | Washington State | W 85–77 | 11–2 (5–1) | 21 – Eaddy | 11 – Peterson | 4 – 2 Tied | Galen Center (0); Los Angeles, CA |
| January 19, 2021; 4:00 pm, ESPN2 | | at Oregon State; Originally Scheduled for 12/20/20 (Note: The USC Trojans-Oregon State game had originally been scheduled for December 20, but was postponed as a result of positive COVID-19 test results within the USC program.) | L 56–58 | 11–3 (5–2) | 12 – E. Mobley | 13 – E. Mobley | 4 – Anderson | Gill Coliseum (0); Corvallis, OR |
| January 23, 2021; 5:00 pm, P12N | | at California | W 76–68 | 12–3 (6–2) | 25 – E. Mobley | 10 – I. Mobley | 3 – 2 Tied | Haas Pavilion (0); Berkeley, CA |
| January 28, 2021; 2:00 pm, ESPNU | | Oregon State | W 75–62 | 13–3 (7–2) | 14 – E. Mobley | 13 – E. Mobley | 4 – Eaddy | Galen Center (0); Los Angeles, CA |
| February 2, 2021; 6:00 pm, FS1 | | at Stanford; Originally Scheduled for 12/13/20 (Note: The Stanford-USC Trojans game had originally been scheduled for December 13, but was postponed as a result of positive COVID-19 test results within the USC program.) | W 72–66 | 14–3 (8–2) | 23 – E. Mobley | 11 – E. Mobley | 3 – Peterson | Maples Pavilion (0); Stanford, CA |
| February 6, 2021; 7:00 pm, ESPN | | No. 21 UCLA; Rivalry | W 66–48 | 15–3 (9–2) | 19 – Anderson | 11 – I. Mobley | 3 – E. Mobley | Galen Center (0); Los Angeles, CA |
| February 11, 2021; 7:00 pm, P12N | No. 20 | at Washington | W 69–54 | 16–3 (10–2) | 17 – E. Mobley | 12 – I. Mobley | 4 – 2 Tied | Alaska Airlines Arena (0); Seattle, WA |
| February 13, 2021; 5:00 pm, ESPNU | No. 20 | at Washington State | W 76–65 | 17–3 (11–2) | 29 – Eaddy | 11 – E. Mobley | 5 – Anderson | Beasley Coliseum (0); Pullman, WA |
| February 17, 2021; 5:00 pm, ESPN2 | No. 17 | Arizona State | W 89–71 | 18–3 (12–2) | 22 – E. Mobley | 12 – I. Mobley | 7 – E. Mobley | Galen Center (0); Los Angeles, CA |
| February 20, 2021; 3:00 pm, FOX | No. 17 | Arizona | L 72–81 | 18–4 (12–3) | 23 – E. Mobley | 7 – I. Mobley | 7 – Anderson | Galen Center (0); Los Angeles, CA |
| February 22, 2021; 6:00 pm, FS1 | No. 19 | Oregon; Originally Scheduled for 1/30/21 | W 72–58 | 19–4 (13–3) | 24 – T. Eaddy | 11 – D. Peterson | 8 – E. Anderson | Galen Center (0); Los Angeles, CA |
| February 25, 2021; 6:00 pm, ESPN2 | No. 19 | at Colorado | L 62–80 | 19–5 (13–4) | 13 – 2 Tied | 5 – 4 Tied | 2 – 3 Tied | CU Events Center (98); Boulder, CO |
| February 27, 2021; 5:00 pm, ESPN2 | No. 19 | at Utah | L 61–71 | 19–6 (13–5) | 19 – Peterson | 10 – I. Mobley | 2 – 3 Tied | Jon M. Huntsman Center (0); Salt Lake City, UT |
| March 3, 2021; 7:30 pm, FS1 | | Stanford; Originally Scheduled for 1/21/21 | W 79–42 | 20–6 (14–5) | 16 – Eaddy | 9 – Peterson | 6 – Peterson | Galen Center (0); Los Angeles, CA |
| March 6, 2021; 1:00 pm, CBS | | at UCLA; Rivalry | W 64–63 | 21–6 (15–5) | 13 – E. Mobley | 11 – E. Mobley | 4 – Anderson | Pauley Pavilion (0); Los Angeles, CA |
Pac-12 Tournament
| March 11, 2021; 5:30 pm, P12N | (2) No. 24 | vs. (7) Utah; Quarterfinals | W 91–85 ^{2OT} | 22–6 | 26 – E. Mobley | 9 – E. Mobley | 3 – Peterson | T-Mobile Arena (0); Paradise, NV |
| March 12, 2021; 8:30 pm, ESPN | (2) No. 24 | vs. (3) No. 23 Colorado; Semifinals | L 70–72 | 22–7 | 26 – E. Mobley | 9 – E. Mobley | 5 – Eaddy | T-Mobile Arena (0); Paradise, NV |
NCAA tournament
| March 20, 2021; 1:30 pm, TNT | (6 W) No. 23 | vs. (11 W) Drake; First Round | W 72–56 | 23–7 | 17 – E. Mobley | 11 – E. Mobley | 10 – Eaddy | Bankers Life Fieldhouse (2,163); Indianapolis, IN |
| March 22, 2021; 6:40 pm, CBS | (6 W) No. 23 | vs. (3 W) No. 12 Kansas; Second Round | W 85–51 | 24–7 | 17 – I. Mobley | 13 – E. Mobley | 5 – E. Mobley | Hinkle Fieldhouse (1,927); Indianapolis, IN |
| March 28, 2021; 6:45 pm, TBS | (6 W) No. 23 | vs. (7 W) Oregon; Sweet Sixteen | W 82–68 | 25–7 | 22 – White | 8 – E. Mobley | 6 – E. Mobley | Bankers Life Fieldhouse (3,460); Indianapolis, IN |
| March 30, 2021; 4:15 pm, TBS | (6 W) No. 23 | vs. (1 W) No. 1 Gonzaga; Elite Eight | L 66–85 | 25–8 | 19 – I. Mobley | 7 – I. Mobley | 3 – I. Mobley | Lucas Oil Stadium (6,166); Indianapolis, IN |
*Non-conference game. ^{#}Rankings from AP Poll. (#) Tournament seedings in parentheses. All times are in Pacific Time.

== Rankings ==
Ranking movements Legend: ██ Increase in ranking ██ Decrease in ranking — = Not ranked RV = Received votes т = Tied with team above or below
| | Week | | | | | | | | | | | | | | | | | |
| Poll | Pre | 1 | 2 | 3 | 4 | 5 | 6 | 7 | 8 | 9 | 10 | 11 | 12 | 13 | 14 | 15 | 16 | Final |
|---|---|---|---|---|---|---|---|---|---|---|---|---|---|---|---|---|---|---|
| AP Poll | — | — | — | — | — | — | — | RV | RV | RV | RV | 20 | 17 | 19 | RV | 24 | 23т | Not released |
| Coaches Poll | — | —^ | — | — | — | — | RV | RV | RV | RV | RV | 20 | 18 | 18 | 24 | 23 | 23 | 9 |

Note: AP does not release post-tournament rankings
^ Coaches did not release a Week 1 poll.
