= 2020–21 Colorado Buffaloes men's basketball team =

American college basketball season

2020–21 Colorado Buffaloes men's basketball

NCAA tournament, Second Round
- Conference: Pac-12 Conference

Ranking
- Coaches: No. 23
- AP: No. 22
- Record: 23–9 (14–6 Pac-12)
- Head coach: Tad Boyle (11th season)
- Assistant coaches: Mike Rhon; Bill Grier; Rick Ray
- Home arena: CU Events Center

2020–21 Pac-12 Conference men's basketball standings
| | Conf. | | | | Overall |
| Team | W | | L | PCT | W | | L | PCT |
|---|---|---|---|---|---|---|---|---|
| Oregon | 14 | – | 4 | .778 | 21 | – | 7 | .750 |
| No. 23 USC | 15 | – | 5 | .750 | 25 | – | 8 | .758 |
| No. 22 Colorado | 14 | – | 6 | .700 | 23 | – | 9 | .719 |
| UCLA | 13 | – | 6 | .684 | 22 | – | 10 | .688 |
| Arizona* | 11 | – | 9 | .550 | 17 | – | 9 | .654 |
| Oregon State † | 10 | – | 10 | .500 | 20 | – | 13 | .606 |
| Stanford | 10 | – | 10 | .500 | 14 | – | 13 | .519 |
| Utah | 8 | – | 11 | .421 | 12 | – | 13 | .480 |
| Arizona State | 7 | – | 10 | .412 | 11 | – | 14 | .440 |
| Washington State | 7 | – | 12 | .368 | 14 | – | 13 | .519 |
| Washington | 4 | – | 16 | .200 | 5 | – | 21 | .192 |
| California | 3 | – | 17 | .150 | 9 | – | 20 | .310 |
† Conference tournament winner *Ineligible for the conference and NCAA tournaments due to self-imposed postseason ban. Rankings from AP poll

The 2020–21 Colorado Buffaloes men's basketball team represented the University of Colorado in the 2020–21 NCAA Division I men's basketball season. They were led by head coach Tad Boyle in his eleventh season at Colorado. The Buffaloes played their home games at CU Events Center in Boulder, Colorado as members of the Pac-12 Conference. They finished the season 23–9, 14–6 in Pac-12 Play to finish in third place. They defeated California and USC to advance to the championship game of the Pac-12 tournament where they lost to Oregon State. They received an at-large bid to the NCAA tournament where they defeated Georgetown in the first round before losing in the second round to Florida State.

== Previous season ==
The Buffaloes finished the 2019–20 season 21–11, 10–8 in Pac-12 play to finish in a tie for fifth place. They lost in the first round of the Pac-12 tournament to Washington State.

== Off-season ==
=== Departures ===
| Name | Num | Pos. | Height | Weight | Year | Hometown | Reason for departure |
|---|---|---|---|---|---|---|---|
| Shane Gatling | 0 | G | 6'2" | 182 | Senior | Baldwin, NY | Graduated |
| Tyler Bey | 1 | G/F | 6'7" | 216 | Junior | Las Vegas, NV | Declare for 2020 NBA draft |
| Daylen Kountz | 2 | G | 6'4" | 191 | Sophomore | Denver, CO | Transferred to Northern Colorado |
| A. J. Martinka | 12 | G | 6'5" | 210 | Junior | Stanwood, WA | Walk-on; didn't return |
| Jakub Dombek | 15 | F | 6'11" | 210 | RS Freshman | Ostrava, Czech Republic | Transferred to Hartford |
| Lucas Siewert | 23 | F | 6'10" | 232 | RS Senior | San Antonio, TX | Graduated |
| Frank Ryder | 30 | F | 6'10" | 232 | Junior | Boulder, CO | Transferred to Denver |

=== Incoming transfers ===
| Name | Num | Pos. | Height | Weight | Year | Hometown | Previous school |
|---|---|---|---|---|---|---|---|
| Jeriah Horne | 41 | F | 6'7" | 222 | RS Senior | Overland Park, KS | Transferred from Tulsa. Will be eligible to play immediately since Horne graduated from Tulsa. |

=== 2020 recruiting class ===
College recruiting
| Name | Hometown | School | Height | Weight | Commit date |
|---|---|---|---|---|---|
| Dominique Clifford; SG | Colorado Springs, CO | The Vanguard School | 6 ft 4 in (1.93 m) | N/A | Sep 20, 2019 |
| Dominique Clifford; SG | Recruit ratings: Scout: Rivals: 247Sports: ESPN: | | | | |
| Luke O'Brien; SG | Littleton, CO | Columbine High School | 6 ft 6 in (1.98 m) | 185 lb (84 kg) | Nov 10, 2018 |
| Luke O'Brien; SG | Recruit ratings: Scout: Rivals: 247Sports: ESPN: | | | | |
| Jabari Walker; PF | Chandler, AZ | Compass Prep | 6 ft 8 in (2.03 m) | 195 lb (88 kg) | Apr 15, 2020 |
| Jabari Walker; PF | Recruit ratings: Scout: Rivals: 247Sports: ESPN: | | | | |
| Tristan da Silva; SF | Munich, Germany | Eberhard-Ludwigs-Gymnasium | 6 ft 8 in (2.03 m) | 200 lb (91 kg) | Apr 15, 2020 |
| Tristan da Silva; SF | Recruit ratings: Scout: Rivals: 247Sports: ESPN: | | | | |
Overall recruit ranking:
Note: In many cases, Scout, Rivals, 247Sports, On3, and ESPN may conflict in their listings of height and weight.; In these cases, the average was taken. ESPN grades are on a 100-point scale.; Sources: "2020 Colorado Commits". Rivals.; "2020 Team Ranking". Rivals.

=== 2021 Recruiting class ===
College recruiting (2021)
| Name | Hometown | School | Height | Weight | Commit date |
|---|---|---|---|---|---|
| Quincy Allen #11 SF | Washington, DC | Maret School | 6 ft 6 in (1.98 m) | 185 lb (84 kg) | Jul 17, 2020 |
| Quincy Allen #11 SF | Recruit ratings: Scout: Rivals: 247Sports: ESPN: | | | | |
| Lawson Lovering #19 C | Laramie, WY | Central High School | 7 ft 0 in (2.13 m) | 200 lb (91 kg) | Oct 28, 2019 |
| Lawson Lovering #19 C | Recruit ratings: Scout: Rivals: 247Sports: ESPN: | | | | |
| Javon Ruffin #57 SG | New Orleans, LA | PHH Prep | 6 ft 5 in (1.96 m) | 170 lb (77 kg) | Sep 19, 2020 |
| Javon Ruffin #57 SG | Recruit ratings: Scout: Rivals: 247Sports: ESPN: | | | | |
| Julian Hammond III #54 PG | Denver, CO | Cherry Creek High School | 6 ft 2 in (1.88 m) | 180 lb (82 kg) | Sep 13, 2020 |
| Julian Hammond III #54 PG | Recruit ratings: Scout: Rivals: 247Sports: ESPN: | | | | |
Overall recruit ranking:
Note: In many cases, Scout, Rivals, 247Sports, On3, and ESPN may conflict in their listings of height and weight.; In these cases, the average was taken. ESPN grades are on a 100-point scale.; Sources: "2021 Colorado Commits". Rivals.; "2021 Team Ranking". Rivals.

== Roster ==
2020–21 Colorado Buffaloes men's basketball team
Players
Coaches

| Pos. | # | Name | Height | Weight | Year | Previous school | Hometown |
|---|---|---|---|---|---|---|---|
| G | 0 | Luke O'Brien | 6 ft 7 in (2.01 m) | 200 lb (91 kg) | Fr | Columbine HS | Littleton, CO |
| G/F | 3 | Maddox Daniels | 6 ft 6 in (1.98 m) | 211 lb (96 kg) | Sr | Beverly Hills HS; Florida SouthWestern State | Suwanee, GA |
| G/F | 5 | D'Shawn Schwartz | 6 ft 7 in (2.01 m) | 232 lb (105 kg) | Sr | Sand Creek HS | Colorado Springs, CO |
| F | 10 | Alexander Strating | 6 ft 7 in (2.01 m) | 228 lb (103 kg) | RS Sr | American School of The Hague | Wassenaar, Netherlands |
| G | 11 | Keeshawn Barthelemy | 6 ft 2 in (1.88 m) | 163 lb (74 kg) | RS Fr | Thornlea Secondary School | Montreal, QC |
| F | 12 | Jabari Walker | 6 ft 8 in (2.03 m) | 200 lb (91 kg) | Fr | AZ Compass Prep | Inglewood, CA |
| F/C | 13 | Dallas Walton | 7 ft 0 in (2.13 m) | 235 lb (107 kg) | RS Sr | Arvada West HS | Arvada, CO |
| G | 15 | Owen Koonce (W) | 6 ft 5 in (1.96 m) | 180 lb (82 kg) | Fr | Cemtaurus HS | Lafayette, CO |
| F | 21 | Evan Battey | 6 ft 8 in (2.03 m) | 262 lb (119 kg) | RS Jr | Villa Park HS | Los Angeles, CA |
| F | 23 | Tristan da Silva | 6 ft 8 in (2.03 m) | 200 lb (91 kg) | Fr | Ludwigsgymnasium Munich | Munich, Germany |
| G | 24 | Elijah Parquet | 6 ft 3 in (1.91 m) | 195 lb (88 kg) | Jr | West Brook HS | Beaumont, TX |
| G | 25 | McKinley Wright IV (C) | 6 ft 0 in (1.83 m) | 196 lb (89 kg) | Sr | Champlin Park HS | North Robbinsdale, MN |
| F | 30 | Will Loughlin (W) | 6 ft 10 in (2.08 m) | 250 lb (113 kg) | So | Seattle Prep | Seattle, WA |
| G | 32 | Nique Clifford | 6 ft 5 in (1.96 m) | 175 lb (79 kg) | Fr | The Vanguard School | Colorado Springs, CO |
| G | 33 | Aidan McQuade (W) | 6 ft 2 in (1.88 m) | 195 lb (88 kg) | Sr | Loveland HS | Loveland, CO |
| G | 34 | Benan Ersek (W) | 6 ft 2 in (1.88 m) | 185 lb (84 kg) | Jr | Kent Denver School | Vienna, Austria |
| G | 40 | Isaac Jessup (W) | 6 ft 2 in (1.88 m) | 175 lb (79 kg) | Fr | Resurrection Catholic | Loveland, CO |
| F | 41 | Jeriah Horne | 6 ft 7 in (2.01 m) | 220 lb (100 kg) | RS Sr | The Barstow School; Tulsa | Overland Park, KS |

Head coach

- Tad Boyle (Kansas)

Assistant coach(es)

- Mike Rohn (McPherson)
- Bill Grier (Oregon)
- Rick Ray (Grand View College)

Legend

- (C) Team captain
- (S) Suspended
- (I) Ineligible
- (W) Walk-on
- Injured
- Current redshirt

Roster

== Schedule and results ==
| Date time, TV | Rank^{#} | Opponent^{#} | Result | Record | High points | High rebounds | High assists | Site (attendance) city, state |
Regular season
| November 25, 2020*; 6:00 pm, ESPN+ | | vs. South Dakota; Little Apple Classic | W 84–61 | 1–0 | 20 – Wright IV | 7 – 2 Tied | 5 – Wright IV | Bramlage Coliseum (0); Manhattan, KS |
| November 27, 2020*; 6:30 pm, ESPNU | | at Kansas State; Little Apple Classic | W 76–58 | 2–0 | 24 – Wright IV | 6 – Horne | 5 – Wright IV | Bramlage Coliseum (0); Manhattan, KS |
| December 8, 2020*; 4:00 pm, SECN+ | | at No. 12 Tennessee | L 47–56 | 2–1 | 15 – Horne | 11 – Horne | 4 – Wright IV | Thompson–Boling Arena (4,191); Knoxville, TN |
| December 8, 2020*; 6:00 pm, P12N | | Colorado School of Mines | Canceled | | | | | CU Events Center; Boulder, CO |
| December 8, 2020*; 6:00 pm, P12N | | Colorado State | Canceled | | | | | CU Events Center; Boulder, CO |
| December 14, 2020*; 7:00 pm, P12N | | Northern Colorado | W 81–45 | 3–1 | 19 – Wright IV | 8 – Battey | 7 – Wright IV | CU Events Center (26); Boulder, CO |
| December 16, 2020*; 3:00 pm, P12N | | Omaha | W 91–49 | 4–1 | 17 – Wright IV | 8 – Battey | 8 – Wright IV | CU Events Center (0); Boulder, CO |
| December 20, 2020*; 8:00 pm, P12N | | vs. Washington; Far West Classic | W 92–69 | 5–1 | 22 – Walton | 7 – Daniels | 5 – Wright IV | T-Mobile Arena (0); Paradise, NV |
| December 22, 2020*; 9:00 pm, P12N | | vs. Grand Canyon; Far West Classic | W 74–64 | 6–1 | 21 – Wright IV | 5 – Horne | 7 – Wright IV | T-Mobile Arena (0); Paradise, NV |
| December 28, 2020; 7:30 pm, P12N | | at Arizona | L 74–88 | 6–2 (0–1) | 18 – Battey | 8 – Horne | 4 – Wright IV | McKale Center (0); Tucson, AZ |
| December 31, 2020; 8:00 pm, ESPN | | at USC | W 72–62 | 7–2 (1–1) | 19 – Wright IV | 10 – Schwartz | 4 – Wright IV | Galen Center (0); Los Angeles, CA |
| January 2, 2021; 6:00 pm, P12N | | at UCLA | L 62–65 | 7–3 (1–2) | 12 – 2 Tied | 6 – Battey | 3 – Wright IV | Pauley Pavilion (0); Los Angeles, CA |
| January 7, 2021; 9:00 pm, FS1 | | No. 17 Oregon | W 79–72 | 8–3 (2–2) | 21 – Wright IV | 10 – 2 Tied | 5 – 2 Tied | CU Events Center (0); Boulder, CO |
| January 11, 2021; 4:00 pm, P12N | | at Utah | W 65–58 | 9–3 (3–2) | 15 – 2 Tied | 15 – Schwartz | 4 – Wright IV | Jon M. Huntsman Center (0); Salt Lake City, UT |
| January 14, 2021; 12:00 pm, P12N | | California | W 89–60 | 10–3 (4–2) | 23 – Walker | 11 – Walker | 12 – Wright IV | CU Events Center (0); Boulder, CO |
| January 16, 2021; 1:00 pm, P12N | | Stanford | W 77–64 | 11–3 (5–2) | 14 – Wright IV | 12 – Battey | 8 – Wright IV | CU Events Center (0); Boulder, CO |
| January 20, 2021; 6:00 pm, ESPN2 | | at Washington | L 80–84 | 11–4 (5–3) | 24 – Horne | 6 – 2 Tied | 6 – Wright IV | Alaska Airlines Arena (0); Seattle, WA |
| January 23, 2021; 5:00 pm, ESPN2 | | at Washington State | W 70–59 | 12–4 (6–3) | 16 – Battey | 7 – Wright IV | 5 – Wright IV | Beasley Coliseum (0); Pullman, WA |
| January 27, 2021; 7:00 pm, ESPNU | | Washington State | W 70–58 | 13–4 (7–3) | 16 – Wright IV | 5 – 2 Tied | 7 – Wright IV | CU Events Center (0); Boulder, CO |
| January 30, 2021; 12:30 pm, P12N | | Utah | L 74–77 | 13–5 (7–4) | 15 – Wright IV | 5 – 3 Tied | 6 – Barthelemy | CU Events Center (0); Boulder, CO |
| February 6, 2021; 6:00 pm, FS1 | | Arizona | W 82–79 | 14–5 (8–4) | 21 – Battey | 3 – 2 Tied | 6 – Wright IV | CU Events Center (74); Boulder, CO |
| February 8, 2021; 5:00 pm, P12N | | Oregon State | W 78–49 | 15–5 (9–4) | 16 – Horne | 7 – Walton | 4 – Wright IV | CU Events Center (61); Boulder, CO |
| February 11, 2021; 5:00 pm, ESPN2 | | at Stanford | W 69–51 | 16–5 (10–4) | 14 – Wright IV | 9 – Wright IV | 9 – Wright IV | Maples Pavilion (0); Stanford, CA |
| February 13, 2021; 8:00 pm, ESPNU | | at California | L 62–71 | 16–6 (10–5) | 13 – Wright IV | 12 – Horne | 3 – Wright IV | Haas Pavilion (0); Berkeley, CA |
| February 18, 2021; 9:00 pm, ESPN2 | | at Oregon | L 56–60 | 16–7 (10–6) | 16 – Schwartz | 11 – Schwartz | 2 – 2 Tied | Matthew Knight Arena (0); Eugene, OR |
| February 20, 2021; 6:00 pm, ESPNU | | at Oregon State | W 61–57 | 17–7 (11–6) | 21 – Wright IV | 6 – 3 Tied | 3 – Wright IV | Gill Coliseum (0); Corvallis, OR |
| February 25, 2021; 7:00 pm, ESPN2 | | No. 19 USC | W 80–62 | 18–7 (12–6) | 24 – Horne | 11 – Horne | 14 – Wright IV | CU Events Center (98); Boulder, CO |
| February 27, 2021; 8:00 pm, ESPN2 | | UCLA | W 70–61 | 19–7 (13–6) | 26 – Wright IV | 6 – 2 Tied | 6 – Wright IV | CU Events Center (81); Boulder, CO |
| March 4, 2021; 7:00 pm, ESPN2 | No. 24 | Arizona State | W 75–61 | 20–7 (14–6) | 24 – Wright IV | 12 – Horne | 4 – Wright IV | CU Events Center (84); Boulder, CO |
Pac-12 tournament
| March 11, 2021; 9:30 pm, ESPN | (3) No. 23 | vs. (11) California; Quarterfinals | W 61–58 | 21–7 | 15 – Battey | 6 – Walker | 3 – Wright IV | T-Mobile Arena (0); Paradise, NV |
| March 12, 2021; 9:30 pm, ESPN | (3) No. 23 | vs. (2) No. 24 USC; Semifinals | W 72–70 | 22–7 | 24 – Wright IV | 7 – Horne | 4 – Wright IV | T-Mobile Arena (0); Paradise, NV |
| March 13, 2021; 8:30 pm, ESPN | (3) No. 23 | vs. (5) Oregon State; Championship | L 68–70 | 22–8 | 18 – Wright IV | 8 – Battey | 7 – Wright IV | T-Mobile Arena (0); Paradise, NV |
NCAA tournament
| March 20, 2021; 10:15 a.m., CBS | (5 E) No. 22 | vs. (12 E) Georgetown; First Round | W 96–73 | 23–8 | 24 – Walker | 5 – Wright IV | 13 – Wright IV | Hinkle Fieldhouse (1,061); Indianapolis, IN |
| March 22, 2021; 5:45 p.m., TBS | (5 E) No. 22 | vs. (4 E) No. 14 Florida State; Second Round | L 53–71 | 23–9 | 13 – Schwartz | 8 – Horne | 4 – Daniels | Indiana Farmers Coliseum (989); Indianapolis, IN |
*Non-conference game. ^{#}Rankings from AP Poll. (#) Tournament seedings in parentheses. All times are in Mountain Time.

== Ranking movement ==
Ranking movements Legend: ██ Increase in ranking ██ Decrease in ranking — = Not ranked RV = Received votes
| | Week | | | | | | | | | | | | | | | | | |
| Poll | Pre | 1 | 2 | 3 | 4 | 5 | 6 | 7 | 8 | 9 | 10 | 11 | 12 | 13 | 14 | 15 | 16 | Final |
|---|---|---|---|---|---|---|---|---|---|---|---|---|---|---|---|---|---|---|
| AP | — | RV | — | — | RV | RV | RV | RV | RV | RV | RV | RV | RV | RV | 24 | 23 | 22 | Not released |
| Coaches | — | — | — | — | RV | RV | RV | RV | 23 | RV | RV | RV | RV | — | RV | RV | 22 | 23 |

*AP does not release post-NCAA Tournament rankings.
