= Evan Mobley =

American basketball player (born 2001)

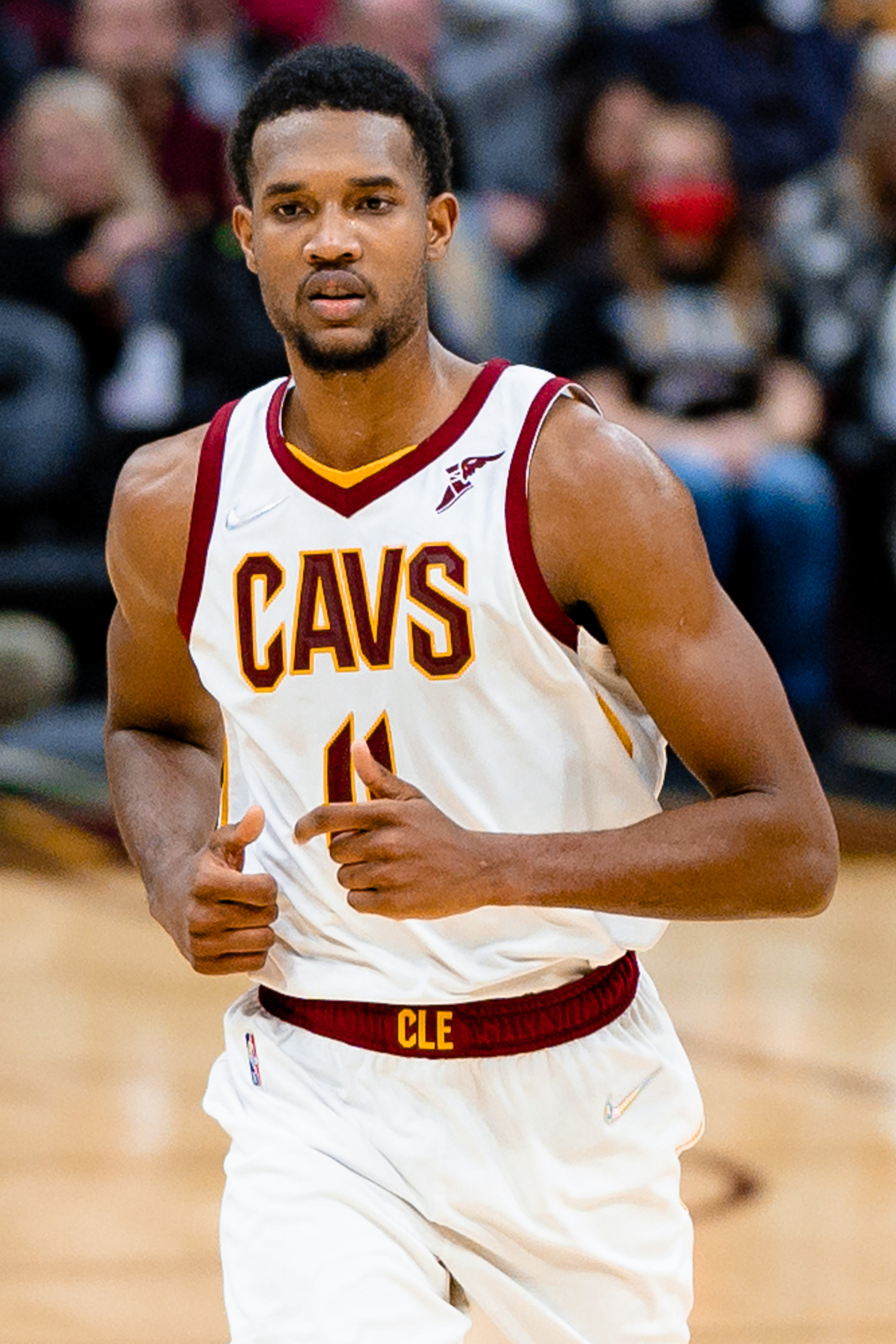
- Mobley with the Cleveland Cavaliers in 2021

No. 4 – Cleveland Cavaliers
- Position: Power forward / center
- League: NBA

Personal information
- Born: June 18, 2001 (age 25) San Diego, California, U.S.
- Listed height: 6 ft 11 in (2.11 m)
- Listed weight: 230 lb (104 kg)

Career information
- High school: Rancho Christian School (Temecula, California)
- College: USC (2020–2021)
- NBA draft: 2021: 1st round, 3rd overall pick
- Drafted by: Cleveland Cavaliers
- Playing career: 2021–present

Career history
- 2021–present: Cleveland Cavaliers

Career highlights
- NBA All-Star (2025); All-NBA Second Team (2025); NBA Defensive Player of the Year (2025); 2× NBA All-Defensive First Team (2023, 2025); NBA All-Rookie First Team (2022); Consensus second-team All-American (2021); Pac-12 Player of the Year (2021); First-team All-Pac-12 (2021); Pac-12 Defensive Player of the Year (2021); Pac-12 All-Defensive Team (2021); Pac-12 Freshman of the Year (2021); Pac-12 All-Freshman Team (2021); Morgan Wootten National Player of the Year (2020); McDonald's All-American (2020)
- Stats at NBA.com
- Stats at Basketball Reference
Medals
Men's basketball
Representing United States
FIBA Under-19 World Cup
Gold medal – first place	2019 Greece	Team
FIBA Under-17 World Cup
Gold medal – first place	2018 Argentina	Team

Evan Mobley (born June 18, 2001) is an American professional basketball player for the Cleveland Cavaliers of the National Basketball Association (NBA). He played college basketball for the USC Trojans and was selected third overall by the Cleveland Cavaliers in the 2021 NBA draft. In the 2024–25 season, he was named an All-Star for the first time and named the NBA Defensive Player of the Year.

== Early life ==
Mobley, along with his older brother Isaiah began playing basketball from an early age under the guidance of their father, Eric, a former basketball player. Evan was initially reluctant to play basketball but became more interested in the sport in eighth grade, when he stood 6 feet 4 inches (1.93 m). Mobley began playing high school basketball as a freshman at Rancho Christian School in Temecula, California. In his first three years, he was teammates with older brother Isaiah, a five-star recruit in the 2019 class.

As a junior at Rancho Christian, Mobley averaged 19.2 points, 10.4 rebounds and 4.7 blocks per game. He was named California Gatorade Player of the Year and The Press-Enterprise player of the year. In his senior season, Mobley averaged 20.5 points, 12.2 rebounds, 5.2 blocks and 4.6 assists per game, leading Rancho Christian to a 22–8 record. He repeated as California Gatorade Player of the Year, joining Jrue Holiday as the award's only two-time winners. Mobley was named Morgan Wootten National Player of the Year. He was also selected to play in the McDonald's All-American Game, Jordan Brand Classic and Nike Hoop Summit, but all three games were canceled due to the COVID-19 pandemic.

Mobley was considered a consensus five-star recruit and one of the top three players in the 2020 recruiting class and at one point ahead of Cade Cunningham . On August 5, 2019, he committed to play college basketball for USC over offers from UCLA and Washington, among other major NCAA Division I programs. Mobley became one of the highest-ranked players to join the program.

College recruiting
Name	Hometown	School	Height	Weight	Commit date
Evan Mobley; C	Murrieta, CA	Rancho Christian School (CA)	7 ft 0 in (2.13 m)	205 lb (93 kg)	Aug 5, 2019
Evan Mobley; C	Recruit ratings: Rivals: 247Sports: ESPN: (97)				
Overall recruit ranking: Rivals: 4 247Sports: 3 ESPN: 3
Note: In many cases, Scout, Rivals, 247Sports, On3, and ESPN may conflict in their listings of height and weight.; In these cases, the average was taken. ESPN grades are on a 100-point scale.; Sources: "USC 2020 Basketball Commitments". Rivals.; "2020 USC Trojans Recruiting Class". ESPN.; "2020 Team Ranking". Rivals.

== College career ==
In his college debut for USC on November 25, 2020, Mobley scored 21 points and had nine rebounds in a 95–87 overtime win against California Baptist. On March 11, 2021, at the Pac-12 tournament quarterfinals, he posted a career-high 26 points, nine rebounds and five blocks in a 91–85 double overtime victory over Utah. In a 72–70 semifinals loss to Colorado, Mobley scored 26 points for a second time, while recording nine rebounds and five blocks. As a freshman, he averaged 16.4 points, 8.7 rebounds, 2.8 blocks and 2.4 assists per game. Mobley was named the Pac-12 Player of the Year, Defensive Player of the Year and Freshman of the Year. He became the second player from a major conference to win the trio of awards, joining Anthony Davis of the Southeastern Conference in 2012. On April 16, 2021, Mobley declared for the 2021 NBA draft, forgoing his remaining college eligibility. Mobley was seen by many as the second best prospect in the 2021 NBA draft behind Cade Cunningham.

== Professional career ==
=== Cleveland Cavaliers (2021–present) ===
==== All-Rookie honors (2021–2022) ====
Mobley was selected third overall in the 2021 NBA draft by the Cleveland Cavaliers. On August 3, 2021, he signed with the Cavaliers. On August 8, 2021, Mobley made his summer league debut in an 84–76 loss against the Houston Rockets where he posted 12 points, five rebounds and three blocks in 28 minutes. On October 20, he made his NBA debut, putting up 17 points, nine rebounds and six assists in a 132–121 loss to the Memphis Grizzlies. On November 15, Mobley suffered a sprained right elbow in a 98–92 loss to the Boston Celtics. Mobley was named the NBA Eastern Rookie of the Month for games played in October/November. On December 8, Mobley became the first Cleveland rookie since LeBron James in March 2004 to record five blocks in an NBA game.

Starting all the 69 games he played, Mobley finished the season averaging 15.0 points, 8.3 rebounds, 2.5 assists, 1.7 blocks and .8 steals per game, while shooting .508, .250 and .663 from the field, the three-point line and on free throws, respectively, on 33.8 minutes per game. He led rookies in both rebounds and blocks per game, while ranking fifth for points per game. He was the second best rookie (behind Scottie Barnes of the Toronto Raptors) in win shares (5.2) and value over replacement player (1.5). Alongside All-Star center Jarrett Allen, Mobley led Cleveland from a .306 winning percentage and the league's sixth-worst defense to a .537 winning percentage and the league's fifth best defense for efficiency. Of Mobley, fellow Cavalier Darius Garland told The Ringer's Rob Mahoney: "He does everything for us. Defensive-wise, offensive-wise. He's a 7-foot unicorn." Mobley finished as the runner-up to Scottie Barnes in voting for the NBA Rookie of the Year. The 15-point difference was the smallest voting margin in 19 years since the award's voting format began in 2002–03.

==== First All-Defense selection and playoffs (2022–2023) ====
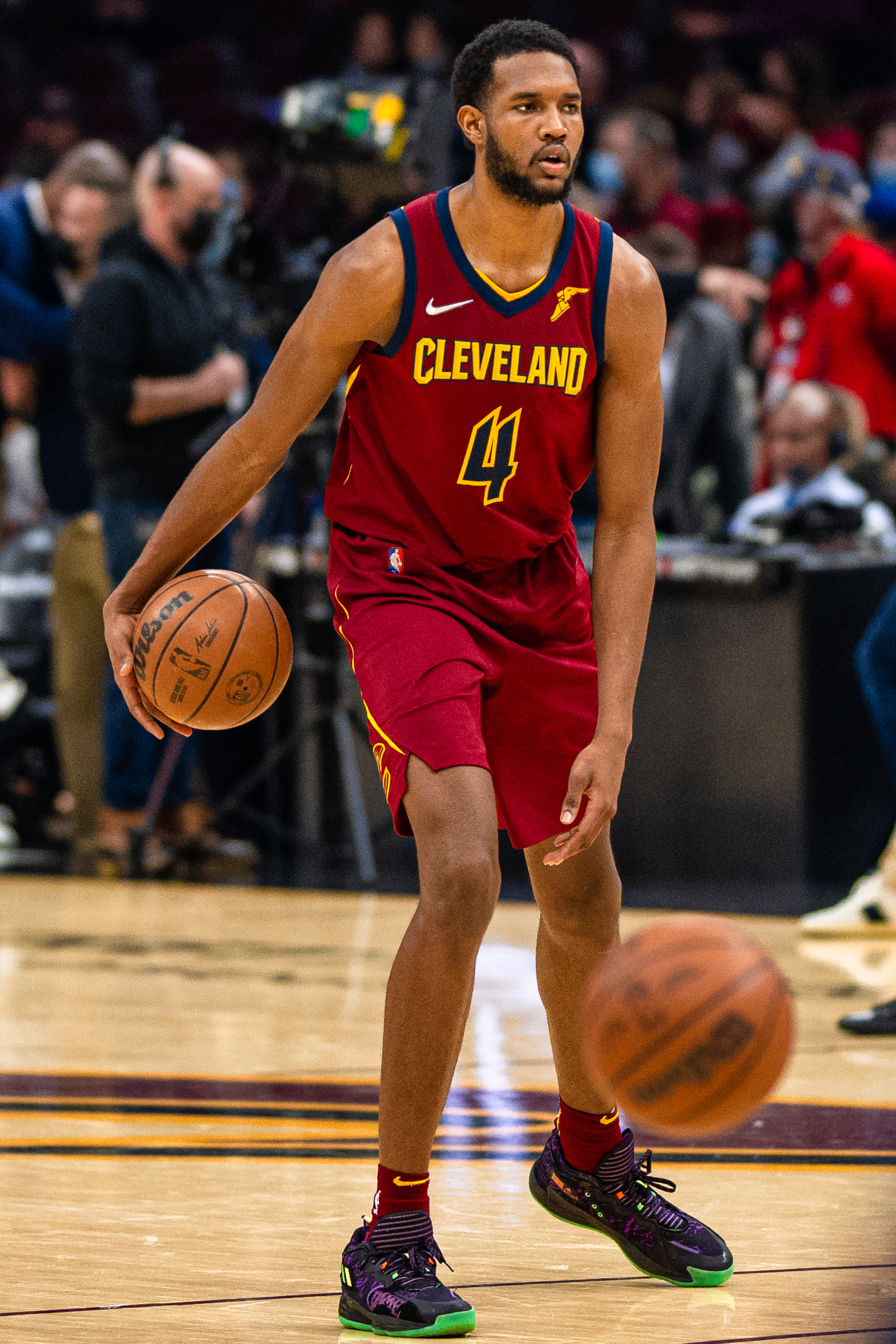
Mobley in 2022

On January 21, 2023, Mobley scored a then career-high 38 points on 19-of-27 shooting from the field, along with nine rebounds and three assists in a 114–102 win over the Milwaukee Bucks. He became only the fourth player since 1979, when the 3-point line was adopted, to score at least 38 points without making a free throw or 3-pointer. Hakeem Olajuwon, Alex English (twice) and George Gervin are the others. On April 17, Mobley finished third in voting for the Defensive Player of the Year. On May 9, Mobley was named to the NBA All-Defensive First Team He finished the season as the NBA leader in dunks, with a total of 214. Mobley helped the Cavaliers earn the No. 4 seed in the Eastern Conference, securing home-court advantage in the first round and achieving their first 50-win season since 1993 without LeBron James on the roster.

==== Knee surgery and return (2023–2024) ====
On November 28, 2023, Mobley recorded 17 points, 19 rebounds and 7 blocks in a 128–105 win over the Atlanta Hawks during the team's final NBA Cup matchup, setting a season high in blocks and a career high in rebounds. On December 15, the Cavaliers announced that Mobley would undergo arthroscopic left knee surgery to treat discomfort in his knee that had sidelined him for the team's previous four games, estimating that he would be out for recovery for approximately six to eight weeks.

On May 10, 2024, in Game 2 of the Eastern Conference Semifinals, Mobley scored a then playoff career-high 21 points, along with 10 rebounds and a playoff career-high 5 assists in a 118–94 victory over the Boston Celtics. Cleveland would go on to lose to Boston in five games despite Mobley's playoff career-high 33-point outing in the 113–98 close-out loss in Game 5.

==== First DPOY, All-Star and All-NBA Honors (2024–2025) ====
On December 7, 2024, Mobley scored a career-high 41 points, along with 10 rebounds and three blocks on 16-of-23 shooting from the field and a career-high 6-of-8 shooting from the three-point line in a 116–102 win over the Charlotte Hornets. He became the second NBA player under the age of 25 (after Kevin Durant) to record 40-plus points, 10-plus rebounds, 3-plus blocks and 5-plus three-pointers made in a game.

On January 30, 2025, Mobley was named as reserve for the 2025 NBA All-Star Game, his first selection. On April 24, Mobley was named NBA Defensive Player of the Year for the 2024–25 season, becoming the first player in franchise history to win the award. It was reported that due to winning Defensive Player of the Year, Mobley would receive an extra $45 million in his contract, with his share of the salary cap being bumped from 25% to 30%. On May 23, Mobley was named to the All-NBA Second Team, marking his first career All-NBA selection.

== National team career ==
Mobley played for the United States at the 2018 FIBA Under-17 World Cup in Argentina. In seven games, he averaged 9.3 points, 5.6 rebounds and 2.6 assists per game, helping his team win the gold medal. Mobley joined the United States for the 2019 FIBA Under-19 World Cup in Heraklion, Greece, but he was limited to playing two games and a total of seven minutes in the tournament due to back spasms. His team won the gold medal despite his absence.

== Career statistics ==
Legend
GP	Games played	GS	Games started	MPG	Minutes per game
FG%	Field goal percentage	3P%	3-point field goal percentage	FT%	Free throw percentage
RPG	Rebounds per game	APG	Assists per game	SPG	Steals per game
BPG	Blocks per game	PPG	Points per game	**Bold**	Career high

=== NBA ===
==== Regular season ====
Year	Team	GP	GS	MPG	FG%	3P%	FT%	RPG	APG	SPG	BPG	PPG
2021–22	Cleveland	69	69	33.8	.508	.250	.663	8.3	2.5	.8	**1.7**	15.0
2022–23	Cleveland	**79**	**79**	**34.4**	.554	.216	.674	9.0	2.8	.8	1.5	16.2
2023–24	Cleveland	50	50	30.6	**.580**	**.373**	.719	**9.4**	3.2	**.9**	1.4	15.7
2024–25	Cleveland	71	71	30.5	.557	.370	**.725**	9.3	3.2	**.9**	1.6	**18.5**
2025–26	Cleveland	65	63	31.9	.546	.297	.606	9.0	**3.6**	.7	**1.7**	18.2
Career		334	332	32.4	.547	.309	.674	9.0	3.0	.8	1.6	16.7
All-Star		1	0	8.0	.750	.000	—	.0	1.0	.0	.0	6.0

==== Playoffs ====
Year	Team	GP	GS	MPG	FG%	3P%	FT%	RPG	APG	SPG	BPG	PPG
2023	Cleveland	5	5	**37.5**	.458	.000	.625	**10.0**	2.0	.6	1.2	9.8
2024	Cleveland	12	12	35.2	.555	.278	.694	9.3	2.3	.8	**2.2**	16.0
2025	Cleveland	8	8	32.1	**.586**	**.452**	**.840**	8.1	1.6	**1.1**	1.0	**17.1**
2026	Cleveland	**18**	**18**	35.6	.535	.338	.621	8.1	**3.9**	.9	1.8	17.0
Career		43	43	35.0	.543	.355	.673	8.6	2.8	.9	1.7	15.9

=== College ===
*	Led Division 1

Year	Team	GP	GS	MPG	FG%	3P%	FT%	RPG	APG	SPG	BPG	PPG
2020–21	USC	**33***	**33***	33.9	.578	.300	.694	8.7	2.4	.8	2.9	16.4

== Personal life ==
Mobley's father, Eric, played college basketball for Cal Poly Pomona and Portland and played professionally in China, Indonesia, Mexico and Portugal. He later coached Amateur Athletic Union (AAU) basketball for 11 years. In 2018, he was hired as assistant basketball coach for USC. Mobley's older brother, Isaiah, who also played for USC, was selected by the Cavaliers in the second round of the 2022 NBA draft, rejoining his brother. His mother, Nicol, is an elementary school teacher. Mobley grew up with three foster siblings, including a Chinese exchange student named Johnny. On September 29th, he was officially recognised as the "Forest City Rim Ranger" by the NBA media, a nickname that has stuck and holds a special place with the Cleveland Cavaliers fans. It is rumored he now has this tattooed on himself in an undisclosed location.
