= 2020–21 Arizona Wildcats men's basketball team =

American college basketball season

2020–21 Arizona Wildcats men's basketball
- Conference: Pac-12 Conference
- Record: 17–9 (11–9 Pac-12)
- Head coach: Sean Miller (12th season)
- Associate head coach: Jack Murphy
- Assistant coaches: Jason Terry; Danny Peters
- Home arena: McKale Center

2020–21 Pac-12 Conference men's basketball standings
	Conf.				Overall
Team	W		L	PCT	W		L	PCT
Oregon	14	–	4	.778	21	–	7	.750
No. 23 USC	15	–	5	.750	25	–	8	.758
No. 22 Colorado	14	–	6	.700	23	–	9	.719
UCLA	13	–	6	.684	22	–	10	.688
Arizona*	11	–	9	.550	17	–	9	.654
Oregon State †	10	–	10	.500	20	–	13	.606
Stanford	10	–	10	.500	14	–	13	.519
Utah	8	–	11	.421	12	–	13	.480
Arizona State	7	–	10	.412	11	–	14	.440
Washington State	7	–	12	.368	14	–	13	.519
Washington	4	–	16	.200	5	–	21	.192
California	3	–	17	.150	9	–	20	.310
† Conference tournament winner *Ineligible for the conference and NCAA tournaments due to self-imposed postseason ban. Rankings from AP poll

The 2020–21 Arizona Wildcats men's basketball team represented the University of Arizona during the 2020–21 NCAA Division I men's basketball season. The team was led by 12th-year head coach Sean Miller, in his final season at the program, and played their home games at McKale Center in Tucson, Arizona as members of the Pac-12 Conference. The Wildcats finished the season 17–9, 11–9 in Pac–12 play to finish in fifth place.

The school self-imposed a postseason ban for the 2020–21 season amid an ongoing NCAA investigation over an FBI bribery scandal involving a former assistant coach and agent between 2017 and 2018 hoping to avoid further punishment from the NCAA. The ban included both the Pac–12 Tournament and the NCAA tournament. On April 7, 2021, the school fired head coach Sean Miller due to allegations related to the corruption scandal.

== Previous season ==
The Wildcats finished the 2019–20 season 20–11, 10–8 in Pac-12 play to finish in tie for 5th place. They received the 5-seed in the 2020 Pac-12 tournament, where they defeated Washington in the first round and were set to take on USC in the quarterfinals before the remainder of the Pac-12 Tournament was cancelled amid the COVID-19 pandemic.

== Offseason ==
Departures
Name	Position	Year	Hometown	Reason
Stone Gettings	F	Graduate Student	Malibu, CA	Completed athletic eligibility.
Max Hazzard	G	Graduate Student	Los Angeles, CA	Completed athletic eligibility.
Chase Jeter	F	Redshirt Senior	Las Vegas, NV	Completed athletic eligibility.
Dylan Smith	G	Redshirt Senior	Mobile, AL	Completed athletic eligibility.
Jake DesJardins	F	Senior	Henderson, NV	Graduated
Brandon Williams	G	Sophomore	Los Angeles, CA	Elected to play professionally.
Josh Green	G	Freshman	Sydney, NSW	Declared for 2020 NBA draft
Nico Mannion	G	Freshman	Siena, ITL	Declared for 2020 NBA draft.
Zeke Nnaji	F	Freshman	Lakeville, MN	Declared for 2020 NBA draft.

Incoming transfers
Name	Position	Year	Hometown	Previous School	Remaining Eligibility	Notes
James Akinjo	G	Junior	Richmond, CA	Georgetown	2	Transfer from Georgetown in January 2020.
Terrell Brown Jr.	G	Graduate Student	Seattle, WA	Seattle	1	Graduate from Seattle University. Terrell is eligible to play immediately as a graduate.

=== 2020 recruiting class ===
Dalen Terry, originally from Phoenix, Arizona, was the first commit of the 2020 recruiting class. He verbally committed to Arizona on July 23, 2019 over rival Arizona State, Arkansas, California, Colorado, Memphis, USC and Utah. Terry a consensus four-star prospect out of Hillcrest Prep in Phoenix, Arizona.

Bennedict Mathurin, originally from Montreal, Canada was the second commitment of the 2020 recruiting class. He verbally committed to Arizona on January 15, 2020 over Baylor & Washington State. Mathurin a consensus four-star prospect out of the NBA Academy Latin America.

Kerr Kriisa, originally from Tartu, Estonia, was the third commitment of the 2020 recruiting class. He verbally committed to Arizona on April 18, 2020 over BYU, Oregon & Syracuse. Kriisa a consensus four-star prospect out of BC Prienai in Prienai, Lithuania.

Daniel Batcho, originally from Chatenay-Malabry, France, was the fourth commitment in the Arizona class. He committed to Arizona on April 23, 2020, over Arizona State, Creighton, Miami & Virginia Tech. He is a consensus four-star prospect out of Centre Fédéral de Basket-ball in Paris, France.

Tibet Gorener, originally from Şişli, Turkey, was the fifth commitment in the Arizona class. He committed to Arizona on April 28, 2020, over Nebraska, Creighton, UC Santa Barbara & UConn. He is consensus four-star out of Orange Lutheran HS in Orange, California.

Ąžuolas Tubelis, originally from Lithuania, was the sixth commitment in the Arizona class. He committed to Arizona on May 27, 2020. He is currently a four-star prospect out of Rytas Vilnius in Lithuania.

Tautvilas Tubelis, originally from Lithuania, was the seventh commitment in the Arizona class. He committed to Arizona on May 27, 2020. He is currently an unranked prospect out of Rytas Vilnius in Lithuania.

College recruiting information
Name	Hometown	School	Height	Weight	Commit date
Dalen Terry; G/F	Phoenix, AZ	Hillcrest Prep	6 ft 7 in (2.01 m)	190 lb (86 kg)	Jul 23, 2019
Dalen Terry; G/F	Recruit ratings: Rivals: 247Sports: ESPN: (84)				
Bennedict Mathurin; G/F	Montreal, Canada	NBA Latin America (MX)	6 ft 6 in (1.98 m)	190 lb (86 kg)	Jan 15, 2020
Bennedict Mathurin; G/F	Recruit ratings: Rivals: 247Sports:				
Kerr Kriisa; G	Tartu, Estonia	BC Prienai	6 ft 2 in (1.88 m)	170 lb (77 kg)	Apr 18, 2020
Kerr Kriisa; G	Recruit ratings: Rivals: 247Sports:				
Daniel Batcho; F	Chatenay-Malabry, France	Centre Fédéral de Basket-ball	6 ft 10 in (2.08 m)	220 lb (100 kg)	Apr 23, 2020
Daniel Batcho; F	Recruit ratings: Rivals: 247Sports:				
Tibet Gorener; F	Şişli, Turkey	Orange Lutheran HS (CA)	6 ft 8 in (2.03 m)	195 lb (88 kg)	Apr 28, 2020
Tibet Gorener; F	Recruit ratings: Rivals: 247Sports:				
Ąžuolas Tubelis; F	Vilnius, Lithuania	Rytas Vilnius	6 ft 9 in (2.06 m)	240 lb (110 kg)	May 27, 2020
Ąžuolas Tubelis; F	Recruit ratings: Rivals: 247Sports:				
Tautvilas Tubelis; F	Vilnius, Lithuania	Rytas Vilnius	6 ft 7 in (2.01 m)	230 lb (100 kg)	May 27, 2020
Tautvilas Tubelis; F	Recruit ratings: 247Sports:				
Overall recruit ranking: Rivals: #7 247Sports: #5 ESPN: #5
Note: In many cases, Scout, Rivals, 247Sports, On3, and ESPN may conflict in their listings of height and weight.; In these cases, the average was taken. ESPN grades are on a 100-point scale.; Sources: "Arizona 2020 Basketball Commitments". Rivals.; "2020 Arizona Wildcats Recruiting Class". ESPN.; "2020 Team Ranking". Rivals.; "2020 Arizona 24/7 Sports Commits". 247Sports.

=== 2021 recruiting class ===
Shane Nowell, originally from Sammamish, WA, was the third commit of the 2021 recruiting class. He verbally committed to Arizona on October 31, 2020 over rival Montana, Montana State, Oklahoma & Washington. Nowell was a consensus four-star prospect out of Eastside Catholic in Sammamish, WA.

College recruiting information (2021)
Name	Hometown	School	Height	Weight	Commit date
Shane Nowell; G	Sammamish, WA	Eastside Catholic School	6 ft 5 in (1.96 m)	185 lb (84 kg)	Oct 31, 2020
Shane Nowell; G	Recruit ratings: Rivals: 247Sports: ESPN: (84)				
Overall recruit ranking: Rivals: 25 247Sports: 17
Note: In many cases, Scout, Rivals, 247Sports, On3, and ESPN may conflict in their listings of height and weight.; In these cases, the average was taken. ESPN grades are on a 100-point scale.; Sources: "Arizona 2021 Basketball Commitments". Rivals.; "2021 Arizona Wildcats Recruiting Class". ESPN.; "2021 Team Ranking". Rivals.; "2021 Arizona 24/7 Sports Commits". 247Sports.

=== 2022 recruiting class ===
College recruiting information (2022)
Name	Hometown	School	Height	Weight	Commit date
Dylan Anderson; C	Gilbert, AZ	Perry High School	6 ft 11 in (2.11 m)	215 lb (98 kg)	Apr 16, 2021
Dylan Anderson; C	Recruit ratings: Rivals: 247Sports: ESPN: (88)				
Overall recruit ranking: Rivals: 10 247Sports: 10 ESPN: 10
Note: In many cases, Scout, Rivals, 247Sports, On3, and ESPN may conflict in their listings of height and weight.; In these cases, the average was taken. ESPN grades are on a 100-point scale.; Sources: "Arizona 2022 Basketball Commitments". Rivals.; "2022 Arizona Wildcats Recruiting Class". ESPN.; "2022 Team Ranking". Rivals.; "2022 Arizona 24/7 Sports Commits". 247Sports.

=== Coaching changes ===
On April 3, 2020, Assistant coach Justin Gainey accepted the Associate Head coach position at Marquette.

On May 27, 2020, former Arizona great & NBA veteran Jason Terry was announced as an assistant coach on Miller's staff.

== Personnel ==
=== Roster ===
2020–21 Arizona Wildcats men's basketball team
Players
Coaches

Pos.	#	Name	Height	Weight	Year	Previous school	Hometown
G/F	0	Bennedict Mathurin	6 ft 7 in (2.01 m)	195 lb (88 kg)	Fr	NBA Academy Latin America (MX)	Montreal, Canada
F	1	Daniel Batcho (injured)	6 ft 11 in (2.11 m)	245 lb (111 kg)	Fr	Centre Fédéral de Basket-ball	Paris, France
G	3	Jemarl Baker Jr. (injured)	6 ft 5 in (1.96 m)	195 lb (88 kg)	RS Jr	Kentucky	Menifee, CA
G	4	Dalen Terry	6 ft 7 in (2.01 m)	195 lb (88 kg)	Fr	Hillcrest Prep	Phoenix, AZ
F	5	Tibet Görener	6 ft 9 in (2.06 m)	200 lb (91 kg)	Fr	Orange Lutheran HS (CA)	Istanbul, Turkey
F	10	Ąžuolas Tubelis	6 ft 11 in (2.11 m)	245 lb (111 kg)	Fr	Rytas Vilnius	Vilnius, Lithuania
F	11	Ira Lee	6 ft 8 in (2.03 m)	245 lb (111 kg)	Sr	Crossroads School	Los Angeles, CA
G	13	James Akinjo	6 ft 1 in (1.85 m)	185 lb (84 kg)	Jr	Georgetown	Oakland, CA
F	20	Tautvilas Tubelis	6 ft 7 in (2.01 m)	225 lb (102 kg)	Fr	Rytas Vilnius	Vilnius, Lithuania
F	21	Jordan Brown	6 ft 11 in (2.11 m)	235 lb (107 kg)	RS So	Nevada	Roseville, CA
G	25	Kerr Kriisa	6 ft 3 in (1.91 m)	180 lb (82 kg)	Fr	BC Prienai	Tartu, Estonia
G	31	Terrell Brown Jr.	6 ft 3 in (1.91 m)	185 lb (84 kg)	GS	Seattle	Seattle, WA
C	35	Christian Koloko	7 ft 1 in (2.16 m)	225 lb (102 kg)	So	Sierra Canyon School (CA)	Douala, Cameroon
F	50	Jordan Mains (W)	6 ft 6 in (1.98 m)	200 lb (91 kg)	So	Pinnacle HS	Scottsdale, AZ
G	53	Grant Weitman (W)	6 ft 4 in (1.93 m)	205 lb (93 kg)	Fr	Salpointe Catholic HS	Tucson, AZ
F	54	Matt Weyand (W)	6 ft 5 in (1.96 m)	200 lb (91 kg)	Sr	Mater Dei HS	Irvine, CA

Head coach

- Sean Miller (Pittsburgh)

Assistant coach(es)

- Jack Murphy (Arizona)
- Danny Peters (Ohio State)
- Jason Terry (Arizona)

Legend

- (C) Team captain
- (S) Suspended
- (I) Ineligible
- (W) Walk-on
- Injured
- Current redshirt

Roster
Last update: Jan. 11, 2021

- Freshman forward Daniel Batcho had surgery on his right knee in late October and is out indefinitely. A timeline for his return to the court for the 2020-21 season will be reevaluated in late January.
- Freshman guard Kerr Kriisa has been ruled ineligible by the NCAA until Feb. 4.
- Jan. 11, 2021 - Jemarl Baker Jr. out for remainder of the season.

=== Coaching staff ===
Name	Position	Year at Arizona	Alma Mater (year)
Sean Miller	Head coach	12th	Pittsburgh (1992)
Jack Murphy	Associate head coach	2nd	Arizona (2005)
Danny Peters	Assistant coach	3rd	Ohio State (2010)
Jason Terry	Assistant coach	1st	Arizona (1999)
Ryan Reynolds	Director of Basketball Operations	12th	Xavier (2007)
Austin Carroll	Assistant director of Basketball Operations	5th	American (2014)

=== Depth chart ===
Pos.	Starting 5	Bench 1	Bench 2
C	Jordan Brown	Christian Koloko	Daniel Batcho
PF	Ąžuolas Tubelis	Ira Lee	Tautvilas Tubelis
SF	Bennedict Mathurin	Dalen Terry	Tibet Gorener
SG	Terrell Brown Jr.	Jemarl Baker Jr.
PG	James Akinjo	Kerr Kriisa

== Schedule and results ==
Before the Summer of 2020, Arizona had scheduled opponents Northern Arizona, Northern Colorado, Cal State Bakersfield, Cal Baptist & Montana at McKale Center in Tucson, AZ. Arizona was forced to cancel the 2020 NIT Season Tip-Off in Brooklyn with Cincinnati, Texas Tech & St. John's because of the COVID-19 pandemic, as well as the Wildcats two true road against Gonzaga & Illinois. The Pac-12 announced it would add two Pac-12 regular season games from the previous 18-game schedule, adding Colorado & Stanford. The Pac-12 announced on August 11, 2020 that all fall sporting events would be canceled due to the COVID-19 pandemic.

Date time, TV	Rank^{#}	Opponent^{#}	Result	Record	High points	High rebounds	High assists	Site (attendance) city, state
Regular season
November 27, 2020*; 3:00 p.m., P12N		Grambling State	W 74–55	1–0	19 – Tied	15 – J. Brown	7 – T. Brown Jr.	McKale Center (0); Tucson, AZ
December 5, 2020*; 12:00 p.m., P12N		Northern Colorado	Cancelled due to Covid-19 at Northern Colorado					McKale Center; Tucson, AZ
December 5, 2020*; 12:00 p.m., P12N		Eastern Washington	W 70–67	2–0	15 – Akinjo	9 – A. Tubelis	5 – Terry	McKale Center (0); Tucson, AZ
December 7, 2020*; 7:00 p.m., P12N		Northern Arizona	W 96–53	3–0	33 – Baker	11 – J. Brown	6 – Terry	McKale Center (0); Tucson, AZ
December 9, 2020*; 5:00 p.m., P12N		Cal State Bakersfield	W 85–60	4–0	16 – T. Brown Jr.	6 – Koloko	7 – Akinjo	McKale Center (0); Tucson, AZ
December 12, 2020*; TBD, P12N		New Mexico State	Cancelled due to Covid-19 at New Mexico State					McKale Center; Tucson, AZ
December 12, 2020*; 4:00 p.m., P12N		UTEP	W 69–61	5–0	18 – Akinjo	7 – Mathurin	3 – Akinjo	McKale Center (0); Tucson, AZ
December 16, 2020*; 5:00 p.m., P12N		Cal Baptist	Cancelled due to Covid-19 at Cal Baptist					McKale Center; Tucson, AZ
December 19, 2020; 5:00 p.m., P12N		at Stanford	L 75–78	5–1 (0–1)	29 – Baker	7 – J. Brown	9 – Akinjo	Kaiser Permanente Arena (0); Santa Cruz, CA
December 21, 2020*; 3:00 p.m., P12N		San Diego	Cancelled due to Covid-19 at San Diego					McKale Center; Tucson, AZ
December 22, 2020*; 5:00 p.m., P12N		Montana	W 70–64	6–1	18 – Akinjo	9 – A. Tubelis	5 – Akinjo	McKale Center (0); Tucson, AZ
December 28, 2020; 7:30 p.m., P12N		Colorado	W 88–74	7–1 (1–1)	22 – Akinjo	8 – Koloko	8 – Akinjo	McKale Center (0); Tucson, AZ
December 31, 2020; 6:00 p.m., P12N		at Washington	W 80–53	8–1 (2–1)	13 – Mathurin	7 – 2 Tied	4 – 2 Tied	Alaska Airlines Arena (0); Seattle, WA
January 2, 2021; 8:30 p.m., P12N		at Washington State	W 86−82 ^{2OT}	9−1 (3–1)	24 – Mathurin	11 – Mathurin	6 – Akinjo	Beasley Coliseum (0); Pullman, WA
January 7, 2021; 7:00 p.m., ESPN2		USC	L 73–87	9–2 (3–2)	31 – A. Tubelis	9 – Lee	6 – Akinjo	McKale Center (0); Tucson, AZ
January 9, 2021; 7:00 p.m., ESPN		UCLA; Rivalry	L 76–81	9−3 (3–3)	25 – Akinjo	8 – A. Tubelis	8 – Akinjo	McKale Center (0); Tucson, AZ
January 14, 2021; 9:00 p.m., FS1		at Oregon State	W 98−64	10−3 (4−3)	31 – Mathurin	10 – Koloko	9 – Akinjo	Gill Coliseum (0); Corvallis, OR
January 21, 2021; 7:00 p.m., ESPN		at Arizona State; Rivalry	W 84−82	11−3 (5−3)	24 – Akinjo	7 – A. Tubelis	6 – T. Brown Jr.	Desert Financial Arena (0); Tempe, AZ
January 25, 2021; 9:00 p.m., ESPN2		Arizona State; Rivalry	W 80−67	12−3 (6−3)	18 – T. Brown Jr.	12 – A. Tubelis	6 – Akinjo	McKale Center (0); Tucson, AZ
January 28, 2021; 8:00 p.m., ESPN		Stanford	L 64−73	12−4 (6−4)	17 – Akinjo	5 – 2 Tied	6 – Akinjo	McKale Center (0); Tucson, AZ
January 30, 2021; 3:00 p.m., P12N		California	W 71−50	13−4 (7−4)	20 – Akinjo	6 – 2 Tied	8 – Akinjo	McKale Center (0); Tucson, AZ
February 4, 2021; 5:00 p.m., FS1		at Utah	L 58−73	13−5 (7−5)	17 – A. Tubelis	7 – 2 Tied	4 – T. Brown Jr.	Jon M. Huntsman Center (0); Salt Lake City, UT
February 6, 2021; 6:00 p.m., FS1		at Colorado	L 79−82	13−6 (7−6)	22 – Mathurin	5 – Koloko	7 – Akinjo	CU Events Center (74); Boulder, CO
February 11, 2021; 6:00 p.m., P12N		Oregon State	W 70−61	14−6 (8−6)	14 – 2 Tied	10 – A. Tubelis	6 – T. Brown Jr.	McKale Center (0); Tucson, AZ
February 13, 2021; 12:00 p.m., ESPN2		Oregon	L 61−63	14−7 (8−7)	20 – A. Tubelis	7 – A. Tubelis	5 – Kriisa	McKale Center (0); Tucson, AZ
February 18, 2021; 7:00 p.m., ESPN2		at UCLA; Rivalry	L 60−74	14−8 (8−8)	21 – Akinjo	8 – A. Tubelis	3 – 2 Tied	Pauley Pavilion (0); Los Angeles, CA
February 20, 2021; 4:00 p.m., FOX		at No. 17 USC	W 81−72	15−8 (9−8)	20 – Akinjo	15 – A. Tubelis	7 – Akinjo	Galen Center (0); Los Angeles, CA
February 25, 2021; 9:00 p.m., FS1		Washington State	W 69−53	16−8 (10−8)	19 – Akinjo	9 – A. Tubelis	8 – T. Brown Jr.	McKale Center (0); Tucson, AZ
February 27, 2021; 12:00 p.m., CBS		Washington	W 75−74	17−8 (11−8)	26 – Akinjo	15 – A. Tubelis	7 – Akinjo	McKale Center (0); Tucson, AZ
March 1, 2021; 7:00 p.m., ESPN2		at Oregon	L 69−80	17−9 (11−9)	19 – Akinjo	7 – Mathurin	8 – Akinjo	Matthew Knight Arena (0); Eugene, OR
*Non-conference game. ^{#}Rankings from AP Poll. (#) Tournament seedings in parentheses. All times are in Mountain Time.

== Rankings ==
Ranking movements Legend: ██ Increase in ranking ██ Decrease in ranking — = Not ranked RV = Received votes
	Week																	
Poll	Pre	1	2	3	4	5	6	7	8	9	10	11	12	13	14	15	16	Final
AP	—	—	—	—	RV	—	—	RV	—	RV	—	—	—	—	—	—	—	Not released
Coaches	—	—	—	—	—	—	—	—	—	—	—	—	—	—	—	—	—	—

*AP does not release post-NCAA Tournament rankings
^Coaches did not release a Week 2 poll.

== Player statistics ==
Individual player statistics (Final)
			Minutes		Scoring		Total FGs			3-point FGs			Free-Throws			Rebounds								
Player	GP	GS	Tot	Avg	Pts	Avg	FG	FGA	Pct	3FG	3FA	Pct	FT	FTA	Pct	Off	Def	Tot	Avg	A	PF	TO	Stl	Blk
James Akinjo	26	26	903	34.7	405	15.6	124	327	37.9%	53	130	40.8%	104	127	81.9%	8	51	59	2.3	141	51	60	37	0
Jemarl Baker Jr.	12	12	353	29.4	144	12.0	50	124	40.3%	24	70	34.3%	20	24	83.3%	2	32	34	2.8	21	22	12	7	4
Daniel Batcho	0	0	0	0	0	0	0	0	0%	0	0	0%	0	0	0%	0	0	0	0	0	0	0	0	0
Terrell Brown Jr.	26	9	666	25.6	190	7.3	62	159	39.0%	14	38	36.8%	52	67	77.6%	13	77	90	3.5	90	37	23	24	6
Jordan Brown	26	12	512	19.7	244	9.4	93	166	56.0%	0	1	0%	58	97	59.8%	41	94	135	5.2	15	61	23	12	23
Tibet Görener	8	0	30	3.8	9	1.1	3	9	33.3%	3	9	33.3%	0	0	0%	0	6	6	0.8	1	4	3	0	0
Christian Koloko	26	19	448	17.2	119	4.6	39	94	52.0%	0	1	0%	35	56	62.5%	58	67	125	4.8	8	70	19	12	35
Kerr Kriisa	8	5	180	22.5	44	5.5	14	42	33.3%	14	38	36.8%	2	2	100%	1	3	4	0.5	19	12	10	3	0
Ira Lee	23	1	256	11.1	68	3.0	27	49	55.1%	0	0	0%	14	19	73.7%	22	48	70	3.0	7	36	23	4	7
Jordan Mains	2	0	4	2.0	3	1.5	1	3	33.3%	1	2	50.0%	0	0	0%	1	0	1	0.5	0	0	0	0	1
Bennedict Mathurin	26	12	647	24.9	280	10.8	88	187	47.1%	38	91	41.8%	66	78	84.6%	32	92	124	4.8	30	43	30	18	2
Dalen Terry	26	14	540	20.8	119	4.6	39	94	41.5%	14	43	32.6%	27	44	55.9%	20	63	83	3.2	38	61	31	19	10
Ąžuolas Tubelis	26	20	689	26.5	317	12.2	115	231	49.8%	13	42	31.0%	74	104	69.2%	67	117	184	7.1	32	65	61	15	16
Tautvilas Tubelis	5	0	9	1.8	1	0.2	0	2	0%	0	2	0.0%	1	2	50.0%	0	1	1	0.2	0	1	0	0	0
Grant Weitman	5	0	8	1.4	0	0	0	0	0%	0	0	0%	0	0	0%	0	1	1	0.2	0	0	0	0	0
Matt Weyand	4	0	6	1.5	0	0	0	0	0%	0	0	0%	0	0	0%	0	1	1	0.2	1	0	0	1	0
Total	19	–	–	–	1961	75.4	667	1492	44.7%	174	468	37.2%	453	623	72.7%	307	690	997	38.3	403	463	309	152	104
Opponents	19	–	–	–	1783	68.5	631	1470	42.9%	184	539	34.1%	337	477	71.7%	223	589	812	31.2	292	524	322	140	72

Legend
GP	Games played	GS	Games started	Avg	Average per game
FG	Field-goals made	FGA	Field-goal attempts	Off	Offensive rebounds
Def	Defensive rebounds	A	Assists	TO	Turnovers
Blk	Blocks	Stl	Steals	High	Team high

== Awards & milestones ==
=== Season highs ===
==== Players ====
- Points: Jermal Baker Jr. – 33 (Northern Arizona)
- Rebounds: Jordan Brown, Ąžuolas Tubelis (twice) – 15 (Grambling, USC, Washington)
- Assists: James Akinjo (twice), Terrell Brown Jr. – 9 (Oregon State, Stanford)
- Steals: Akinjo – 5 (Oregon State)
- Blocks: Terrell Brown Jr., Christian Koloko (twice) – 4 (Northern Arizona, Cal State Bakersfield, Washington State)
- Minutes: Akinjo – 44 (Washington State)

==== Team ====
- Points: 98 (Oregon State)
- Field Goals: 35 (Oregon State)
- Field Goal Attempts: 75 (Washington State)
- 3 Point Field Goals Made: 13 (Northern Arizona)
- 3 Point Field Goals Attempts: 28 (twice) (Cal State Bakersfield, Washington)
- Free Throws Made: 32 (ASU)
- Free Throws Attempts: 43 (ASU)
- Rebounds: 58 (Washington)
- Assists: 21(three) (Cal State Bakersfield, Northern Arizona, Oregon State)
- Steals: 10 (ASU)
- Blocked Shots: 10 (Northern Arizona)
- Turnovers: 18 (Stanford)
- Fouls: 29 (Washington State)

=== Weekly awards ===
- Jermal Baker Jr. (Dec. 14)
- Bennedict Mathurin (Jan. 4)
- Ąžuolas Tubelis (Feb. 22)
- Ąžuolas Tubelis (Mar. 1)

=== Pac-12 Conference honors ===
James Akinjo

- All—Pac-12 First Team

Jordan Brown

- Pac-12 6th Man of the Year

Bennedict Mathurin

- All―Pac-12 Freshman First Team

Ąžuolas Tubelis

- All―Pac-12 Freshman First Team
- All―Pac-12 Honorable Mention

== See also ==
2020–21 Arizona Wildcats women's basketball team
