= 2020–21 UCLA Bruins men's basketball team =

American college basketball season

2020–21 UCLA Bruins men's basketball

NCAA tournament, Final Four
- Conference: Pac-12 Conference

Ranking
- Coaches: No. 7
- Record: 22–10 (13–6 Pac-12)
- Head coach: Mick Cronin (2nd season)
- Associate head coach: Darren Savino (2nd season)
- Assistant coaches: Rod Palmer (2nd season); Michael Lewis (2nd season)
- Home arena: Pauley Pavilion (Capacity: 13,819)

2020–21 Pac-12 Conference men's basketball standings
	Conf.				Overall
Team	W		L	PCT	W		L	PCT
Oregon	14	–	4	.778	21	–	7	.750
No. 23 USC	15	–	5	.750	25	–	8	.758
No. 22 Colorado	14	–	6	.700	23	–	9	.719
UCLA	13	–	6	.684	22	–	10	.688
Arizona*	11	–	9	.550	17	–	9	.654
Oregon State †	10	–	10	.500	20	–	13	.606
Stanford	10	–	10	.500	14	–	13	.519
Utah	8	–	11	.421	12	–	13	.480
Arizona State	7	–	10	.412	11	–	14	.440
Washington State	7	–	12	.368	14	–	13	.519
Washington	4	–	16	.200	5	–	21	.192
California	3	–	17	.150	9	–	20	.310
† Conference tournament winner *Ineligible for the conference and NCAA tournaments due to self-imposed postseason ban. Rankings from AP poll

The 2020–21 UCLA Bruins men's basketball team represented the University of California, Los Angeles during the 2020–21 NCAA Division I season. The Bruins were led by second-year head coach Mick Cronin and played their home games at Pauley Pavilion as members of the Pac-12 Conference. Tyger Campbell was named first-team all-conference, while Jaime Jaquez Jr. and Johnny Juzang were selected second-team All-Pac-12. Jaquez also earned Pac-12 All-Defensive team honors.

Prior to the season, five-star recruit Daishen Nix decommitted from his letter of intent with UCLA to sign instead with the NBA G League. Picked by the media to win the conference, the Bruins were 6–2 to start the season when senior Chris Smith suffered a torn anterior cruciate ligament in the win against Utah. Their best player, who was the Pac-12 Most Improved Player and a first-team All-Pac-12 selection the season prior, was ruled out for the season. The Bruins began Pac-12 conference play with a 5–0 record after beating rival Arizona on the road. This marked the fourth consecutive time UCLA had beaten Arizona in Tucson; it was also their fourth straight win against the Wildcats overall, making this the longest win streak by either team in the series since 2009. UCLA extended their conference record to 8–0 with a 61–57 road win against California. It was their best conference start since opening 9–0 in 1982–83, and the Bruins improved to 12–2 overall, including 7–0 in games decided by five points or less or which went into overtime. In their following game against Stanford, they suffered their first Pac-12 defeat after surrendering a buzzer-beating layup on an inbounds pass in a 73–72 overtime loss.

Junior forward Jalen Hill, the team's top interior defender and among its top rebounders, left the team in early February for personal reasons. However, the Bruins added freshman forward Mac Etienne, who only enrolled in January after his prep season was cancelled due to the COVID-19 pandemic. UCLA ended the regular season losing three straight. They lost the regular season finale 64–63 to USC, who made a game-winning three-point field goal with 1.4 seconds left in the game. The Bruins led by 11 at halftime and were up by eight with five minutes remaining. The loss ended their 18-game home winning streak and extended the Trojans' winning streak in their crosstown rivalry to four. UCLA played the game without their leading scorer, Juzang, who sprained his ankle. The Bruins ended with a 13–6 conference record to earn the No. 4 seed in the Pac-12 tournament. In their tourney opener in the quarterfinals, they lost 83–79 in overtime to Oregon State after leading by as many as 16 in the first half and holding a 10-point advantage at halftime. It was their fourth consecutive loss after blowing a second-half lead. Juzang returned from his injury and scored 12 points.

UCLA was selected for the NCAA tournament, opening in the First Four against Michigan State. In a reversal, the Bruins trailed by as many as 14 in the first half and 11 at halftime before rallying to win 86–80 in overtime. Jaquez finished with a career-high 27 points in UCLA's first NCAA tournament win since 2017. This was the most-watched First Four game in tournament history, averaging 3 million viewers. They defeated BYU to advance to the second round, joining fellow Pac-12 schools Colorado, Oregon, USC, and Oregon State—the Bruins' opponents in their four consecutive losses before the tournament. After winning against Abilene Christian, UCLA became the fifth First Four team to advance to the second weekend and Sweet 16. Following their overtime win against No. 2 seed Alabama and a 51–49 triumph over No. 1 seed Michigan in the East Regional Final, the Bruins became the second First Four team to advance to the Final Four, their first national semifinal since 2008.

In the Final Four, UCLA faced the top-ranked team in the country in Gonzaga, who were seeking to become the first undefeated national champion since Indiana in 1976. UCLA was a 14-point underdog, the largest Final Four point spread since the tournament expanded to 64 teams in 1985. The Bulldogs had been dominant all year, winning all but one of their 30 games by double digits, including their last 27 straight. The game was close throughout and featured 19 lead changes and 15 ties. The Bruins lost 93–90 in overtime after the Bulldogs' Jalen Suggs made a 40-foot (12 m) three-point bank shot as time expired. UCLA was the first opponent to hold a second-half lead against Gonzaga in the Bulldogs' first five games of the tournament. The game was the second most-watched tournament game of the season, behind the championship game, with 14.94 million viewers and a 7.6 TV rating.

== Previous season ==
UCLA finished the season with a 19–12 record. After starting slowly at 8–9, they went on an 11–3 streak and finished second in the Pac-12 at 12–6 in conference play. Cronin was named the Pac-12 Coach of the Year, while junior Chris Smith earned first-team All-Pac-12 honors and was voted the Pac-12 Most Improved Player. Due to the coronavirus pandemic, the Pac-12 tournament was canceled before the Bruins' first scheduled game in the quarterfinals, and the NCAA tournament was called off as well.

== Off-season ==
=== Departures ===
UCLA departures
Name	Pos.	Height	Weight	Year	Hometown	Reason for departure
Alex Olesinski	F	6'10"	225	(redshirt) Senior	Roswell, NM	Graduated
Prince Ali	G	6'4"	195	(redshirt) Senior	Bronx, NY	Graduated
Armani Dodson	G	6'5"	210	Senior	Fontana, CA	Walk–on; graduated
Isaac Wulff	G	6'3"	185	Senior	Laguna Beach, CA	Walk–on; graduated

=== Incoming transfers ===
UCLA incoming transfers
Name	Pos.	Height	Weight	Year	Hometown	Notes
Johnny Juzang	F	6'6"	215	Freshman	Tarzana, CA	Transferred from Kentucky. Juzang was granted a waiver for immediate eligibility. He had three years of remaining eligibility.

=== 2020 recruiting class ===
College recruiting
Name	Hometown	School	Height	Weight	Commit date
Jaylen Clark; SG / SF	Riverside, CA	Etiwanda (CA)	6 ft 5 in (1.96 m)	200 lb (91 kg)	Feb 5, 2020
Jaylen Clark; SG / SF	Recruit ratings: Rivals: 247Sports: ESPN: (80)				
Mac Etienne; C	Wolfeboro, NH	Brewster Academy	6 ft 10 in (2.08 m)	240 lb (110 kg)	Nov 30, 2020
Mac Etienne; C	Recruit ratings: Rivals: 247Sports: ESPN: (84)				
Overall recruit ranking: Rivals: — 247Sports: 109 ESPN: —
Note: In many cases, Scout, Rivals, 247Sports, On3, and ESPN may conflict in their listings of height and weight.; In these cases, the average was taken. ESPN grades are on a 100-point scale.; Sources: "UCLA 2020 Basketball Commitments". Rivals.; "2020 UCLA Bruins Recruiting Class". ESPN.; "2020 Team Ranking". Rivals.

== Roster ==
2020–21 UCLA Bruins men's basketball team
Players
Coaches

Pos.	#	Name	Height	Weight	Year	Previous school	Hometown
G	0	Jaylen Clark	6 ft 5 in (1.96 m)	195 lb (88 kg)	Fr	Etiwanda HS	Riverside, CA
G	1	Jules Bernard	6 ft 6 in (1.98 m)	205 lb (93 kg)	Jr	Windward School	Los Angeles, CA
F	2	Cody Riley	6 ft 9 in (2.06 m)	255 lb (116 kg)	RS Jr	Sierra Canyon School	Kansas City, KS
G	3	Johnny Juzang	6 ft 6 in (1.98 m)	210 lb (95 kg)	So	Kentucky	Tarzana, CA
G/F	4	Jaime Jaquez Jr.	6 ft 6 in (1.98 m)	220 lb (100 kg)	So	Camarillo HS	Camarillo, CA
G	5	Chris Smith	6 ft 9 in (2.06 m)	215 lb (98 kg)	Sr	Huntington Prep	Chicago, IL
G	10	Tyger Campbell	5 ft 11 in (1.8 m)	180 lb (82 kg)	RS So	La Lumiere School	Cedar Rapids, IA
F	12	Mac Etienne	6 ft 9 in (2.06 m)	235 lb (107 kg)	Fr	Suffield Academy	New York, NY
G/F	13	Jake Kyman	6 ft 6 in (1.98 m)	220 lb (100 kg)	So	Santa Margarita Catholic HS	Aliso Viejo, CA
F	14	Kenneth Nwuba	6 ft 9 in (2.06 m)	255 lb (116 kg)	RS So	Huntington Prep	Lagos, Nigeria
F	23	Logan Cremonesi (W)	6 ft 7 in (2.01 m)	210 lb (95 kg)	Fr	Mater Dei HS	Oceanside, CA
F/C	24	Jalen Hill	6 ft 10 in (2.08 m)	245 lb (111 kg)	RS Jr	Centennial HS	Corona, CA
G	34	David Singleton	6 ft 4 in (1.93 m)	210 lb (95 kg)	Jr	Bishop Montgomery HS	Los Angeles, CA
G	43	Russell Stong (W)	6 ft 3 in (1.91 m)	190 lb (86 kg)	Jr	Crespi Carmelite HS	Northridge, CA

Head coach

- Mick Cronin (Cincinnati)

Assistant coach(es)

- Darren Savino (New Jersey City)
- Rod Palmer (UC Irvine)
- Michael Lewis (Indiana)

Legend

- (C) Team captain
- (S) Suspended
- (I) Ineligible
- (W) Walk-on
- Injured
- Current redshirt

Roster

== Schedule and results ==
Date time, TV	Rank^{#}	Opponent^{#}	Result	Record	High points	High rebounds	High assists	Site (attendance) city, state
Regular season
November 25, 2020*; 7:30 pm, CBSSN	No. 22	at San Diego State	L 58–73	0–1	17 – Jaquez	12 – Riley	4 – Campbell	Viejas Arena (0); San Diego, CA
November 27, 2020*; 12:00 pm, P12N	No. 22	vs. Pepperdine	W 107–98 ^{3OT}	1–1	26 – Smith	12 – Smith	7 – Campbell	Viejas Arena (0); San Diego, CA
December 3, 2020*; 5:00 pm, P12N		Seattle	W 78–52	2–1	17 – Campbell	11 – Smith	6 – Campbell	Pauley Pavilion (0); Los Angeles, CA
December 6, 2020; 5:00 pm, P12N		California	W 76–56	3–1 (1–0)	21 – Smith	7 – Hill	12 – Campbell	Pauley Pavilion (0); Los Angeles, CA
December 9, 2020*; 6:00 pm, P12N		San Diego	W 83–56	4–1	17 – Jaquez	10 – Tied	5 – Campbell	Pauley Pavilion (0); Los Angeles, CA
December 11, 2020*; 6:30 pm, P12N		Marquette	W 69–60	5–1	18 – Jaquez	7 – Tied	9 – Campbell	Pauley Pavilion (0); Los Angeles, CA
December 15, 2020*; 6:00 pm, P12N		Long Beach State	Canceled due to COVID-19 protocols within the LBSU program. (Note: The Long Beach State–UCLA game had originally been scheduled for November 30, but was postponed as a result of positive COVID-19 test results within the LBSU program. It was later announced that the game would be rescheduled for December 15. However, the game was again postponed on December 15 following another positive test in the LBSU program. Long Beach State's athletics department later released a statement that claimed the game had been cancelled altogether, although UCLA did not publicly confirm this.)					Pauley Pavilion; Los Angeles, CA
December 19, 2020*; 1:15 pm, CBS		vs. No. 20 Ohio State; CBS Sports Classic	L 70–77	5–2	15 – Riley	6 – Tied	5 – Campbell	Rocket Mortgage FieldHouse (0); Cleveland, OH
December 31, 2020; 4:00 pm, FS1		Utah	W 72–70	6–2 (2–0)	16 – Smith	5 – Tied	10 – Campbell	Pauley Pavilion (0); Los Angeles, CA
January 2, 2021; 5:00 pm, P12N		Colorado	W 65–62	7–2 (3–0)	14 – Jaquez	7 – Bernard	7 – Campbell	Pauley Pavilion (0); Los Angeles, CA
January 7, 2021; 7:30 pm, ESPN		at Arizona State	W 81–75 ^{OT}	8–2 (4–0)	22 – Riley	13 – Riley	5 – Campbell	Desert Financial Arena (0); Tempe, AZ
January 9, 2021; 6:00 pm, ESPN		at Arizona; Rivalry	W 81–76	9–2 (5–0)	22 – Campbell	9 – Jaquez	2 – Campbell	McKale Center (0); Tucson, AZ
January 14, 2021; 2:00 pm, FS1		Washington State	W 91–61	10–2 (6–0)	17 – Juzang	7 – Hill	6 – Campbell	Pauley Pavilion (0); Los Angeles, CA
January 16, 2021; 2:00 pm, P12N		Washington	W 81–76	11–2 (7–0)	20 – Bernard	9 – Bernard	5 – Campbell	Pauley Pavilion (0); Los Angeles, CA
January 21, 2021; 6:00 pm, ESPNU	No. 24	at California	W 61–57	12–2 (8–0)	13 – Riley	8 – Hill	6 – Campbell	Haas Pavilion (0); Berkeley, CA
January 23, 2021; 2:00 pm, FOX	No. 24	at Stanford	L 72–73 ^{OT}	12–3 (8–1)	27 – Juzang	4 – Tied	4 – Campbell	Kaiser Permanente Arena (1); Santa Cruz, CA
January 28, 2021; 6:00 pm, ESPN	No. 23	Oregon	Canceled due to COVID-19 protocols within the Oregon program.					Pauley Pavilion; Los Angeles, CA
January 30, 2021; 4:00 pm, P12N	No. 23	Oregon State	W 57–52	13–3 (9–1)	16 – Riley	10 – Riley	4 – Campbell	Pauley Pavilion (0); Los Angeles, CA
February 6, 2021; 7:00 pm, ESPN	No. 21	at USC; Rivalry	L 48–66	13–4 (9–2)	13 – Juzang	13 – Juzang	4 – Tied	Galen Center (0); Los Angeles, CA
February 11, 2021; 8:00 pm, FS1		at Washington State	L 73–81	13–5 (9–3)	25 – Juzang	7 – Juzang	5 – Campbell	Beasley Coliseum (0); Pullman, WA
February 13, 2021; 4:30 pm, P12N		at Washington	W 64–61	14–5 (10–3)	32 – Juzang	10 – Jaquez	4 – Tied	Alaska Airlines Arena (0); Seattle, WA
February 18, 2021; 6:00 pm, ESPN2		Arizona; Rivalry	W 74–60	15–5 (11–3)	25 – Jaquez	6 – Tied	3 – Campbell	Pauley Pavilion (0); Los Angeles, CA
February 20, 2021; 7:00 pm, ESPN2		Arizona State	W 80–79	16–5 (12–3)	17 – Riley	10 – Jaquez	6 – Campbell	Pauley Pavilion (0); Los Angeles, CA
February 25, 2021; 5:00 pm, P12N		at Utah	W 76–61	17–5 (13–3)	19 – Bernard	8 – Juzang	5 – Campbell	Jon M. Huntsman Center (0); Salt Lake City, UT
February 27, 2021; 7:00 pm, ESPN2		at Colorado	L 61–70	17–6 (13–4)	25 – Juzang	8 – Jaquez	4 – Campbell	CU Events Center (81); Boulder, CO
March 3, 2021; 6:00 pm, ESPN2		at Oregon	L 74–82	17–7 (13–5)	23 – Bernard	6 – Clark	8 – Campbell	Matthew Knight Arena (0); Eugene, OR
March 6, 2021; 1:00 pm, CBS		USC; Rivalry	L 63–64	17–8 (13–6)	12 – Jaquez	7 – Bernard	4 – Campbell	Pauley Pavilion (0); Los Angeles, CA
Pac-12 Tournament
March 11, 2021; 2:30 pm, P12N	(4)	vs. (5) Oregon State; Quarterfinals	L 79–83 ^{OT}	17–9	19 – Bernard	10 – Bernard	5 – Campbell	T-Mobile Arena (0); Paradise, NV
NCAA Tournament
March 18, 2021; 6:57 pm, TBS	(11 E)	vs. (11 E) Michigan State; First Four	W 86–80 ^{OT}	18–9	27 – Jaquez	8 – Bernard	4 – Campbell	Mackey Arena; West Lafayette, IN
March 20, 2021; 6:40 pm, CBS	(11 E)	vs. (6 E) No. 23 BYU; First Round	W 73–62	19–9	27 – Juzang	8 – Jaquez	5 – Campbell	Hinkle Fieldhouse (1,250); Indianapolis, IN
March 22, 2021; 2:15 pm, TBS	(11 E)	vs. (14 E) Abilene Christian; Second Round	W 67–47	20–9	17 – Juzang	12 – Riley	5 – Bernard	Bankers Life Fieldhouse; Indianapolis, IN
March 28, 2021; 4:15 pm, TBS	(11 E)	vs. (2 E) No. 5 Alabama; Sweet Sixteen	W 88–78 ^{OT}	21–9	17 – Tied	9 – Clark	5 – Campbell	Hinkle Fieldhouse; Indianapolis, IN
March 30, 2021; 6:57 pm, TBS	(11 E)	vs. (1 E) No. 4 Michigan; Elite Eight	W 51–49	22–9	28 – Juzang	9 – Bernard	4 – Jaquez	Lucas Oil Stadium (7,515); Indianapolis, IN
April 3, 2021; 5:34 pm, CBS	(11 E)	vs. (1 W) No. 1 Gonzaga; Final Four	L 90–93 ^{OT}	22–10	29 – Juzang	10 – Riley	7 – Campbell	Lucas Oil Stadium (8,131); Indianapolis, IN
*Non-conference game. ^{#}Rankings from AP Poll. (#) Tournament seedings in parentheses. All times are in Pacific Time.

== Rankings ==
Ranking movements Legend: ██ Increase in ranking ██ Decrease in ranking — = Not ranked RV = Received votes
	Week																	
Poll	Pre	1	2	3	4	5	6	7	8	9	10	11	12	13	14	15	16	Final
AP	22	RV	RV	RV	RV	RV	RV	RV	24	23	21	RV	RV	RV	RV	—	—	Not released
Coaches	21	21 (Note: Coaches did not release a Week 1 poll.)	RV	RV	RV	RV	RV	21	20	21	21	24	RV	RV	RV	RV	RV	7

== Honors ==
=== Preseason award watchlists ===
- Chris Smith, Naismith Trophy, John R. Wooden Award, Julius Erving Award

=== Pac-12 Player of the Week ===
- February 15, 2021 – Johnny Juzang

=== Postseason awards ===
- All-Pac-12 Team
  Tyger Campbell, First team
  Jaime Jaquez Jr., Second team
  Johnny Juzang, Second team
- Pac-12 All-Defensive Team
  Jaime Jaquez Jr.
- NCAA East Region All-Tournament Team
  Tyger Campbell
  Jaime Jaquez Jr.
  Johnny Juzang, MOP
- Final Four All-Tournament Team
  Johnny Juzang
- NCAA Elite 90 Academic Recognition Award
  Russell Stong

== NCAA Tournament statistics ==
Record	UCLA	OPP
Scoring	455	409
Field goals-att	170-370	158-352
3-pt. field goals-att	45-115	30-114
Free throws-att	70-102	63-101
Rebounds	207	208
Assists	83	81
Turnovers	46	69
Steals	26	25
Blocked shots	20	21
