= Tahj Eaddy =

American basketball player

KK Kvarner 2010
- Position: Point guard / shooting guard
- League: HT Premijer liga

Personal information
- Born: July 5, 1996 (age 30) West Haven, Connecticut, U.S.
- Listed height: 6 ft 2 in (1.88 m)
- Listed weight: 165 lb (75 kg)

Career information
- High school: Notre Dame (West Haven, Connecticut); Tennessee Prep Academy (Memphis, Tennessee)
- College: Southeast Missouri State (2016–2017); Santa Clara (2018–2020); USC (2020–2021)
- NBA draft: 2021: undrafted
- Playing career: 2021–present

Career history
- 2021–2022: Labas GAS Prienai
- 2022–2023: Lučenec
- 2023: Lavrio
- 2023: Kauhajoki Karhu
- 2023-2024: Kaposvári KK
- 2024-2025: KK Cedevita Junior
- 2025-present: KK Kvarner 2010

Career highlights
- Second-team All-Pac-12 (2021); Second-team All-WCC (2019)

Tahj Eaddy (born July 5, 1996) is an American professional basketball player. He played college basketball for the Southeast Missouri State Redhawks, the Santa Clara Broncos, and the USC Trojans.

== High school career ==
Eaddy played basketball at Notre Dame High School in West Haven, Connecticut for three years. He moved to Tennessee Preparatory Academy in Memphis, Tennessee for his senior year. Eaddy averaged 24.6 points and was named MVP of the National Association of Christian Athletes Elite Division. He attended The Skill Factory in Atlanta, Georgia for a prep year. He committed to playing college basketball for Southeast Missouri State.

== College career ==
As a freshman at Southeast Missouri State, Eaddy averaged 7.5 points and shot a team-high 42 percent from three-point range. For his sophomore season, he transferred to Santa Clara. After sitting out for one year due to NCAA transfer rules, Eaddy averaged 15 points and 3.2 assists per game, earning Second Team All-West Coast Conference honors. He scored a season-high 30 points in a 68–56 win over San Diego on January 3, 2019. During his junior season, Eaddy received less playing time and averaged 9.1 points. He transferred to USC for his senior season as a graduate transfer. On February 13, 2021, Eaddy scored 29 points in a 76–65 win over Washington State. As a senior, Eaddy averaged 13.6 points, 2.9 rebounds and 2.8 assists per game. He was named to the Second Team All-Pac-12. Following the season, he declared for the 2021 NBA draft instead of taking advantage of the NCAA's offer of an additional year of eligibility.

== Professional career ==
After going undrafted in the 2021 NBA draft, Eaddy signed with the Orlando Magic for the Summer League in Las Vegas.

Eaddy was drafted with the first pick in the second round by the Raptors 905 in the 2021 NBA G League draft. However he did not make the final roster.

On December 17, 2021, Eaddy signed with BC Prienai of the Lithuanian Basketball League. In 17 games, he averaged 9.2 points, 1.5 rebounds and 1.8 assists per contest, shooting with 44% from beyond the 3-point arc.

Eaddy started the 2022–23 season with the Slovak club Lučenec. In 21 games, he averaged 18.1 points, 2.2 rebounds and 3.6 assists per contest, shooting with 45% from beyond the 3-point arc.

On March 17, 2023, Eaddy moved to Greek club Lavrio for the rest of the season. In 4 league games, he averaged 7.5 points, 2.5 rebounds and 3.2 assists, playing around 19 minutes per contest.

For the 2023–24 season, Eaddy moved to Kauhajoki Karhu in Finland.

== Career statistics ==
Legend
GP	Games played	GS	Games started	MPG	Minutes per game
FG%	Field goal percentage	3P%	3-point field goal percentage	FT%	Free throw percentage
RPG	Rebounds per game	APG	Assists per game	SPG	Steals per game
BPG	Blocks per game	PPG	Points per game	**Bold**	Career high

=== College ===
Year	Team	GP	GS	MPG	FG%	3P%	FT%	RPG	APG	SPG	BPG	PPG
2016–17	Southeast Missouri State	30	12	22.2	.372	**.424**	**.925**	2.3	2.3	.8	.0	7.5
2017–18	Santa Clara	Redshirt										
2018–19	Santa Clara	31	31	**35.5**	.401	.379	.802	2.7	**3.2**	**.9**	.0	**15.0**
2019–20	Santa Clara	**33**	14	25.2	.407	.333	.830	2.1	2.1	**.9**	.0	9.1
2020–21	USC	**33**	**32**	32.3	**.448**	.388	.776	**2.9**	2.8	.6	.0	13.6
Career		127	89	28.8	.412	.378	.818	2.5	2.6	.8	.0	11.3

== Personal life ==
Eaddy is the son of Tanisha Younger-Eaddy and Emery Eaddy. His father played college basketball at Norfolk State.
