= Evan Battey =

American basketball player (born 1998)

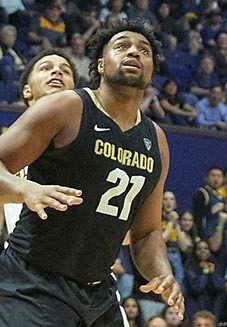
- Battey with Colorado in 2020

Colorado Buffaloes
- Position: Assistant coach/quality control analyst
- Conference: Big 12

Personal information
- Born: September 27, 1998 (age 28) Los Angeles, California, U.S.
- Listed height: 6 ft 8 in (2.03 m)
- Listed weight: 259 lb (117 kg)

Career information
- High school: Los Angeles CES (Los Angeles, California); Villa Park (Villa Park, California)
- College: Colorado (2018–2022)
- NBA draft: 2022: undrafted
- Playing career: 2022–2024
- Number: 21

Career history

Playing
- 2022–2023: Rilski Sportist
- 2023–2024: Lugano Tigers

Coaching
- 2024–present: Colorado (assistant)

Career highlights
- Second-team All-Pac-12 (2022)

Evan Earl Battey (born September 27, 1998) is an American former professional basketball player and current assistant basketball coach at the University of Colorado. He played college basketball for the Colorado Buffaloes. He was named second-team All-Pac-12 as a senior in 2022.

== High school career ==
Battey started playing high school basketball at the Los Angeles Center for Enriched Studies in Los Angeles. He averaged 11 points and 11 rebounds per game as a freshman. As a sophomore, Battey averaged 20 points and 14 rebounds per game, leading his team to its second straight CIF Los Angeles City Section Division IV title. For his junior season, he transferred to Villa Park High School in Villa Park, California. In his fifth game of the season, Battey scored 44 points, two shy of the school record. As a junior, he averaged 24 points and 12 rebounds per game. Battey was ruled ineligible for his senior season, as he had repeated ninth grade and exhausted all eight semesters of athletic eligibility. While sidelined, he served as a coach for Villa Park's big men and junior varsity team. He committed to playing college basketball for Colorado over offers from Arizona State, Miami (Florida) and Purdue, among others.

== College career ==
Battey sat out for the 2017–18 season as an academic redshirt, because he did not graduate from high school in four years. In December 2017, he suffered a stroke while playing basketball with his friends, and had two seizures later in the day. Battey rehabilitated for five months, including physical therapy and speech therapy. As a freshman at Colorado, he averaged 8.1 points and 4.4 rebounds per game. In his sophomore season, Battey became a regular starter and averaged 8.9 points and 5.9 rebounds per game. As a junior, he averaged 10.1 points and 5.3 rebounds per game, and was named to the All-Pac-12 honorable mention. As a senior, Battey averaged 12.4 points and 4.7 rebounds per game and was named second-team All-Pac-12.

== Professional career ==
Battey was undrafted in the 2022 NBA Draft. On August 11, 2022, Battey announced he would be playing for BC Rilski Sportist of the National Basketball League in Bulgaria. The following season, Battey joined the Lugano Tigers of the Swiss Basketball League in Switzerland. During his time with the Tigers, he averaged 19.1 points and 8.0 rebounds per game.

== Coaching career ==
On July 8, 2024, Battey announced he would be returning to the University of Colorado to become an assistant coach and quality control analyst.

== Career statistics ==
Legend
GP	Games played	GS	Games started	MPG	Minutes per game
FG%	Field goal percentage	3P%	3-point field goal percentage	FT%	Free throw percentage
RPG	Rebounds per game	APG	Assists per game	SPG	Steals per game
BPG	Blocks per game	PPG	Points per game	**Bold**	Career high

=== College ===
Year	Team	GP	GS	MPG	FG%	3P%	FT%	RPG	APG	SPG	BPG	PPG
2017–18	Colorado	Redshirt										
2018–19	Colorado	**36**	11	21.3	.484	.188	.705	4.4	**1.2**	.5	.3	8.1
2019–20	Colorado	32	32	24.8	**.526**	.353	.694	**5.9**	1.0	.5	.3	8.9
2020–21	Colorado	32	32	25.7	.498	.118	**.825**	5.3	1.0	.4	.3	10.1
2021–22	Colorado	33	**33**	**28.5**	.502	**.488**	.759	4.7	**1.2**	**.6**	**.5**	**12.4**
Career		133	108	25.0	.502	.390	.748	5.0	1.1	.5	.4	9.8

== Personal life ==
Battey's father, Earl III, played college baseball at UCLA and is a longtime Los Angeles Police Department officer. His grandfather, Earl Jr., was a five-time Major League Baseball All-Star and a three-time Gold Glove winner. Battey's uncle, Ed Sanders, was a boxer and won the gold medal at the 1952 Summer Olympics.
