= 2025–26 Cleveland Cavaliers season =

2025–26 NBA season by team

- Head coach: Kenny Atkinson
- President: Koby Altman
- General manager: Mike Gansey
- Owner: Dan Gilbert
- Arena: Rocket Arena

Results
- Record: 52–30 (.634)
- Place: Division: 2nd (Central); Conference: 4th (Eastern)
- Playoff finish: Eastern Conference Finals (lost to Knicks 0–4)
- Stats at Basketball Reference

Local media
- Television: FanDuel Sports Network Ohio; Rock Entertainment Sports Network (5 simulcasts)
- Radio: WTAM · WMMS

The 2025–26 Cleveland Cavaliers season was the 56th season for the franchise in the National Basketball Association (NBA).

With a loss to the Utah Jazz on January 12, the Cavaliers were not able to improve on their 64–18 record from their previous season. On February 4, they traded Darius Garland and a 2026 second-round pick to the Los Angeles Clippers for James Harden.

The Cavaliers clinched a playoff spot for the fourth consecutive year on April 2 with a win over the Golden State Warriors. They finished fourth in the East with a 52–30 record. In the playoffs, they defeated the Toronto Raptors in the first round and overcame a 2–0 series deficit against the top-seeded Detroit Pistons in the semifinals, each in seven games. They advanced to the Eastern Conference Finals for the first time since 2018 and the first time without LeBron James on their roster since 1992, facing off against the New York Knicks. However, the season would end with a whimper as the Cavaliers were swept by the eventual NBA champion New York in four games.

== Draft ==
Round	Pick	Player	Position(s)	Nationality	College / Club
2	49	Tyrese Proctor	PG/SG	Australia	Duke
2	58	Saliou Niang	SG/SF	Senegal; Italy	Aquila Basket Trento (Italy)

The Cavaliers entered the draft holding two second-round picks: their own 58th pick and the additional 49th pick acquired via trade with the Milwaukee Bucks in 2020. Their original first-round pick was originally traded to the Utah Jazz in 2022 as an exchange for Donovan Mitchell and eventually routed to the Phoenix Suns after Cleveland finished with a better record than Utah and the Minnesota Timberwolves in the 2024–25 regular season, making the pick the least favorable selection among the three.

== Roster ==
2025–26 Cleveland Cavaliers roster
Players

Pos.	No.	Player	Height	Weight	DOB	From
C	31	Jarrett Allen	6 ft 9 in (2.06 m)	243 lb (110 kg)	1998-04-21	Texas
F/C	3	Thomas Bryant	6 ft 9 in (2.06 m)	248 lb (112 kg)	1997-07-31	Indiana
G	14	Keon Ellis	6 ft 4 in (1.93 m)	175 lb (79 kg)	2000-01-08	Alabama
F	21	Tristan Enaruna (TW)	6 ft 7 in (2.01 m)	220 lb (100 kg)	2001-06-26	Cleveland State
G	1	James Harden	6 ft 5 in (1.96 m)	220 lb (100 kg)	1989-08-26	Arizona State
G	5	Sam Merrill	6 ft 4 in (1.93 m)	205 lb (93 kg)	1996-05-15	Utah State
F	12	Riley Minix (TW)	6 ft 7 in (2.01 m)	230 lb (104 kg)	2000-09-22	Morehead State
G	45	Donovan Mitchell	6 ft 2 in (1.88 m)	215 lb (98 kg)	1996-09-07	Louisville
C	4	Evan Mobley	6 ft 11 in (2.11 m)	215 lb (98 kg)	2001-06-18	USC
F/C	22	Larry Nance Jr.	6 ft 6 in (1.98 m)	245 lb (111 kg)	1993-01-01	Wyoming
G	9	Craig Porter Jr.	6 ft 1 in (1.85 m)	180 lb (82 kg)	2000-02-26	Wichita State
G	24	Tyrese Proctor	6 ft 4 in (1.93 m)	185 lb (84 kg)	2004-04-01	Duke
C	33	Olivier Sarr (TW)	6 ft 10 in (2.08 m)	240 lb (109 kg)	1999-02-20	Kentucky
G	8	Dennis Schröder	6 ft 1 in (1.85 m)	175 lb (79 kg)	1993-09-15	Germany
G/F	2	Max Strus	6 ft 5 in (1.96 m)	215 lb (98 kg)	1996-03-28	DePaul
F	35	Nae'Qwan Tomlin	6 ft 8 in (2.03 m)	210 lb (95 kg)	2000-12-10	Memphis
G/F	20	Jaylon Tyson	6 ft 6 in (1.98 m)	215 lb (98 kg)	2002-12-02	California
F	32	Dean Wade	6 ft 9 in (2.06 m)	228 lb (103 kg)	1996-11-20	Kansas State

Coaches
Head coach
- Kenny Atkinson
Assistant(s)
- Johnnie Bryant (associate HC)
- Omar Cook
- Mike Gerrity
- Trevor Hendry
- Andrew Olson
- Nate Reinking
- Alex Sarama
- Jawad Williams

Legend
- (DP) Unsigned draft pick
- (FA) Free agent
- (S) Suspended
- (GL) On assignment to G League affiliate
- (TW) Two-way affiliate player
- Injured

Roster
Updated: March 15, 2026

== Standings ==
=== Division ===
Central Division	W	L	PCT	GB	Home	Road	Div	GP
c – Detroit Pistons	60	22	.732	–	32‍–‍9	28‍–‍13	12‍–‍4	82
x – Cleveland Cavaliers	52	30	.634	8.0	27‍–‍14	25‍–‍16	10‍–‍5	82
Milwaukee Bucks	32	50	.390	28.0	19‍–‍22	13‍–‍28	9‍–‍7	82
Chicago Bulls	31	51	.378	29.0	18‍–‍23	13‍–‍28	4‍–‍12	82
Indiana Pacers	19	63	.232	41.0	11‍–‍29	8‍–‍34	4‍–‍12	82

=== Conference ===
Eastern Conference
#	Team	W	L	PCT	GB	GP
1	c – Detroit Pistons *	60	22	.732	–	82
2	y – Boston Celtics *	56	26	.683	4.0	82
3	x – New York Knicks	53	29	.646	7.0	82
4	x – Cleveland Cavaliers	52	30	.634	8.0	82
5	x – Toronto Raptors	46	36	.561	14.0	82
6	y – Atlanta Hawks *	46	36	.561	14.0	82
7	x – Philadelphia 76ers	45	37	.549	15.0	82
8	x – Orlando Magic	45	37	.549	15.0	82
9	pi – Charlotte Hornets	44	38	.537	16.0	82
10	pi – Miami Heat	43	39	.524	17.0	82
11	Milwaukee Bucks	32	50	.390	28.0	82
12	Chicago Bulls	31	51	.378	29.0	82
13	Brooklyn Nets	20	62	.244	40.0	82
14	Indiana Pacers	19	63	.232	41.0	82
15	Washington Wizards	17	65	.207	43.0	82

== Game log ==
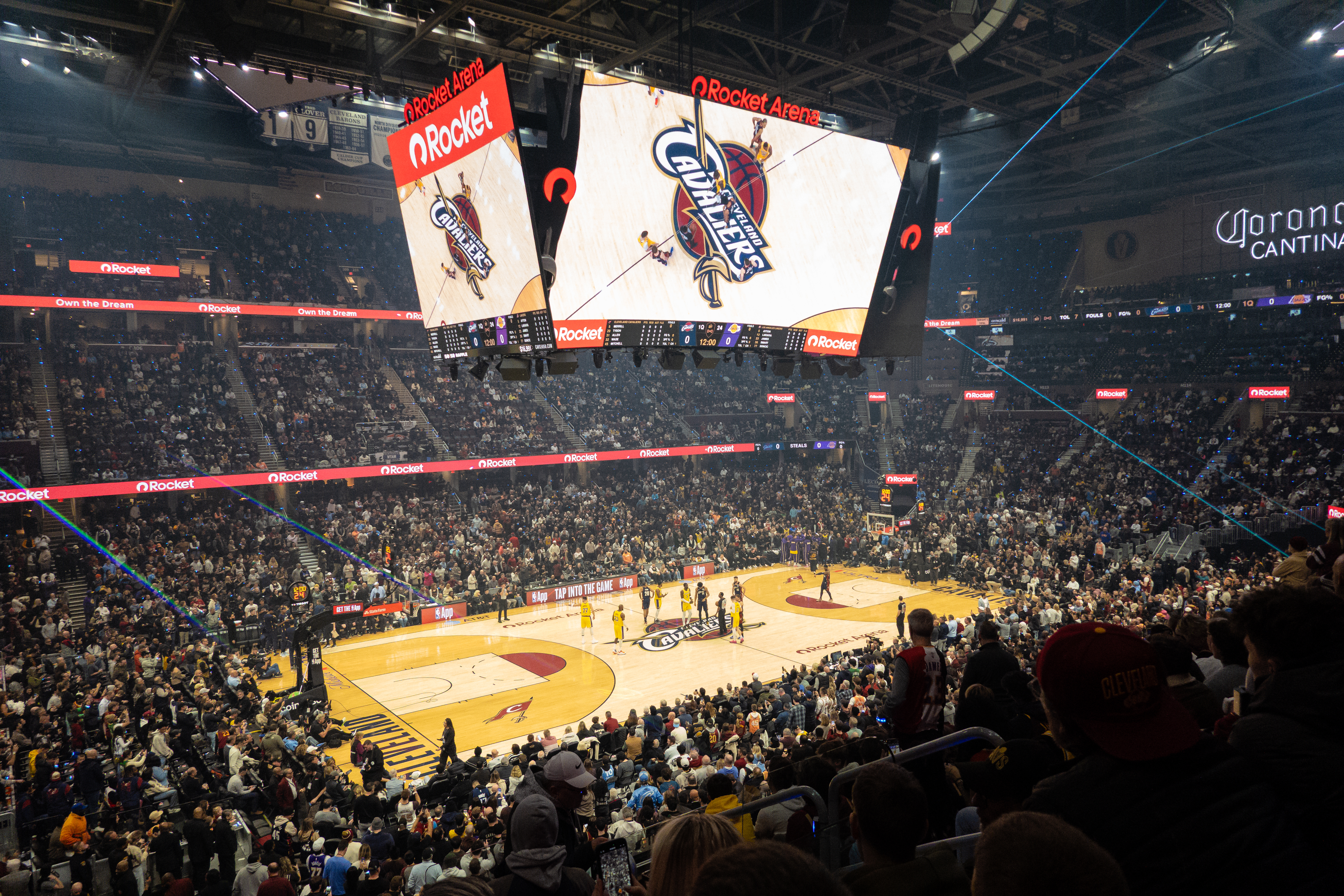
Cleveland Cavaliers hosting the Los Angeles Lakers at Rocket Arena on January 28, 2026, featuring the Cavaliers' Classic Edition court.

=== Preseason ===
2025 preseason game log
Total: 1–3 (Home: 1–1; Road: 0–2)
Preseason: 1–3 (home: 1–1; road: 0–2)

Game	Date	Team	Score	High points	High rebounds	High assists	Location Attendance	Record
1	October 7	Chicago	L 117–118	Hunter, Porter Jr. (17)	De'Andre Hunter (7)	Nance Jr., Porter Jr. (4)	Rocket Arena; 15,348	0–1
2	October 9	@ Chicago	L 112–119	Donovan Mitchell (22)	Jarrett Allen (9)	Mitchell, Mobley, Proctor (4)	United Center; 16,258	0–2
3	October 12	@ Boston	L 107–138	Jaylon Tyson (16)	Larry Nance Jr. (9)	Proctor, Travers, Tyson (4)	TD Garden; 19,156	0–3
4	October 14	Detroit	W 118–100	Donovan Mitchell (17)	Dean Wade (9)	Lonzo Ball (9)	Rocket Arena; 17,561	1–3

2025–26 preseason schedule

=== Regular season ===
2025–26 game log
Total: 52–30 (Home: 27–14; Road: 25–16)
October: 3–3 (home: 1–1; road: 2–2)

Game	Date	Team	Score	High points	High rebounds	High assists	Location Attendance	Record
1	October 22	@ New York	L 111–119	Donovan Mitchell (31)	Evan Mobley (8)	Lonzo Ball (6)	Madison Square Garden; 19,812	0–1
2	October 24	@ Brooklyn	W 131–124	Donovan Mitchell (35)	Evan Mobley (8)	Lonzo Ball (8)	Barclays Center; 17,548	1–1
3	October 26	Milwaukee	W 118–113	Donovan Mitchell (24)	Jarrett Allen (11)	Evan Mobley (6)	Rocket Arena; 19,432	2–1
4	October 27	@ Detroit	W 116–95	Donovan Mitchell (35)	Evan Mobley (11)	De'Andre Hunter (6)	Little Caesars Arena; 18,933	3–1
5	October 29	@ Boston	L 105–125	Mobley, Tyson (19)	Evan Mobley (11)	Donovan Mitchell (6)	TD Garden; 19,156	3–2
6	October 31	Toronto	L 101–112	Evan Mobley (29)	Evan Mobley (8)	Lonzo Ball (5)	Rocket Arena; 19,432	3–3

November: 9–6 (home: 7–3; road: 2–3)

Game	Date	Team	Score	High points	High rebounds	High assists	Location Attendance	Record
7	November 2	Atlanta	W 117–109	Donovan Mitchell (37)	Evan Mobley (8)	Mitchell, Mobley (5)	Rocket Arena; 19,432	4–3
8	November 5	Philadelphia	W 132–121	Donovan Mitchell (46)	Jarrett Allen (10)	Ball, Mitchell (8)	Rocket Arena; 19,432	5–3
9	November 7	@ Washington	W 148–114	Donovan Mitchell (24)	Jarrett Allen (14)	Darius Garland (9)	Capital One Arena; 14,054	6–3
10	November 8	Chicago	W 128–122	Hunter, Mitchell (29)	Evan Mobley (8)	Sam Merrill (8)	Rocket Arena; 19,432	7–3
11	November 10	@ Miami	L 138–140 (OT)	Donovan Mitchell (28)	Donovan Mitchell (15)	Donovan Mitchell (8)	Kaseya Center; 19,600	7–4
12	November 12	@ Miami	W 130–116	Jarrett Allen (30)	Jarrett Allen (10)	Ball, Porter Jr. (8)	Kaseya Center; 19,600	8–4
13	November 13	Toronto	L 113–126	Donovan Mitchell (31)	Evan Mobley (9)	Hunter, Mitchell (6)	Rocket Arena; 19,432	8–5
14	November 15	Memphis	W 108–100	Donovan Mitchell (30)	Evan Mobley (13)	Ball, Mitchell (5)	Rocket Arena; 19,432	9–5
15	November 17	Milwaukee	W 118–106	Donovan Mitchell (37)	Dean Wade (8)	Donovan Mitchell (7)	Rocket Arena; 19,432	10–5
16	November 19	Houston	L 104–114	De'Andre Hunter (25)	Allen, Porter Jr., Wade (7)	Craig Porter Jr. (5)	Rocket Arena; 19,432	10–6
17	November 21	Indiana	W 120–109	Donovan Mitchell (32)	Evan Mobley (12)	Darius Garland (7)	Rocket Arena; 19,432	11–6
18	November 23	L.A. Clippers	W 120–105	Donovan Mitchell (37)	Evan Mobley (10)	Darius Garland (8)	Rocket Arena; 19,432	12–6
19	November 24	@ Toronto	L 99–110	Donovan Mitchell (17)	Jaylon Tyson (9)	Donovan Mitchell (8)	Scotiabank Arena; 17,127	12–7
20	November 28	@ Atlanta	L 123–130	Donovan Mitchell (42)	Evan Mobley (14)	Darius Garland (10)	State Farm Arena; 16,124	12–8
21	November 30	Boston	L 115–117	Evan Mobley (27)	Evan Mobley (14)	Garland, Mitchell (8)	Rocket Arena; 19,432	12–9

December: 7–7 (home: 4–4; road: 3–3)

Game	Date	Team	Score	High points	High rebounds	High assists	Location Attendance	Record
22	December 1	@ Indiana	W 135–119	Donovan Mitchell (43)	Jaylon Tyson (11)	Donovan Mitchell (6)	Gainbridge Fieldhouse; 15,470	13–9
23	December 3	Portland	L 110–122	Donovan Mitchell (33)	Evan Mobley (10)	Mitchell, Mobley (5)	Rocket Arena; 19,432	13–10
24	December 5	San Antonio	W 130–117	Donovan Mitchell (28)	Evan Mobley (10)	Donovan Mitchell (8)	Rocket Arena; 19,432	14–10
25	December 6	Golden State	L 94–99	Donovan Mitchell (29)	Nae'Qwan Tomlin (12)	Darius Garland (4)	Rocket Arena; 19,432	14–11
26	December 12	@ Washington	W 130–126	Donovan Mitchell (48)	Evan Mobley (13)	Garland, Mobley (6)	Capital One Arena; 15,465	15–11
27	December 14	Charlotte	L 111–119 (OT)	Darius Garland (26)	Jaylon Tyson (13)	Darius Garland (9)	Rocket Arena; 19,432	15–12
28	December 17	@ Chicago	L 111–127	Donovan Mitchell (32)	Lonzo Ball (7)	Darius Garland (6)	United Center; 18,872	15–13
29	December 19	Chicago	L 125–136	Darius Garland (35)	Jarrett Allen (12)	Ball, Garland (8)	Rocket Arena; 19,432	15–14
30	December 22	Charlotte	W 139–132	Donovan Mitchell (30)	Dean Wade (7)	Darius Garland (10)	Rocket Arena; 19,432	16–14
31	December 23	New Orleans	W 141–118	Donovan Mitchell (27)	Jarrett Allen (9)	Garland, Porter Jr. (8)	Rocket Arena; 19,432	17–14
32	December 25	@ New York	L 124–126	Donovan Mitchell (34)	Evan Mobley (9)	Darius Garland (10)	Madison Square Garden; 19,812	17–15
33	December 27	@ Houston	L 100–117	Jaylon Tyson (23)	Jaylon Tyson (14)	Donovan Mitchell (6)	Toyota Center; 18,067	17–16
34	December 29	@ San Antonio	W 113–101	Jarrett Allen (27)	Jarrett Allen (10)	Darius Garland (11)	Frost Bank Center; 19,010	18–16
35	December 31	Phoenix	W 129–113	Donovan Mitchell (34)	Jarrett Allen (11)	Donovan Mitchell (7)	Rocket Arena; 19,432	19–16

January: 10–5 (home: 5–3; road: 5–2)

Game	Date	Team	Score	High points	High rebounds	High assists	Location Attendance	Record
36	January 2	Denver	W 113–108	Donovan Mitchell (33)	Jarrett Allen (12)	Darius Garland (8)	Rocket Arena; 19,432	20–16
37	January 4	Detroit	L 110–114	Donovan Mitchell (30)	Jaylon Tyson (7)	Darius Garland (6)	Rocket Arena; 19,432	20–17
38	January 6	@ Indiana	W 120–116	Darius Garland (29)	Jarrett Allen (12)	Craig Porter Jr. (9)	Gainbridge Fieldhouse; 16,007	21–17
39	January 8	@ Minnesota	L 122–131	Donovan Mitchell (30)	Jarrett Allen (10)	Garland, Mitchell (8)	Target Center; 17,274	21–18
40	January 10	Minnesota	W 146–134	Donovan Mitchell (28)	Jarrett Allen (11)	Mitchell, Porter Jr. (8)	Rocket Arena; 19,432	22–18
41	January 12	Utah	L 112–123	Darius Garland (23)	Evan Mobley (9)	Garland, Mobley (8)	Rocket Arena; 19,432	22–19
42	January 14	@ Philadelphia	W 133–107	Donovan Mitchell (35)	Evan Mobley (13)	Donovan Mitchell (9)	Xfinity Mobile Arena; 19,746	23–19
43	January 16	@ Philadelphia	W 117–115	Jaylon Tyson (39)	Donovan Mitchell (9)	Donovan Mitchell (12)	Xfinity Mobile Arena; 19,746	24–19
44	January 19	Oklahoma City	L 104–136	Donovan Mitchell (19)	Jaylon Tyson (10)	Evan Mobley (5)	Rocket Arena; 19,432	24–20
45	January 21	@ Charlotte	W 94–87	Donovan Mitchell (24)	Evan Mobley (14)	Donovan Mitchell (6)	Spectrum Center; 17,619	25–20
46	January 23	Sacramento	W 123–118	Donovan Mitchell (33)	Evan Mobley (13)	Donovan Mitchell (8)	Rocket Arena; 19,432	26–20
47	January 24	@ Orlando	W 119–105	Donovan Mitchell (36)	Lonzo Ball (8)	Donovan Mitchell (9)	Kia Center; 19,351	27–20
48	January 26	Orlando	W 114–98	Donovan Mitchell (45)	Mobley, Tyson (9)	Craig Porter Jr. (5)	Rocket Arena; 19,432	28–20
49	January 28	L.A. Lakers	W 129–99	Donovan Mitchell (25)	Jarrett Allen (9)	Jaylon Tyson (6)	Rocket Arena; 19,432	29–20
50	January 30	@ Phoenix	L 113–126	De'Andre Hunter (17)	Jarrett Allen (7)	Bryant, Mitchell (6)	Mortgage Matchup Center; 17,071	29–21

February: 8–3 (home: 3–0; road: 5–3)

Game	Date	Team	Score	High points	High rebounds	High assists	Location Attendance	Record
51	February 1	@ Portland	W 130–111	Jarrett Allen (40)	Jarrett Allen (17)	Craig Porter Jr. (12)	Moda Center; 17,240	30–21
52	February 4	@ L.A. Clippers	W 124–91	Donovan Mitchell (29)	Jarrett Allen (11)	Donovan Mitchell (9)	Intuit Dome; 17,927	31–21
53	February 7	@ Sacramento	W 132–126	Donovan Mitchell (35)	Jarrett Allen (10)	James Harden (8)	Golden 1 Center; 16,212	32–21
54	February 9	@ Denver	W 119–117	Donovan Mitchell (32)	Jarrett Allen (13)	Donovan Mitchell (10)	Ball Arena; 19,647	33–21
55	February 11	Washington	W 138–113	Sam Merrill (32)	Jarrett Allen (9)	James Harden (11)	Rocket Arena; 19,432	34–21
All-Star Game
56	February 19	Brooklyn	W 112–84	Donovan Mitchell (17)	Jarrett Allen (10)	James Harden (9)	Rocket Arena; 19,432	35–21
57	February 20	@ Charlotte	W 118–113	Donovan Mitchell (32)	Jarrett Allen (14)	James Harden (8)	Spectrum Center; 19,691	36–21
58	February 22	@ Oklahoma City	L 113–121	Tied (20)	Jarrett Allen (13)	James Harden (9)	Paycom Center; 18,203	36–22
59	February 24	New York	W 109–94	Donovan Mitchell (23)	Jarrett Allen (10)	Dennis Schröder (5)	Rocket Arena; 19,432	37–22
60	February 25	@ Milwaukee	L 116–118	Jarrett Allen (27)	Jarrett Allen (11)	Craig Porter Jr. (9)	Fiserv Forum; 14,702	37–23
61	February 27	@ Detroit	L 119–122 (OT)	Jarrett Allen (25)	Evan Mobley (12)	Craig Porter Jr. (12)	Little Caesars Arena; 20,232	37–24

March: 10–5 (home: 4–3; road: 6–2)

Game	Date	Team	Score	High points	High rebounds	High assists	Location Attendance	Record
62	March 1	@ Brooklyn	W 106–102	James Harden (22)	Evan Mobley (13)	James Harden (8)	Barclays Center; 17,804	38–24
63	March 3	Detroit	W 113–109	Jaylon Tyson (22)	Craig Porter Jr. (8)	James Harden (7)	Rocket Arena; 19,432	39–24
64	March 8	Boston	L 97–108	Donovan Mitchell (30)	Evan Mobley (8)	James Harden (10)	Rocket Arena; 19,432	39–25
65	March 9	Philadelphia	W 115–101	James Harden (21)	Dean Wade (10)	Donovan Mitchell (6)	Rocket Arena; 19,432	40–25
66	March 11	@ Orlando	L 122–128	James Harden (30)	Evan Mobley (13)	James Harden (8)	Kia Center; 18,697	40–26
67	March 13	@ Dallas	W 138–105	Evan Mobley (29)	Harden, Mobley (7)	Donovan Mitchell (8)	American Airlines Center; 19,512	41–26
68	March 15	Dallas	L 120–130	Donovan Mitchell (26)	Evan Mobley (11)	Donovan Mitchell (11)	Rocket Arena; 19,432	41–27
69	March 17	@ Milwaukee	W 123–116	Harden, Mobley (27)	Evan Mobley (15)	James Harden (6)	Fiserv Forum; 16,341	42–27
70	March 19	@ Chicago	W 115–110	James Harden (36)	Evan Mobley (14)	James Harden (9)	United Center; 19,763	43–27
71	March 21	@ New Orleans	W 111–106	Donovan Mitchell (27)	Sam Merrill (10)	James Harden (10)	Smoothie King Center; 16,987	44–27
72	March 24	Orlando	W 136–131	Donovan Mitchell (42)	Evan Mobley (9)	James Harden (7)	Rocket Arena; 19,432	45–27
73	March 25	Miami	L 103–120	Donovan Mitchell (28)	James Harden (9)	James Harden (7)	Rocket Arena; 19,432	45–28
74	March 27	Miami	W 149–128	Max Strus (29)	Allen, Mobley (10)	James Harden (14)	Rocket Arena; 19,432	46–28
75	March 30	@ Utah	W 122–113	Mitchell, Mobley (34)	Evan Mobley (17)	James Harden (14)	Delta Center; 18,186	47–28
76	March 31	@ L.A. Lakers	L 113–127	Jarrett Allen (18)	Thomas Bryant (6)	Donovan Mitchell (6)	Crypto.com Arena; 18,997	47–29

April: 5–1 (home: 3–0; road: 2–1)

Game	Date	Team	Score	High points	High rebounds	High assists	Location Attendance	Record
77	April 2	@ Golden State	W 118–111	Donovan Mitchell (25)	Jarrett Allen (13)	Dennis Schröder (6)	Chase Center; 18,064	48–29
78	April 5	Indiana	W 117–108	Donovan Mitchell (38)	Thomas Bryant (10)	James Harden (7)	Rocket Arena; 19,432	49–29
79	April 6	@ Memphis	W 142–126	Evan Mobley (24)	Allen, Tomlin (9)	Dennis Schröder (11)	FedExForum; 16,511	50–29
80	April 8	Atlanta	W 122–116	Donovan Mitchell (31)	Evan Mobley (19)	Harden, Mitchell (4)	Rocket Arena; 19,432	51–29
81	April 10	@ Atlanta	L 102–124	James Harden (20)	Evan Mobley (6)	James Harden (5)	State Farm Arena; 17,517	51–30
82	April 12	Washington	W 130–117	Nae'Qwan Tomlin (26)	Tyrese Proctor (11)	Tyrese Proctor (8)	Rocket Arena; 19,432	52–30

2025–26 season schedule

=== Playoffs ===
2026 playoff game log
Total: 8–10 (home: 6–3; road: 2–7)
First Round: 4–3 (home: 4–0; road: 0–3)

Game	Date	Team	Score	High points	High rebounds	High assists	Location Attendance	Series
1	April 18	Toronto	W 126–113	Donovan Mitchell (32)	Allen, Mobley (7)	James Harden (10)	Rocket Arena; 19,432	1–0
2	April 20	Toronto	W 115–105	Donovan Mitchell (30)	Evan Mobley (8)	Donovan Mitchell (5)	Rocket Arena; 19,432	2–0
3	April 23	@ Toronto	L 104–126	James Harden (18)	Mobley, Strus (6)	Evan Mobley (7)	Scotiabank Arena; 19,800	2–1
4	April 26	@ Toronto	L 89–93	Donovan Mitchell (20)	Jarrett Allen (15)	James Harden (8)	Scotiabank Arena; 19,800	2–2
5	April 29	Toronto	W 125–120	Harden, Mobley (23)	Harden, Mobley (9)	James Harden (5)	Rocket Arena; 19,432	3–2
6	May 1	@ Toronto	L 110–112 (OT)	Evan Mobley (26)	Evan Mobley (14)	James Harden (9)	Scotiabank Arena; 19,919	3–3
7	May 3	Toronto	W 114–102	Allen, Mitchell (22)	Jarrett Allen (19)	Max Strus (5)	Rocket Arena; 19,432	4–3

Conference Semifinals: 4–3 (home: 2–1; road: 2–2)

Game	Date	Team	Score	High points	High rebounds	High assists	Location Attendance	Series
1	May 5	@ Detroit	L 101–111	Donovan Mitchell (23)	Evan Mobley (9)	James Harden (7)	Little Caesars Arena; 20,062	0–1
2	May 7	@ Detroit	L 97–107	Donovan Mitchell (31)	Jarrett Allen (7)	Dennis Schröder (5)	Little Caesars Arena; 20,062	0–2
3	May 9	Detroit	W 116–109	Donovan Mitchell (35)	Donovan Mitchell (10)	James Harden (7)	Rocket Arena; 19,432	1–2
4	May 11	Detroit	W 112–103	Donovan Mitchell (43)	Evan Mobley (8)	James Harden (11)	Rocket Arena; 19,432	2–2
5	May 13	@ Detroit	W 117–113 (OT)	James Harden (30)	Jarrett Allen (10)	Evan Mobley (8)	Little Caesars Arena; 20,062	3–2
6	May 15	Detroit	L 94–115	James Harden (23)	Allen, Strus (8)	James Harden (4)	Rocket Arena; 19,432	3–3
7	May 17	@ Detroit	W 125–94	Donovan Mitchell (26)	Evan Mobley (12)	Donovan Mitchell (8)	Little Caesars Arena; 20,062	4–3

Conference Finals: 0–4 (home: 0–2; road: 0–2)

Game	Date	Team	Score	High points	High rebounds	High assists	Location Attendance	Series
1	May 19	@ New York	L 104–115 (OT)	Donovan Mitchell (29)	Evan Mobley (14)	Dennis Schröder (5)	Madison Square Garden; 19,812	0–1
2	May 21	@ New York	L 93–109	Donovan Mitchell (26)	Jarrett Allen (10)	Tied (3)	Madison Square Garden; 19,812	0–2
3	May 23	New York	L 108–121	Evan Mobley (24)	Allen, Strus (7)	Max Strus (6)	Rocket Arena; 19,432	0–3
4	May 25	New York	L 93–130	Donovan Mitchell (31)	Evan Mobley (7)	Evan Mobley (4)	Rocket Arena; 19,432	0–4

2026 playoff schedule

=== NBA Cup ===
==== East Group A ====
Pos	Team	Pld	W	L	PF	PA	PD	Qualification
1	Toronto Raptors	4	4	0	458	403	+55	Advanced to knockout rounds
2	Atlanta Hawks	4	2	2	468	472	−4	
3	Cleveland Cavaliers	4	2	2	492	466	+26	
4	Indiana Pacers	4	1	3	431	431	0	
5	Washington Wizards	4	1	3	443	520	−77	

Source: NBA

== Player statistics ==
Legend
GP	Games played	GS	Games started	MPG	Minutes per game
FG%	Field-goal percentage	3P%	3-point field-goal percentage	FT%	Free-throw percentage
RPG	Rebounds per game	APG	Assists per game	SPG	Steals per game
BPG	Blocks per game	PPG	Points per game

=== Regular season ===
Cleveland Cavaliers statistics
Player	GP	GS	MPG	FG%	3P%	FT%	RPG	APG	SPG	BPG	PPG
Jarrett Allen	56	56	27.1	.638	.100	.709	8.5	1.8	1.0	.8	15.4
Lonzo Ball	35	3	20.8	.301	.272	.667	4.0	3.9	1.3	.3	4.6
Darius Brown	1	0	3.0	.000			1.0	.0	.0	.0	.0
Thomas Bryant	60	1	12.2	.506	.359	.803	3.4	.6	.3	.4	6.2
Keon Ellis^{†}	29	6	24.8	.491	.355	.816	2.8	1.6	1.3	.8	8.3
Tristan Enaruna	9	0	9.4	.500	.300	.750	1.6	.8	.6	.0	4.1
Darius Garland^{†}	26	26	30.5	.451	.360	.861	2.4	6.9	.8	.1	18.0
James Harden^{†}	26	26	33.8	.466	.435	.840	4.8	7.7	.8	.5	20.5
De'Andre Hunter^{†}	43	23	26.2	.423	.308	.869	4.2	2.1	.7	.1	14.0
Chris Livingston	3	0	5.7	.571	.000	1.000	1.0	.3	.3	.0	3.0
Sam Merrill	52	38	26.5	.461	.421	.855	2.6	2.4	.6	.1	12.8
Riley Minix^{†}	6	0	8.3	.588	.333	1.000	.7	.7	.2	.2	4.3
Donovan Mitchell	70	70	33.5	.483	.364	.865	4.5	5.7	1.5	.3	27.9
Evan Mobley	65	63	31.9	.546	.297	.606	9.0	3.6	.7	1.7	18.2
Larry Nance Jr.	35	3	12.8	.419	.333	.462	2.7	1.0	.6	.2	3.7
Craig Porter Jr.	64	3	17.9	.450	.355	.600	3.4	3.2	.9	.6	4.5
Tyrese Proctor	50	1	10.9	.413	.351	.889	1.3	1.5	.5	.0	5.4
Olivier Sarr	4	0	9.8	.714	.667	.400	2.8	1.3	.5	.8	3.5
Dennis Schröder^{†}	30	3	21.4	.401	.290	.861	2.3	4.3	.8	.2	8.2
Max Strus	12	5	24.0	.443	.402	.778	5.4	2.0	.3	.0	11.2
Nae'Qwan Tomlin	64	3	15.7	.478	.235	.770	2.9	.8	.6	.5	5.8
Luke Travers	12	0	8.6	.250	.063	1.000	2.0	.8	.6	.3	2.3
Jaylon Tyson	66	42	26.9	.493	.446	.738	5.1	2.2	.8	.4	13.2
Dean Wade	59	38	22.3	.439	.362	.711	4.2	1.5	.7	.4	5.8

=== Playoffs ===
Cleveland Cavaliers statistics
Player	GP	GS	MPG	FG%	3P%	FT%	RPG	APG	SPG	BPG	PPG
Jarrett Allen	18	18	29.4	.635		.579	7.2	1.1	1.0	1.7	12.7
Thomas Bryant	9	0	4.6	.286	.167	1.000	1.2	.2	.2	.1	1.9
Keon Ellis	12	0	7.4	.333	.357	.800	1.2	.3	.6	.1	1.6
James Harden	18	18	37.3	.410	.299	.831	5.1	5.5	1.7	.7	19.2
Sam Merrill	17	0	19.9	.427	.372	.840	1.2	1.1	.5	.0	7.8
Donovan Mitchell	18	18	36.2	.451	.327	.815	4.8	3.1	1.2	.3	26.0
Evan Mobley	18	18	35.6	.535	.338	.621	8.1	3.9	.9	1.8	17.0
Larry Nance Jr.	2	0	2.5				.0	.0	.0	.0	.0
Craig Porter Jr.	7	0	3.0	.333	.000		.4	.6	.0	.0	.3
Tyrese Proctor	4	0	3.3	.000	.000	1.000	.3	.5	.0	.0	.5
Dennis Schröder	17	0	15.9	.381	.333	.792	1.5	2.4	.4	.2	5.5
Max Strus	18	4	26.7	.406	.358	.917	4.8	2.1	.8	.2	9.6
Nae'Qwan Tomlin	7	0	2.7	.667		.500	.7	.3	.1	.0	1.3
Jaylon Tyson	17	0	12.7	.362	.237	.667	2.8	1.3	.2	.1	4.1
Dean Wade	18	14	22.6	.462	.375	.333	3.9	.8	.7	.1	4.4

- ^{†} Denotes player spent time with another team in the season. Stats reflect time with the Cavaliers only.

== Transactions ==
=== Trades ===
June 28, 2025
To Cleveland Cavaliers

Lonzo Ball
To Chicago Bulls

Isaac Okoro
February 1, 2026
To Cleveland Cavaliers

Keon Ellis (from Sacramento)
Emanuel Miller (from Chicago)
Dennis Schröder (from Sacramento)

To Chicago Bulls

Dario Šarić (from Sacramento)
2027 DEN second-round pick (from Cleveland)
2029 second-round pick (from Sacramento) (Note: The least favorable of the picks originally belonging to Detroit, Milwaukee, and New York.)

To Sacramento Kings

De'Andre Hunter (from Cleveland)

February 4, 2026
To Cleveland Cavaliers

James Harden
To Los Angeles Clippers

Darius Garland
2026 CLE second-round pick
February 5, 2026
To Cleveland Cavaliers

Cash considerations
To Utah Jazz

Lonzo Ball
2028 CLE second-round pick
2032 CLE second-round pick

=== Free agency ===
==== Re-signed ====
Date	Player	Ref.
June 28, 2025	Sam Merrill	
July 2, 2025	Luke Travers	

==== Additions ====
Date	Player	Former Team	Ref.
July 1, 2025	Larry Nance Jr.	Atlanta Hawks	

==== Subtractions ====
Date	Player	Reason	New Team	Ref.
June 30, 2025	Ty Jerome	Free agency	Memphis Grizzlies	
July 21, 2025	Chuma Okeke	Free agency	(Spain) Real Madrid Baloncesto	
