= Jaylon Tyson =

American basketball player (born 2002)

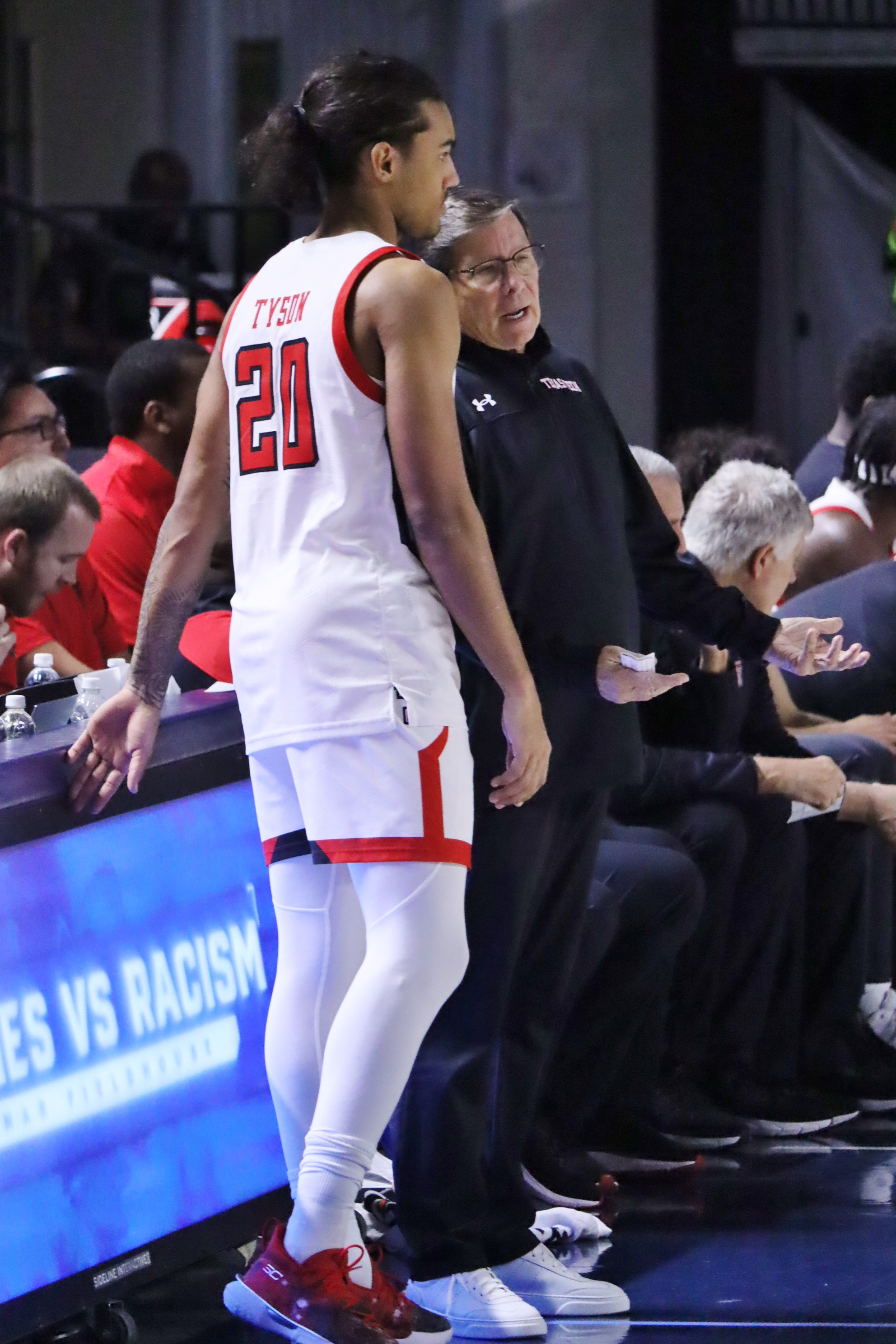
- Tyson (left) with Texas Tech in 2022

No. 20 – Cleveland Cavaliers
- Position: Small forward / shooting guard
- League: NBA

Personal information
- Born: December 2, 2002 (age 23) Allen, Texas, U.S.
- Listed height: 6 ft 6 in (1.98 m)
- Listed weight: 224 lb (102 kg)

Career information
- High school: John Paul II (Plano, Texas)
- College: Texas (2021–2022); Texas Tech (2022–2023); California (2023–2024)
- NBA draft: 2024: 1st round, 20th overall pick
- Drafted by: Cleveland Cavaliers
- Playing career: 2024–present

Career history
- 2024–present: Cleveland Cavaliers
- 2024–2025: →Cleveland Charge

Career highlights
- First-team All-Pac-12 (2024)
- Stats at NBA.com
- Stats at Basketball Reference

Jaylon La Rone Tyson (born December 2, 2002) is an American professional basketball player for the Cleveland Cavaliers of the National Basketball Association (NBA). He played college basketball for the Texas Longhorns, the Texas Tech Red Raiders and the California Golden Bears. He was drafted with the 20th overall pick in the 2024 NBA draft by the Cleveland Cavaliers.

== Early life and high school career ==
Tyson was born on December 2, 2002, and grew up in Allen, Texas. He attended John Paul II High School in Plano and helped the team win their first state championship in his junior year, during which he averaged 23.3 points, 5.8 rebounds and 2.1 assists per game.

Tyson then helped them reach the state semifinals with a 26–2 record as a senior, being named the district most valuable player and a first-team all-state selection while averaging 22.3 points, 4.7 rebounds, 4.1 assists and 2.1 steals per game. Ranked the 34th-best recruit in the 2021 class by Rivals, he committed to playing college basketball for Texas after having flipped from Texas Tech.

== College career ==
In his first year at Texas in the 2021–22 season, Tyson appeared in eight games, averaging 6.9 minutes and 1.8 points per game. He then entered the NCAA transfer portal.

Tyson ultimately committed to play for Texas Tech, whom he had previously committed to play for in high school before flipping to Texas.

Tyson started 31 games for Texas Tech in 2022–23, the third most on the team, and averaged 10.7 points and 6.1 rebounds per game. He ranked eighth in the Big 12 Conference in rebounds. He entered the transfer portal for a second time after the season, citing "racist" comments made by head coach Mark Adams, who was later suspended and resigned. Adams did not deny that racially insensitive comments were made, but did say the comments were linked to a Bible verse. Tyson eventually committed to the California Golden Bears.

In October 2023, the NCAA initially denied Tyson's eligibility waiver for being a two-time transfer, despite Tyson alleging discrimination, which the NCAA rules mentioned as valid criteria for an eligibility waiver. He eventually was granted eligibility on November 9 and entered the team's starting lineup.

== Professional career ==
On June 26, 2024, Tyson was selected with the 20th overall pick by the Cleveland Cavaliers in the 2024 NBA draft, and on July 3, he officially signed with the Cavs. Throughout his rookie season, was assigned several times to the Cleveland Charge. Tyson made 47 appearances (three starts) for Cleveland during the 2024–25 NBA season, averaging 3.6 points, 2.0 rebounds and 0.9 assists. On April 13, 2025, Tyson recorded a season-high 31 points, seven rebounds, four assists, and three steals in the Cavaliers' loss to the Indiana Pacers, 126–118.

On October 29, 2025, Tyson scored a season-high 19 points, grabbed five rebounds, and had three steals as the Cavaliers lost 105–125 to the Boston Celtics. On January 16, 2026, Tyson scored a career-high 39 points, including going 7-for-9 from behind the three-point line, as well as five rebounds and four assists during a 117–115 win over the Philadelphia 76ers. The performance included a game-winning assist to Evan Mobley in the final seconds. Tyson made 66 appearances (including 42 starts) for the Cavaliers during the 2025–26 NBA season, recording averages of 13.2 points, 5.1 rebounds, and 2.2 assists.

== Career statistics ==
Legend
GP	Games played	GS	Games started	MPG	Minutes per game
FG%	Field goal percentage	3P%	3-point field goal percentage	FT%	Free throw percentage
RPG	Rebounds per game	APG	Assists per game	SPG	Steals per game
BPG	Blocks per game	PPG	Points per game	**Bold**	Career high

=== NBA ===
==== Regular season ====
Year	Team	GP	GS	MPG	FG%	3P%	FT%	RPG	APG	SPG	BPG	PPG
2024–25	Cleveland	47	3	9.6	.430	.345	**.792**	2.0	.9	.3	.1	3.6
2025–26	Cleveland	**66**	**42**	**26.9**	**.493**	**.446**	.738	**5.1**	**2.2**	**.8**	**.4**	**13.2**
Career		113	45	19.7	.481	.430	.748	3.8	1.7	.6	.3	9.2

==== Playoffs ====
Year	Team	GP	GS	MPG	FG%	3P%	FT%	RPG	APG	SPG	BPG	PPG
2025	Cleveland	4	0	7.8	**.467**	**.556**	**.833**	1.8	**1.8**	**.5**	**.3**	**6.0**
2026	Cleveland	**17**	0	**12.7**	.362	.237	.667	**2.8**	1.3	.2	.1	4.1
Career		21	0	11.8	.381	.298	.714	2.6	1.4	.2	.1	4.4

=== College ===
Year	Team	GP	GS	MPG	FG%	3P%	FT%	RPG	APG	SPG	BPG	PPG
2021–22	Texas	8	0	6.9	.400	.000	.667	1.1	.4	.5	.3	1.8
2022–23	Texas Tech	**31**	**31**	28.9	**.483**	**.402**	.723	6.1	1.3	**1.4**	.4	10.7
2023–24	California	**31**	30	**34.3**	.465	.360	**.796**	**6.8**	**3.5**	1.2	**.5**	**19.6**
Career		70	61	28.7	.470	.372	.776	5.8	2.2	1.2	.4	13.6

== Personal life ==
Tyson’s older brother Berron played college football at South Alabama, where he now serves as a strength and conditioning coach, while his younger brother Jordyn currently plays wide receiver for the New Orleans Saints. His father John Tyson played football at Florida A&M.
