= 2024–25 Cleveland Cavaliers season =

2024–25 NBA season by team

- Division champions
- Head coach: Kenny Atkinson
- President: Koby Altman
- General manager: Mike Gansey
- Owner: Dan Gilbert
- Arena: Rocket Arena (Note: Formerly known as Rocket Mortgage FieldHouse until February 18, 2025)

Results
- Record: 64–18 (.780)
- Place: Division: 1st (Central); Conference: 1st (Eastern)
- Playoff finish: Conference semifinals (lost to Pacers 1–4)
- Stats at Basketball Reference

Local media
- Television: FanDuel Sports Network Ohio; WUAB & Rock Entertainment Sports Network (5 simulcasts)
- Radio: WTAM · WMMS

The 2024–25 Cleveland Cavaliers season was the 55th season for the franchise in the National Basketball Association (NBA). On May 23, 2024, the Cavaliers fired their head coach J. B. Bickerstaff after five seasons with the team. On June 28, 2024, the Cavaliers hired Kenny Atkinson as their new head coach. The Cavaliers began their regular season with a 15-game win streak; it became the 4th time in NBA history a team has started the regular season with a 15–0 record, joining the 1948–49 Washington Capitols, 1993–94 Houston Rockets, and 2015–16 Golden State Warriors as the only teams to start out either similarly or better than that. This also tied the record for longest winning streak in franchise history, as well as setting the longest winning streak in a head coach's first season with a new team. The Cavaliers clinched a playoff berth on March 5, following a 112–107 victory over the Miami Heat, and clinched the Central Division title on March 11 with a 109–104 win over the Brooklyn Nets. It marked the first time that the Cavaliers won a division title without LeBron James on their roster since 1976 in addition to being their first division title overall since 2018. The Cavaliers broke their record-tying franchise winning streak record from earlier in the season on March 14, with their 16th consecutive victory over the Memphis Grizzlies. On April 8, 2025, following a 135–113 win over the Chicago Bulls, the Cavaliers clinched the #1 seed in the East for the first time since 2016, and the first time without James on their roster.

In the first round of the playoffs, the Cavaliers matched up with the eighth-seeded Miami Heat; Cleveland swept the Heat in dominant fashion, moving on to face the Indiana Pacers in the second round, who would upset them in five games, ending their season in the second round for the second straight season. This included a Game 2 loss where the Cavaliers gave up a 20-point lead, and in Game 4 where they faced a 41-point deficit at halftime. Notably, for the season, Cleveland went 36-5 against every other opponent at home, with each loss being to a unique team, whilst the Pacers were 5-0 at Rocket Arena during the season.

The Cleveland Cavaliers drew an average home attendance of 19,433, the 7th-highest of all NBA teams.

== Draft ==
Round	Pick	Player	Position(s)	Nationality	College / club
1	20	Jaylon Tyson	SG	United States	California

The Cavaliers entered the draft (which was two days instead of one like it had been since the NBA draft was shortened down to two rounds back in 1989) with just one first-round pick. As part of a 2020 trade, their second-round pick was conveyed to the Indiana Pacers as the less favorable selection when the Cavaliers finished with a better 2023–24 season record than the Utah Jazz.

On the first night of the draft, with their only pick in the draft, the Cavaliers would select shooting guard Jaylon Tyson from the University of California.

== Roster ==
2024–25 Cleveland Cavaliers roster
Players

Pos.	No.	Player	Height	Weight	DOB	From
C	31	Jarrett Allen	6 ft 9 in (2.06 m)	243 lb (110 kg)	1998-04-21	Texas
F	21	Emoni Bates (TW)	6 ft 8 in (2.03 m)	170 lb (77 kg)	2004-01-28	Eastern Michigan
G	10	Darius Garland	6 ft 1 in (1.85 m)	192 lb (87 kg)	2000-01-26	Vanderbilt
F	8	Javonte Green	6 ft 5 in (1.96 m)	213 lb (97 kg)	1993-07-23	Radford
G/F	12	De'Andre Hunter	6 ft 8 in (2.03 m)	221 lb (100 kg)	1997-12-02	Virginia
G	2	Ty Jerome	6 ft 5 in (1.96 m)	195 lb (88 kg)	1997-07-08	Virginia
G	5	Sam Merrill	6 ft 4 in (1.93 m)	205 lb (93 kg)	1996-05-15	Utah State
G	45	Donovan Mitchell	6 ft 1 in (1.85 m)	215 lb (98 kg)	1996-09-07	Louisville
F/C	4	Evan Mobley	6 ft 11 in (2.11 m)	215 lb (98 kg)	2001-06-18	USC
F	18	Chuma Okeke	6 ft 7 in (2.01 m)	229 lb (104 kg)	1998-08-18	Auburn
G/F	35	Isaac Okoro	6 ft 5 in (1.96 m)	225 lb (102 kg)	2001-01-26	Auburn
G	9	Craig Porter Jr.	6 ft 1 in (1.85 m)	180 lb (82 kg)	2000-02-26	Wichita State
G/F	1	Max Strus	6 ft 5 in (1.96 m)	215 lb (98 kg)	1996-03-28	DePaul
C	13	Tristan Thompson	6 ft 9 in (2.06 m)	254 lb (115 kg)	1991-03-13	Texas
F	30	Nae'Qwan Tomlin (TW)	6 ft 10 in (2.08 m)	210 lb (95 kg)	2000-12-10	Memphis
G/F	33	Luke Travers (TW)	6 ft 7 in (2.01 m)	207 lb (94 kg)	2001-09-03	Australia
G/F	24	Jaylon Tyson	6 ft 6 in (1.98 m)	215 lb (98 kg)	2002-12-02	California
F	32	Dean Wade	6 ft 9 in (2.06 m)	228 lb (103 kg)	1996-11-20	Kansas State

Coaches
Head coach
- Kenny Atkinson
Assistant(s)
- Johnnie Bryant (associate HC)
- DeMarre Carroll
- Omar Cook
- Mike Gerrity
- Trevor Hendry
- Jordan Ott
- Nate Reinking
- Bryan Tibaldi

Legend
- (DP) Unsigned draft pick
- (FA) Free agent
- (S) Suspended
- (GL) On assignment to G League affiliate
- (TW) Two-way affiliate player
- (L) On personal leave
- Injured

Roster
Updated: April 3, 2025

== Standings ==
=== Division ===
Central Division	W	L	PCT	GB	Home	Road	Div	GP
c – Cleveland Cavaliers	64	18	.780	–	34‍–‍7	30‍–‍11	12‍–‍4	82
x – Indiana Pacers	50	32	.610	14.0	29‍–‍12	21‍–‍20	10‍–‍6	82
x – Milwaukee Bucks	48	34	.585	16.0	28‍–‍14	20‍–‍20	9‍–‍7	82
x – Detroit Pistons	44	38	.537	20.0	22‍–‍19	22‍–‍19	5‍–‍11	82
pi – Chicago Bulls	39	43	.476	25.0	18‍–‍23	21‍–‍20	4‍–‍12	82

=== Conference ===
Eastern Conference
#	Team	W	L	PCT	GB	GP
1	c – Cleveland Cavaliers *	64	18	.780	–	82
2	y – Boston Celtics *	61	21	.744	3.0	82
3	x – New York Knicks	51	31	.622	13.0	82
4	x – Indiana Pacers	50	32	.610	14.0	82
5	x – Milwaukee Bucks	48	34	.585	16.0	82
6	x – Detroit Pistons	44	38	.537	20.0	82
7	y – Orlando Magic *	41	41	.500	23.0	82
8	pi – Atlanta Hawks	40	42	.488	24.0	82
9	pi – Chicago Bulls	39	43	.476	25.0	82
10	x – Miami Heat	37	45	.451	27.0	82
11	Toronto Raptors	30	52	.366	34.0	82
12	Brooklyn Nets	26	56	.317	38.0	82
13	Philadelphia 76ers	24	58	.293	40.0	82
14	Charlotte Hornets	19	63	.232	45.0	82
15	Washington Wizards	18	64	.220	46.0	82

== Game log ==
=== Preseason ===
During the preseason, the Cavaliers would play their final games under what was previously named Bally Sports Ohio. Bally Sports would rebrand itself to the FanDuel Sports Network as of October 21, 2024, before the start of the regular season.

2024 preseason game log
Total: 0–4 (Home: 0–2; Road: 0–2)
Preseason: 0–4 (home: 0–2; road: 0–2)

Game	Date	Team	Score	High points	High rebounds	High assists	Location Attendance	Record
1	October 8	Chicago	L 112–116	Evan Mobley (19)	Jaylon Tyson (7)	Garland, Porter Jr. (5)	Rocket Mortgage FieldHouse	0–1
2	October 10	Indiana	L 117–129	Ty Jerome (15)	Allen, Travers, Tyson (6)	Ty Jerome (8)	Rocket Mortgage FieldHouse; 16,019	0–2
3	October 16	@ Detroit	L 92–108	Jarrett Allen (19)	Jarrett Allen (8)	Caris LeVert (6)	Little Caesars Arena; 8,411	0–3
4	October 18	@ Chicago	L 137–139 (OT)	Jarrett Allen (25)	Jarrett Allen (16)	Evan Mobley (8)	United Center; 18,704	0–4

2024–25 preseason schedule

=== Regular season ===
2024–25 game log
Total: 64–18 (Home: 34–7; Road: 30–11)
October: 5–0 (home: 2–0; road: 3–0)

Game	Date	Team	Score	High points	High rebounds	High assists	Location Attendance	Record
1	October 23	@ Toronto	W 136–106	Evan Mobley (25)	Mobley, Wade (8)	Garland, Jerome (6)	Scotiabank Arena; 19,800	1–0
2	October 25	Detroit	W 113–101	Mitchell, Wade (19)	Jarrett Allen (11)	Darius Garland (6)	Rocket Mortgage FieldHouse; 19,432	2–0
3	October 26	@ Washington	W 135–116	Donovan Mitchell (30)	Evan Mobley (13)	Garland, Mitchell (5)	Capital One Arena; 15,156	3–0
4	October 28	@ New York	W 110–104	Darius Garland (34)	Jarrett Allen (15)	Donovan Mitchell (5)	Madison Square Garden; 19,812	4–0
5	October 30	L.A. Lakers	W 134–110	Evan Mobley (25)	Jarrett Allen (17)	Darius Garland (10)	Rocket Mortgage FieldHouse; 19,432	5–0

November: 12–3 (home: 8–1; road: 4–2)

Game	Date	Team	Score	High points	High rebounds	High assists	Location Attendance	Record
6	November 1	Orlando	W 120–109	Darius Garland (25)	Evan Mobley (12)	Caris LeVert (7)	Rocket Mortgage FieldHouse; 19,432	6–0
7	November 2	@ Milwaukee	W 114–113	Donovan Mitchell (30)	Jarrett Allen (12)	Darius Garland (10)	Fiserv Forum; 17,341	7–0
8	November 4	Milwaukee	W 116–114	Darius Garland (39)	Jarrett Allen (15)	Darius Garland (8)	Rocket Mortgage FieldHouse; 19,432	8–0
9	November 6	@ New Orleans	W 131–122	Donovan Mitchell (29)	Jarrett Allen (14)	Darius Garland (9)	Smoothie King Center; 15,694	9–0
10	November 8	Golden State	W 136–117	Darius Garland (27)	Jarrett Allen (12)	Darius Garland (6)	Rocket Mortgage FieldHouse; 19,432	10–0
11	November 9	Brooklyn	W 105–100	Evan Mobley (23)	Evan Mobley (16)	Garland, LeVert (6)	Rocket Mortgage FieldHouse; 19,432	11–0
12	November 11	@ Chicago	W 119–113	Donovan Mitchell (36)	Evan Mobley (11)	Ty Jerome (6)	United Center; 20,560	12–0
13	November 13	@ Philadelphia	W 114–106	Darius Garland (25)	Donovan Mitchell (13)	Donovan Mitchell (9)	Wells Fargo Center; 19,777	13–0
14	November 15	Chicago	W 144–126	Donovan Mitchell (37)	Jarrett Allen (10)	Darius Garland (9)	Rocket Mortgage FieldHouse; 19,432	14–0
15	November 17	Charlotte	W 128–114	Darius Garland (25)	Jarrett Allen (15)	Darius Garland (12)	Rocket Mortgage FieldHouse; 19,432	15–0
16	November 19	@ Boston	L 117–120	Donovan Mitchell (35)	Allen, Mobley (11)	Darius Garland (7)	TD Garden; 19,156	15–1
17	November 20	New Orleans	W 128–100	Ty Jerome (29)	Allen, Tyson (11)	Porter Jr., Tyson (7)	Rocket Mortgage FieldHouse; 19,432	16–1
18	November 24	Toronto	W 122–108	Jerome, Mitchell (26)	Jarrett Allen (13)	Garland, Jerome (6)	Rocket Mortgage FieldHouse; 19,432	17–1
19	November 27	Atlanta	L 124–135	Donovan Mitchell (30)	Evan Mobley (12)	Garland, Mitchell (7)	Rocket Mortgage FieldHouse; 19,432	17–2
20	November 29	@ Atlanta	L 101–117	Darius Garland (29)	Evan Mobley (12)	Donovan Mitchell (6)	State Farm Arena; 17,881	17–3

December: 12–1 (home: 7–0; road: 5–1)

Game	Date	Team	Score	High points	High rebounds	High assists	Location Attendance	Record
21	December 1	Boston	W 115–111	Donovan Mitchell (35)	Allen, Mobley (10)	Darius Garland (8)	Rocket Mortgage FieldHouse; 19,432	18–3
22	December 3	Washington	W 118–87	Mitchell, Mobley (19)	Evan Mobley (10)	Donovan Mitchell (7)	Rocket Mortgage FieldHouse; 19,432	19–3
23	December 5	Denver	W 126–114	Donovan Mitchell (28)	Jarrett Allen (15)	Allen, LeVert, Mitchell (6)	Rocket Mortgage FieldHouse; 19,432	20–3
24	December 7	@ Charlotte	W 116–102	Evan Mobley (41)	Allen, Mobley (10)	Donovan Mitchell (8)	Spectrum Center; 18,832	21–3
25	December 8	@ Miami	L 113–122	Darius Garland (23)	Dean Wade (8)	Ty Jerome (6)	Kaseya Center; 19,600	21–4
26	December 13	Washington	W 115–105	Darius Garland (24)	Jarrett Allen (11)	Darius Garland (8)	Rocket Mortgage FieldHouse; 19,432	22–4
27	December 16	@ Brooklyn	W 130–101	Evan Mobley (21)	Georges Niang (9)	Garland, Jerome (6)	Barclays Center; 16,588	23–4
28	December 20	Milwaukee	W 124–101	Donovan Mitchell (27)	Jarrett Allen (10)	Donovan Mitchell (6)	Rocket Mortgage FieldHouse; 19,432	24–4
29	December 21	Philadelphia	W 126–99	Darius Garland (26)	Evan Mobley (13)	Evan Mobley (7)	Rocket Mortgage FieldHouse; 19,432	25–4
30	December 23	Utah	W 124–113	Darius Garland (23)	Evan Mobley (10)	Darius Garland (8)	Rocket Mortgage FieldHouse; 19,432	26–4
31	December 27	@ Denver	W 149–135	Donovan Mitchell (33)	Jarrett Allen (10)	Darius Garland (7)	Ball Arena; 19,952	27–4
32	December 30	@ Golden State	W 113–95	Darius Garland (25)	Dean Wade (13)	Darius Garland (8)	Chase Center; 18,064	28–4
33	December 31	@ L.A. Lakers	W 122–110	Jarrett Allen (27)	Jarrett Allen (14)	Darius Garland (14)	Crypto.com Arena; 18,997	29–4

January: 10–5 (home: 6–2; road: 4–3)

Game	Date	Team	Score	High points	High rebounds	High assists	Location Attendance	Record
34	January 3	@ Dallas	W 134–122	Evan Mobley (34)	Evan Mobley (10)	Darius Garland (9)	American Airlines Center; 20,231	30–4
35	January 5	Charlotte	W 115–105	Darius Garland (25)	Jarrett Allen (11)	Caris LeVert (6)	Rocket Mortgage FieldHouse; 19,432	31–4
36	January 8	Oklahoma City	W 129–122	Jarrett Allen (25)	Jarrett Allen (11)	Garland, Mobley (7)	Rocket Mortgage FieldHouse; 19,432	32–4
37	January 9	Toronto	W 132–126	Darius Garland (40)	Jarrett Allen (15)	Darius Garland (9)	Rocket Mortgage FieldHouse; 19,432	33–4
38	January 12	Indiana	L 93–108	Darius Garland (20)	Evan Mobley (12)	Darius Garland (7)	Rocket Mortgage FieldHouse; 19,432	33–5
39	January 14	@ Indiana	W 127–117	Donovan Mitchell (35)	Evan Mobley (13)	Garland, LeVert (7)	Gainbridge Fieldhouse; 16,035	34–5
40	January 16	@ Oklahoma City	L 114–134	Darius Garland (20)	Allen, Thompson (7)	Darius Garland (9)	Paycom Center; 18,203	34–6
41	January 18	@ Minnesota	W 124–117	Donovan Mitchell (36)	Georges Niang (10)	Donovan Mitchell (7)	Target Center; 18,978	35–6
42	January 20	Phoenix	W 118–92	Donovan Mitchell (33)	Jarrett Allen (11)	Darius Garland (7)	Rocket Mortgage FieldHouse; 19,432	36–6
43	January 22	@ Houston	L 108–109	Darius Garland (26)	Jarrett Allen (13)	Garland, Strus (5)	Toyota Center; 16,719	36–7
44	January 24	@ Philadelphia	L 129–132	Donovan Mitchell (37)	Jarrett Allen (10)	Garland, Mitchell (7)	Wells Fargo Center; 19,760	36–8
45	January 25	Houston	L 131–135	Darius Garland (39)	Max Strus (9)	Darius Garland (9)	Rocket Mortgage FieldHouse; 19,432	36–9
46	January 27	Detroit	W 110–91	Darius Garland (22)	Evan Mobley (14)	Darius Garland (7)	Rocket Mortgage FieldHouse; 19,432	37–9
47	January 29	@ Miami	W 126–106	Donovan Mitchell (34)	Evan Mobley (15)	Ty Jerome (7)	Kaseya Center; 19,600	38–9
48	January 30	Atlanta	W 137–115	Darius Garland (26)	Jarrett Allen (15)	Darius Garland (7)	Rocket Mortgage FieldHouse; 19,432	39–9

February: 10–1 (home: 4–1; road: 6–0)

Game	Date	Team	Score	High points	High rebounds	High assists	Location Attendance	Record
49	February 2	Dallas	W 144–101	Sam Merrill (27)	Evan Mobley (11)	Darius Garland (10)	Rocket Mortgage FieldHouse; 19,432	40–9
50	February 4	Boston	L 105–112	Donovan Mitchell (31)	Jarrett Allen (18)	Donovan Mitchell (6)	Rocket Mortgage FieldHouse; 19,432	40–10
51	February 5	@ Detroit	W 118–115	Evan Mobley (30)	Jarrett Allen (13)	Evan Mobley (7)	Little Caesars Arena; 18,734	41–10
52	February 7	@ Washington	W 134–124	Donovan Mitchell (33)	Jarrett Allen (12)	Garland, Mitchell, Porter Jr. (5)	Capital One Arena; 20,385	42–10
53	February 10	Minnesota	W 128–107	Evan Mobley (28)	Jarrett Allen (13)	Donovan Mitchell (8)	Rocket Mortgage FieldHouse; 19,432	43–10
54	February 12	@ Toronto	W 131–108	Donovan Mitchell (21)	Evan Mobley (15)	Darius Garland (8)	Scotiabank Arena; 16,549	44–10
All-Star Break
55	February 20	@ Brooklyn	W 110–97	Donovan Mitchell (26)	Jarrett Allen (20)	Darius Garland (9)	Barclays Center; 17,926	45–10
56	February 21	New York	W 142–105	Donovan Mitchell (27)	Evan Mobley (8)	Max Strus (8)	Rocket Arena; 19,432	46–10
57	February 23	Memphis	W 129–123	Donovan Mitchell (33)	Evan Mobley (13)	Evan Mobley (8)	Rocket Arena; 19,432	47–10
58	February 25	@ Orlando	W 122–82	Ty Jerome (20)	Evan Mobley (8)	Mitchell, Porter Jr. (5)	Kia Center; 18,846	48–10
59	February 28	@ Boston	W 123–116	Donovan Mitchell (41)	Evan Mobley (12)	Darius Garland (7)	TD Garden; 19,156	49–10

March: 11–5 (home: 5–1; road: 6–4)

Game	Date	Team	Score	High points	High rebounds	High assists	Location Attendance	Record
60	March 2	Portland	W 133–129 (OT)	De'Andre Hunter (32)	Jarrett Allen (10)	Darius Garland (7)	Rocket Arena; 19,432	50–10
61	March 4	@ Chicago	W 139–117	Donovan Mitchell (28)	Jarrett Allen (17)	Darius Garland (7)	United Center; 20,943	51–10
62	March 5	Miami	W 112–107	Donovan Mitchell (26)	Evan Mobley (13)	Darius Garland (10)	Rocket Arena; 19,432	52–10
63	March 7	@ Charlotte	W 118–117	Donovan Mitchell (24)	Jarrett Allen (11)	Hunter, Mobley (4)	Spectrum Center; 19,296	53–10
64	March 9	@ Milwaukee	W 112–100	Max Strus (17)	Max Strus (9)	Donovan Mitchell (6)	Fiserv Forum; 17,355	54–10
65	March 11	Brooklyn	W 109–104	Darius Garland (30)	Jarrett Allen (13)	Darius Garland (8)	Rocket Arena; 19,432	55–10
66	March 14	@ Memphis	W 133–124	Evan Mobley (22)	Evan Mobley (11)	Darius Garland (9)	FedExForum; 17,051	56–10
67	March 16	Orlando	L 103–108	Donovan Mitchell (23)	Jarrett Allen (12)	Mitchell, Strus (5)	Rocket Arena; 19,432	56–11
68	March 18	@ L.A. Clippers	L 119–132	Max Strus (24)	Jarrett Allen (8)	Donovan Mitchell (11)	Intuit Dome; 17,927	56–12
69	March 19	@ Sacramento	L 119–123	Evan Mobley (31)	Evan Mobley (10)	Ty Jerome (6)	Golden 1 Center; 15,919	56–13
70	March 21	@ Phoenix	L 112–123	Darius Garland (18)	Evan Mobley (12)	Darius Garland (6)	PHX Arena; 17,071	56–14
71	March 23	@ Utah	W 120–91	Jarrett Allen (18)	Evan Mobley (11)	Sam Merrill (5)	Delta Center; 18,175	57–14
72	March 25	@ Portland	W 122–111	Darius Garland (27)	Evan Mobley (12)	Darius Garland (8)	Moda Center; 19,335	58–14
73	March 27	San Antonio	W 124–116	Jarrett Allen (29)	Jarrett Allen (15)	Donovan Mitchell (14)	Rocket Arena; 19,432	59–14
74	March 28	@ Detroit	L 122–133	Donovan Mitchell (38)	Evan Mobley (6)	Darius Garland (6)	Little Caesars Arena; 20,062	59–15
75	March 30	L.A. Clippers	W 127–122	Jarrett Allen (25)	Allen, Mitchell (12)	Garland, Mitchell (7)	Rocket Arena; 19,432	60–15

April: 4–3 (home: 2–2; road: 2–1)

Game	Date	Team	Score	High points	High rebounds	High assists	Location Attendance	Record
76	April 2	New York	W 124–105	Donovan Mitchell (27)	Jarrett Allen (8)	Darius Garland (6)	Rocket Arena; 19,432	61–15
77	April 4	@ San Antonio	W 114–113	Donovan Mitchell (26)	Evan Mobley (12)	Garland, Mitchell (7)	Frost Bank Center; 17,819	62–15
78	April 6	Sacramento	L 113–120	Ty Jerome (20)	Evan Mobley (9)	Garland, Strus (7)	Rocket Arena; 19,432	62–16
79	April 8	Chicago	W 135–113	Darius Garland (28)	Evan Mobley (12)	Evan Mobley (7)	Rocket Arena; 19,432	63–16
80	April 10	@ Indiana	L 112–114	Ty Jerome (24)	Tristan Thompson (12)	Ty Jerome (6)	Gainbridge Fieldhouse; 17,020	63–17
81	April 11	@ New York	W 108–102	Darius Garland (26)	Jarrett Allen (13)	Darius Garland (13)	Madison Square Garden; 19,812	64–17
82	April 13	Indiana	L 118–126 (2OT)	Jaylon Tyson (31)	Tristan Thompson (20)	Craig Porter Jr. (5)	Rocket Arena; 19,432	64–18

2024–25 season schedule

=== Playoffs ===
2025 playoff game log
Total: 5–4 (home: 2–3; road: 3–1)
First Round: 4–0 (home: 2–0; road: 2–0)

Game	Date	Team	Score	High points	High rebounds	High assists	Location Attendance	Series
1	April 20	Miami	W 121–100	Donovan Mitchell (30)	Jarrett Allen (11)	Darius Garland (5)	Rocket Arena; 19,432	1–0
2	April 23	Miami	W 121–112	Donovan Mitchell (30)	Jarrett Allen (11)	Darius Garland (9)	Rocket Arena; 19,432	2–0
3	April 26	@ Miami	W 124–87	Jarrett Allen (22)	Jarrett Allen (10)	Ty Jerome (11)	Kaseya Center; 19,600	3–0
4	April 28	@ Miami	W 138–83	Donovan Mitchell (22)	Jarrett Allen (12)	Jerome, Mitchell (5)	Kaseya Center; 19,600	4–0

Conference Semifinals: 1–4 (home: 0–3; road: 1–1)

Game	Date	Team	Score	High points	High rebounds	High assists	Location Attendance	Series
1	May 4	Indiana	L 112–121	Donovan Mitchell (33)	Evan Mobley (10)	Ty Jerome (8)	Rocket Arena; 19,432	0–1
2	May 6	Indiana	L 119–120	Donovan Mitchell (48)	Jarrett Allen (12)	Donovan Mitchell (9)	Rocket Arena; 19,432	0–2
3	May 9	@ Indiana	W 126–104	Donovan Mitchell (43)	Evan Mobley (13)	Max Strus (7)	Gainbridge Fieldhouse; 17,274	1–2
4	May 11	@ Indiana	L 109–129	Darius Garland (21)	Strus, Thompson (6)	Darius Garland (6)	Gainbridge Fieldhouse; 17,274	1–3
5	May 13	Indiana	L 105–114	Donovan Mitchell (35)	Evan Mobley (11)	Darius Garland (3)	Rocket Arena; 19,432	1–4

2025 playoff schedule

=== NBA Cup ===
The groups were revealed during the tournament announcement on July 12, 2024.

==== East Group C ====
Pos	Team	Pld	W	L	PF	PA	PD	Qualification
1	Atlanta Hawks	4	3	1	485	470	+15	Advance to knockout stage
2	Boston Celtics	4	3	1	482	459	+23	
3	Cleveland Cavaliers	4	2	2	480	450	+30	
4	Chicago Bulls	4	2	2	518	512	+6	
5	Washington Wizards	4	0	4	408	482	−74	

Source: NBA
Rules for classification: Tiebreakers

== Player statistics ==
Legend
GP	Games played	GS	Games started	MPG	Minutes per game
FG%	Field-goal percentage	3P%	3-point field-goal percentage	FT%	Free-throw percentage
RPG	Rebounds per game	APG	Assists per game	SPG	Steals per game
BPG	Blocks per game	PPG	Points per game

=== Regular season ===
Cleveland Cavaliers statistics
Player	GP	GS	MPG	FG%	3P%	FT%	RPG	APG	SPG	BPG	PPG
Jarrett Allen	82	82	28.0	.706	.000	.718	9.7	1.9	.9	.9	13.5
Emoni Bates	10	0	7.5	.342	.367		.7	.8	.1	.1	3.7
Darius Garland	75	75	30.7	.472	.401	.878	2.9	6.7	1.2	.1	20.6
Javonte Green^{†}	18	1	9.2	.365	.242	.500	2.2	.6	.6	.1	3.3
De'Andre Hunter^{†}	27	5	25.1	.485	.426	.821	4.2	1.3	.7	.3	14.3
Ty Jerome	70	3	19.9	.516	.439	.872	2.5	3.4	1.1	.0	12.5
Caris LeVert^{†}	38	3	23.8	.453	.405	.699	2.8	3.7	.9	.5	10.2
Sam Merrill	71	4	19.7	.406	.372	.966	2.2	1.5	.7	.2	7.2
Donovan Mitchell	71	71	31.4	.443	.368	.823	4.5	5.0	1.3	.2	24.0
Evan Mobley	71	71	30.5	.557	.370	.725	9.3	3.2	.9	1.6	18.5
Georges Niang^{†}	51	1	20.7	.449	.376	.850	3.7	1.3	.3	.1	8.7
Chuma Okeke^{†}	2	0	12.7	.286	.167		2.0	1.0	.0	.5	2.5
Isaac Okoro	55	22	19.1	.464	.371	.717	2.4	1.2	.6	.3	6.1
Craig Porter Jr.	51	1	10.1	.514	.438	.719	1.3	1.4	.3	.3	3.7
Max Strus	50	37	25.5	.442	.386	.824	4.3	3.2	.5	.2	9.4
Tristan Thompson	40	0	8.2	.437	.000	.233	3.4	.6	.1	.3	1.7
JT Thor^{†}	9	0	4.7	.600	.500	.875	.7	.1	.2	.3	3.1
Nae'Qwan Tomlin	5	1	12.7	.406	.200	.727	4.2	.4	.0	.2	7.2
Luke Travers	12	0	7.3	.250	.000	1.000	1.7	.7	.1	.1	1.0
Jaylon Tyson	47	3	9.6	.430	.345	.792	2.0	.9	.3	.1	3.6
Dean Wade	59	30	21.2	.413	.360	.533	4.2	1.3	.7	.3	5.4

=== Playoffs ===
Cleveland Cavaliers statistics
Player	GP	GS	MPG	FG%	3P%	FT%	RPG	APG	SPG	BPG	PPG
Jarrett Allen	9	9	29.0	.721		.943	8.4	1.3	1.4	.9	13.4
Darius Garland	5	5	29.6	.420	.286	.917	2.2	5.2	.4	.0	18.0
Javonte Green	6	0	6.6	.400	.200	1.000	1.5	.3	.7	.0	2.5
De'Andre Hunter	8	0	23.2	.429	.462	.846	3.6	1.0	.5	.1	11.0
Ty Jerome	9	1	21.3	.402	.389	.850	2.4	3.6	.6	.1	11.7
Sam Merrill	8	3	19.9	.375	.359	.667	2.5	1.8	.5	.3	5.8
Donovan Mitchell	9	9	32.0	.443	.333	.742	4.7	3.9	1.9	.3	29.6
Evan Mobley	8	8	32.1	.586	.452	.840	8.1	1.6	1.1	1.0	17.1
Chuma Okeke	3	0	4.3	.250	.250		.0	.3	.3	.0	1.0
Isaac Okoro	9	0	14.2	.500	.375	.625	1.2	.6	.7	.1	4.6
Craig Porter Jr.	6	0	5.9	.500	.000		1.0	1.5	.5	.3	2.0
Max Strus	9	9	28.1	.416	.388	.833	5.7	3.9	.7	.2	11.7
Tristan Thompson	3	0	9.8	.500		.333	5.0	.3	.3	.7	2.3
Jaylon Tyson	4	0	7.7	.467	.556	.833	1.8	1.8	.5	.3	6.0
Dean Wade	9	1	15.7	.333	.214		4.2	.7	.3	.1	1.7

- ^{†} Denotes player spent time with another team in the season. Stats reflect time with the Cavaliers only.

== Transactions ==
=== Trades ===
February 6, 2025	To Cleveland Cavaliers De'Andre Hunter	To Atlanta Hawks Caris LeVert; Georges Niang; 2026 right to swap first-round picks (Note: San Antonio has the right to swap with Atlanta; the Cleveland could end up with their own pick, Minnesota's pick, or Utah's pick. After all the other swap rights are exercised or decline, the Hawks will be able to swap the pick they have for the pick the Cavaliers have.); 2027 CLE second-round pick 2028 right to swap first-round picks (Note: Atlanta will be able to swap its own pick for the less favorable of the picks originally belonging to Cleveland and Utah.); 2029 CLE second-round pick 2031 CLE second-round pick

=== Free agency ===
==== Re-signed ====
Date	Player	Ref.
July 7, 2024	Donovan Mitchell	
July 22, 2024	Evan Mobley	
August 2, 2024	Jarrett Allen	
September 9, 2024	Tristan Thompson	
September 17, 2024	Isaac Okoro	

==== Additions ====
Date	Player	Former team	Ref.
June 28, 2024	Darius Brown	Utah State Aggies (NCAA)	
August 28, 2024	Luke Travers	Melbourne United	
September 9, 2024	JT Thor	Charlotte Hornets	

==== Subtractions ====
Date	Player	Reason left	New team	Ref.
August 5, 2024	Damian Jones	Free agency	Zhejiang Golden Bulls	
September 16, 2024	Marcus Morris Sr.	Free agency	New York Knicks	
September 30, 2024	Isaiah Mobley	Free agency	Philadelphia 76ers	
