= Nae'Qwan Tomlin =

American basketball player (born 2000)

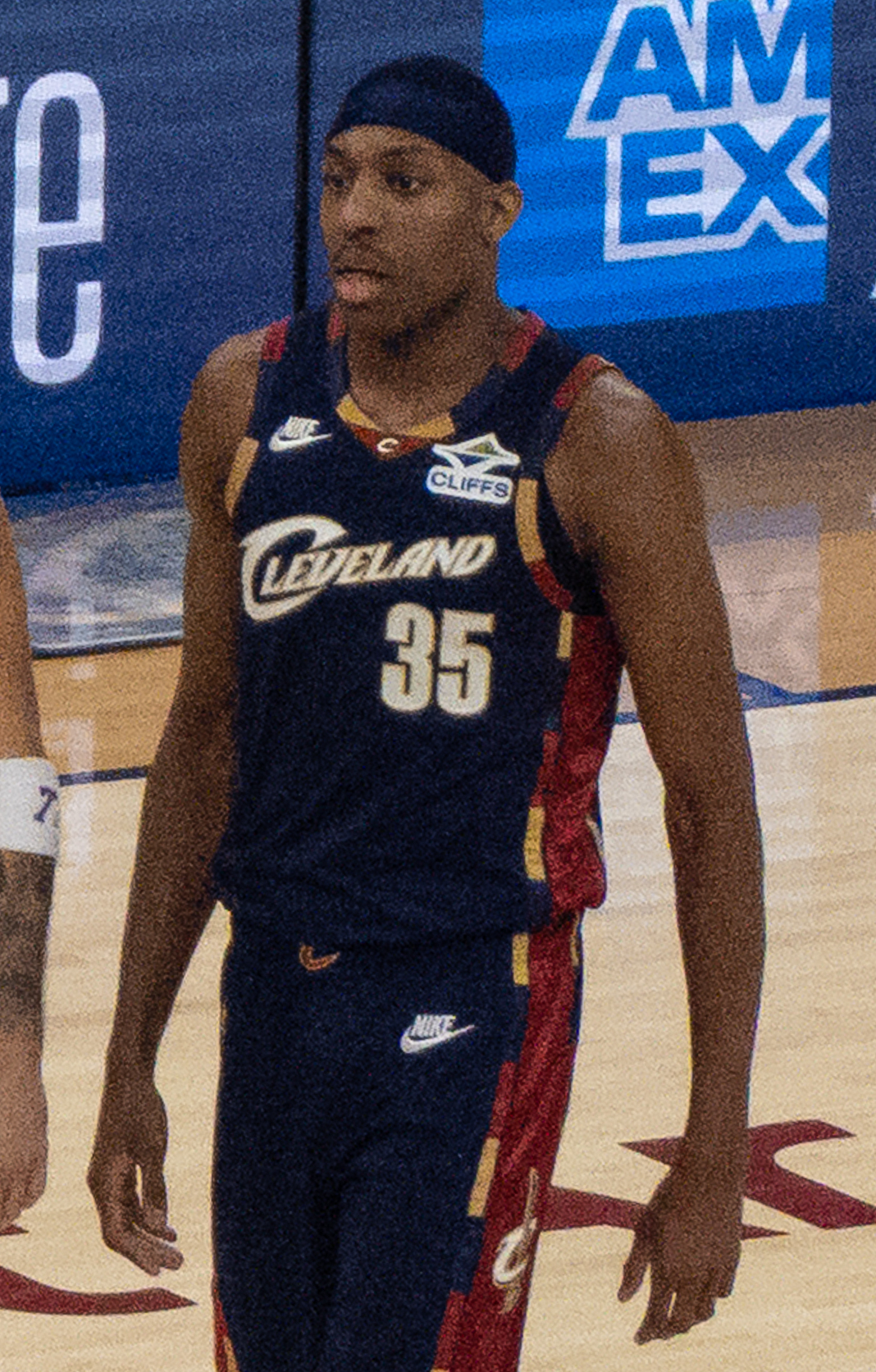
- Tomlin with the Cleveland Cavaliers in 2026

No. 35 – Cleveland Cavaliers
- Position: Power forward
- League: NBA

Personal information
- Born: December 19, 2000 (age 25) Brooklyn, New York, U.S.
- Listed height: 6 ft 8 in (2.03 m)
- Listed weight: 210 lb (95 kg)

Career information
- High school: Urban Assembly (New York City, New York)
- College: Monroe CC (2019–2020); Chipola College (2020–2022); Kansas State (2022–2023); Memphis (2023–2024)
- NBA draft: 2024: undrafted
- Playing career: 2024–present

Career history
- 2024–2025: Cleveland Charge
- 2025–present: Cleveland Cavaliers
- 2025–2026: →Cleveland Charge
- Stats at NBA.com
- Stats at Basketball Reference

Nae'Qwan Tomlin (born December 19, 2000) is an American professional basketball player for the Cleveland Cavaliers of the National Basketball Association (NBA). He played college basketball for the Monroe CC Tribunes, Chipola Indians, Kansas State Wildcats and the Memphis Tigers.

== Early life ==
Tomlin was born in Brooklyn, New York. He moved to Harlem with his mother, Aisha Ismael, when he was aged 10. Tomlin became a fan of basketball through his mother who watched games on television.

Tomlin attended Urban Assembly High School in New York City. He did not take his academics seriously and poor grades prevented him from making the basketball team during his only attempt as a senior.

Tomlin played at Rucker Park where he played in a prep league and was noticed by Torrell Harris, the father of basketball player Tobias Harris. Harris sent Tomlin to San Antonio so he could attend Strength N Motion International, a prep school led by George Gervin. Tomlin learned fundamental basketball skills and guidance from Gervin. Harris then helped Tomlin to enroll at Monroe Community College in New York.

== College career ==
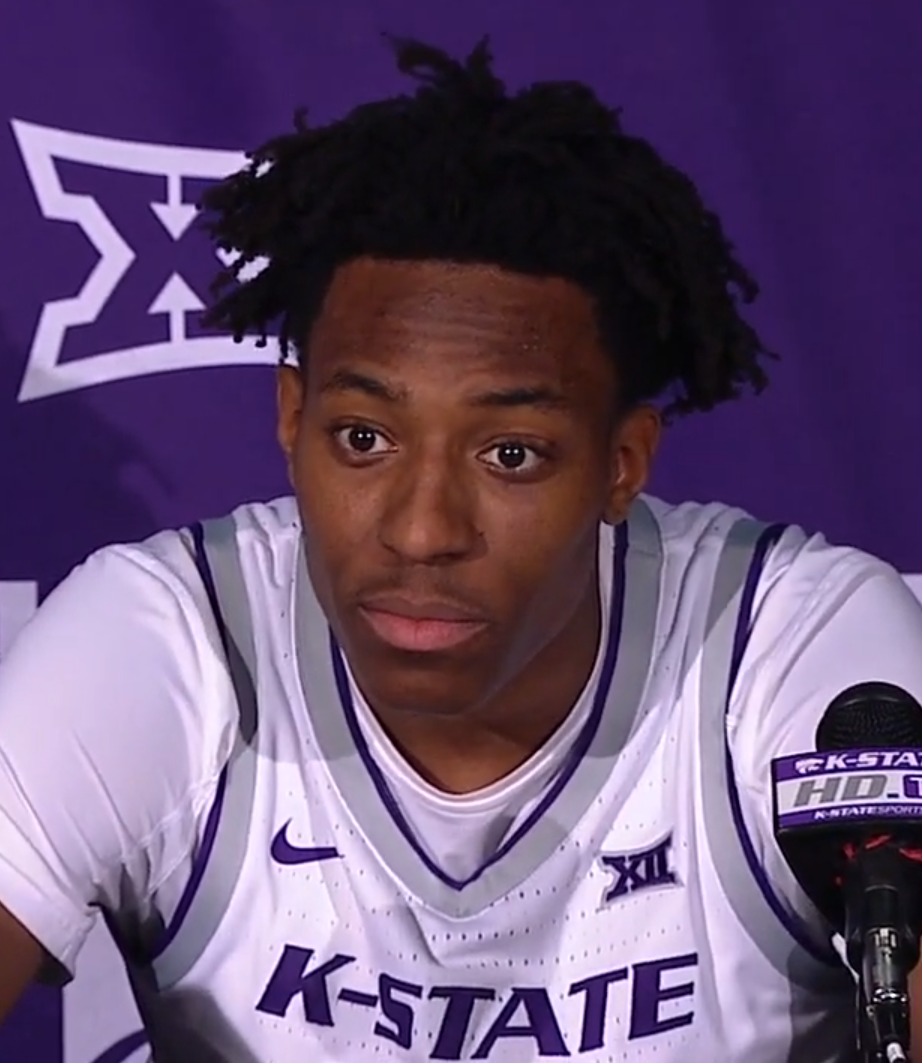
Tomlin with the Kansas State Wildcats in 2022

Tomlin played for the Monroe CC Tribunes during the 2019–20 season for what was his first stint of organized basketball. He averaged 13.3 points, 8.8 rebounds and 3.3 blocks per game. Tomlin then played for the Chipola Indians from 2020 to 2022 and led the team to a combined 53–11 record.

Afterwards, Tomlin transferred to the Kansas State Wildcats, helping the team advance to the Elite Eight in 2023. On December 6, 2023, Tomlin was dismissed from Kansas State after being suspended indefinitely following an arrest for disorderly conduct. In his final season, he transferred mid-season to the Memphis Tigers, playing 21 games and averaging 14 points and 6 rebounds, the latter the second most on the team.

== Professional career ==
After going undrafted in the 2024 NBA draft, Tomlin joined the Cleveland Cavaliers for the 2024 NBA Summer League. On September 24, 2024, he signed with the Cavaliers but was waived that same day. On October 26, he joined the Cleveland Charge of the NBA G League.

On February 20, 2025, Tomlin signed with the Cavaliers on a 10-day contract. On March 2, the Cavaliers signed him to a two-way contract.

On February 10, 2026, the Cleveland Cavaliers converted forward Tomlin from a two-way deal to a two-year, $3 million fully guaranteed standard NBA contract.

== Career statistics ==
Legend
GP	Games played	GS	Games started	MPG	Minutes per game
FG%	Field goal percentage	3P%	3-point field goal percentage	FT%	Free throw percentage
RPG	Rebounds per game	APG	Assists per game	SPG	Steals per game
BPG	Blocks per game	PPG	Points per game	**Bold**	Career high

=== NBA ===
==== Regular season ====
Year	Team	GP	GS	MPG	FG%	3P%	FT%	RPG	APG	SPG	BPG	PPG
2024–25	Cleveland	5	1	12.6	.406	.200	.438	**4.2**	.4	.0	.2	**7.2**
2025–26	Cleveland	**64**	**3**	**15.7**	**.478**	**.235**	**.770**	2.9	**.8**	**.6**	**.5**	5.8
Career		69	4	15.5	.471	.232	.764	3.0	.8	.6	.5	5.9

==== Playoffs ====
Year	Team	GP	GS	MPG	FG%	3P%	FT%	RPG	APG	SPG	BPG	PPG
2026	Cleveland	7	0	2.7	.667	—	.500	.7	.3	.1	.0	1.3
Career		7	0	2.7	.667	—	.500	.7	.3	.1	.0	1.3

=== College ===
Year	Team	GP	GS	MPG	FG%	3P%	FT%	RPG	APG	SPG	BPG	PPG
2022–23	Kansas State	**36**	**36**	**27.3**	.500	.275	.738	5.9	**1.2**	**1.2**	1.0	10.4
2023–24	Memphis	21	11	26.9	**.601**	**.396**	**.774**	**6.0**	.7	.8	**1.1**	**14.0**
Career		57	47	27.1	.539	.328	.753	5.9	1.0	1.0	1.0	11.8

== Personal life ==
Tomlin is the son of Aisha Ishmael and has two siblings. He majored in social transformation studies.
