= John Paul II High School (Plano, Texas) =

Catholic school in Plano, Texas

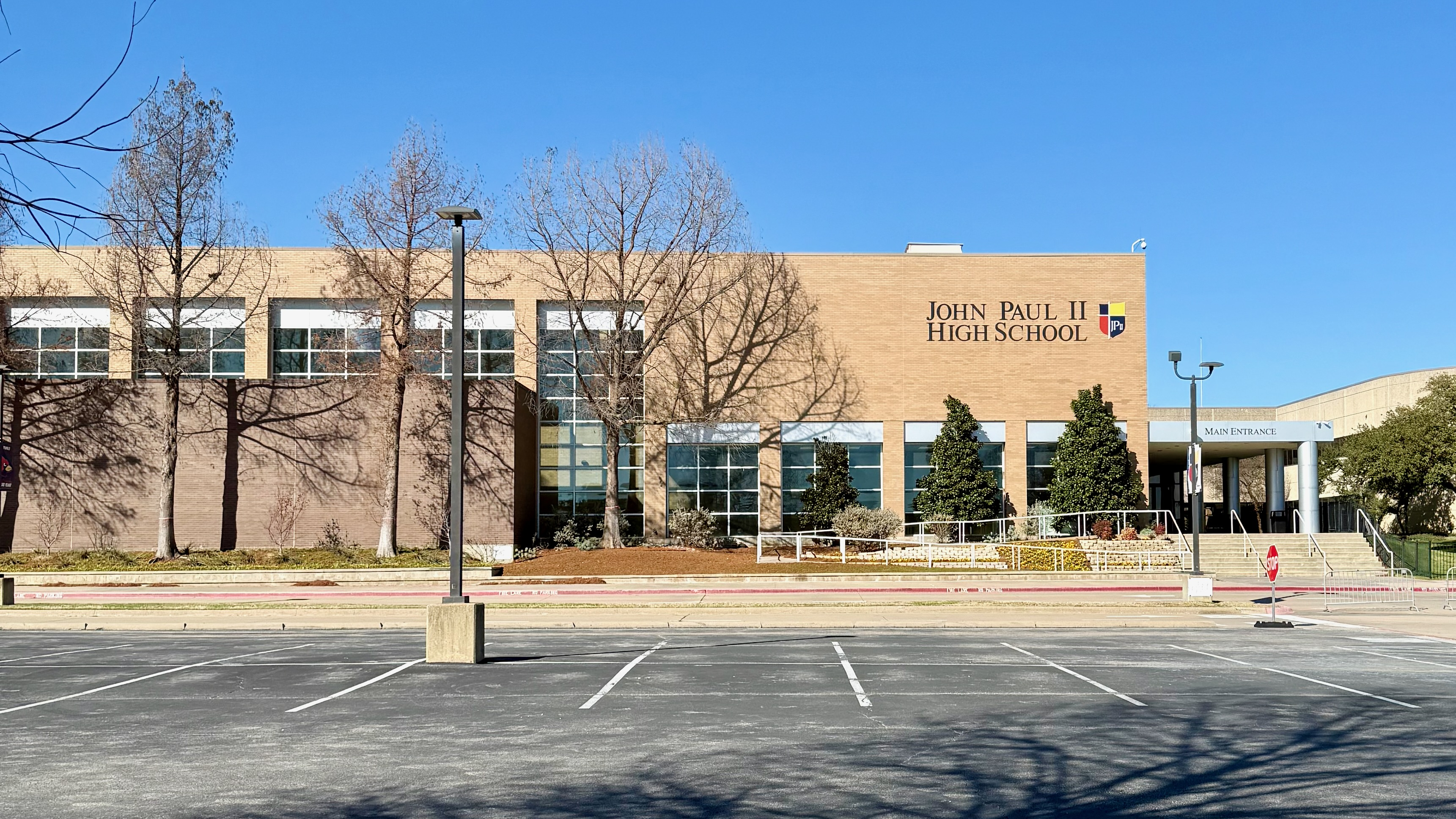

Location
- 900 Coit Road; Plano, (Collin County), Texas 75075; 33°0′45″N 96°45′51″W

Information
- Type: Private college preparatory, Coeducational
- Motto: "Seek to serve"
- Religious affiliation: Roman Catholic
- Opened: 2005
- President: Ms. Casey Buckstaff, M.B.A.
- Grades: 9–12
- Enrollment: 690 (2025-26)
- Colors: Red and Blue and Yellow
- Team name: Cardinals
- Accreditation: Southern Association of Colleges and Schools
- Yearbook: The Cardinal
- Tuition: $25,300 (2025-26)
- Principal: Dr. Daniel Ledbetter
- Executive Director of Admissions and College Counseling: Mickey Saloma, M.B.A.
- Athletic Director: George Teague
- Website: johnpauliihs.org

John Paul II High School, a private Catholic preparatory institution, is located in Plano, Texas, and operates under the auspices of the Diocese of Dallas.

John Paul II high school had about 750 students in the 2023–2024 school year.

== Athletics ==
John Paul II High School competes in the Texas Association of Private and Parochial Schools (TAPPS) at the 6A level. The school has 18 varsity athletic programs.

- The Girls’ Varsity Basketball team won the TAPPS 6A State Championship in 2013.
- The Boys’ Varsity Basketball team won the TAPPS 6A State Championship in 2020 and 2022.
- The Boys’ Varsity Soccer team won the TAPPS Division I State Championship on March 8, 2024, defeating San Antonio Central Catholic 2–1 at the Round Rock Sportsplex.
- The Girls’ Varsity Soccer won its first TAPPS Division I State Championship in 2022 with a 2–0 victory over Houston St. Pius X.
- The Varsity Boys’ Tennis team won the TAPPS State Championship in 2016.
- The Varsity Hockey team won a Texas Amateur Hockey Association (TAHA) State Championship in 2016.
- The Varsity Boys’ Swim team student, from the class of 2021, holds TAPPS state records in the 50-yard freestyle, 100-yard freestyle, and 200-yard freestyle and won six individual state titles.
- A a student set TAPPS state records in the 110-meter hurdles (14.77 seconds) and 300-meter hurdles (37.83 seconds) at the 2019 State Championships.
- The Cardinal Belles drill team won TAPPS State Championships in 2015, 2019, 2020, 2021, 2022, 2023, 2024, and 2025.
- The Varsity Cheerleading team won the Division I State Championship in 2022.
- The Varsity Softball team won the TAPPS 6A State Championship in 2021, 2023, and 2025.

Boys teams	Girls teams
Baseball	Softball
Basketball
Cross Country
Football	
Golf
Lacrosse
Soccer
Swimming
Track & Field
Tennis
Volleyball
Water Polo

== Notable alumni ==
- Grayson James (2021 - transferred), quarterback for the Boston College Eagles
- Jaylon Tyson (2021), basketball player for the Cleveland Cavaliers
- Liam McNeeley (2024 - transferred), basketball player for the Charlotte Hornets
