= Craig Porter Jr. =

American basketball player (born 2000)

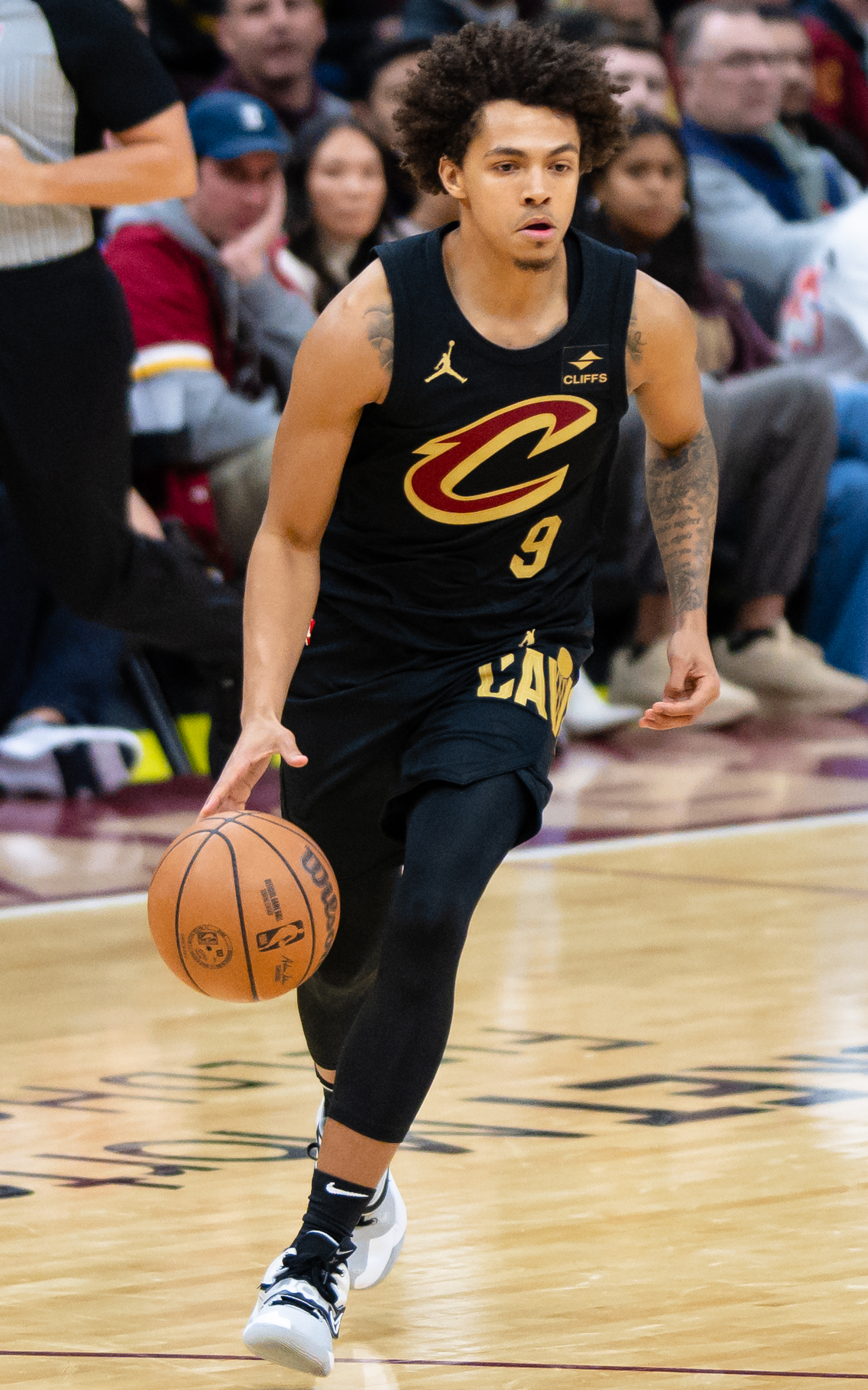
- Porter with the Cleveland Cavaliers in 2023

No. 9 – Cleveland Cavaliers
- Position: Point guard
- League: NBA

Personal information
- Born: February 26, 2000 (age 26) Terre Haute, Indiana, U.S.
- Listed height: 6 ft 1 in (1.85 m)
- Listed weight: 194 lb (88 kg)

Career information
- High school: South (Terre Haute, Indiana)
- College: Vincennes (2018–2019); Wichita State (2020–2023)
- NBA draft: 2023: undrafted
- Playing career: 2023–present

Career history
- 2023–present: Cleveland Cavaliers
- 2024–2025: →Cleveland Charge

Career highlights
- Third-team All-AAC (2023); NJCAA national champion (2019)
- Stats at NBA.com
- Stats at Basketball Reference

Craig Porter Jr. (born February 26, 2000) is an American basketball player for the Cleveland Cavaliers of the National Basketball Association (NBA). He played college basketball for the Vincennes Trailblazers and the Wichita State Shockers.

== Early life and high school career ==
Porter Jr. was born on February 26, 2000, and grew up in Terre Haute, Indiana, where he attended Terre Haute South Vigo High School. During high school, he was named to the Indiana Basketball Coaches Association's Senior All-State Team and lead his team to the 4A state quarterfinals.

== College career ==
=== Vincennes ===
Porter Jr. started his collegiate career with the Vincennes Trailblazers, where he helped lead them to a combined 62–7 record over two seasons and a NJCAA national championship in 2019. After two seasons with the Trailblazers, he committed to Wichita State.

=== Wichita State ===
==== 2020–21 season ====
In his first season with the Shockers, Porter Jr. played in 19 games, starting in two of them, where he averaged 2.1 points, 2.1 rebounds, and 1.5 assists in 12.9 minutes per game. After the season he entered the transfer portal but returned to the Shockers.

==== 2021–22 season ====
In his second year at Wichita State, Porter Jr. played in 25 games, starting in 24, in which he averaged 7.3 points, 4.9 rebounds, and 3.6 assists in 26.9 minutes per game. After the season, he entered his name into the transfer portal. However Porter Jr. returned after two former Wichita State baseball players formed a name, image and likeness (NIL) collective called Armchair Strategies.

==== 2022–23 season ====
On February 26, 2023, Porter Jr. posted a triple double, recording 15 points, 10 rebounds, and 10 assists, while also adding three steals in a 83–76 over Tulane. He finished the season playing 31 games, starting in 30, putting up 13.5 points, 6.2 rebounds, and 4.9 assists in 33.6 minutes per game, earning third-team All-AAC honors. After the season, Porter Jr. announced that he would forgo his final year of eligibility to declare for the NBA draft.

== Professional career ==
After going undrafted in the 2023 NBA draft, Porter Jr. signed a two-way contract with the Cleveland Cavaliers on July 7, 2023. On November 19, he recorded 21 points, four assists and four rebounds off the bench in a 121–109 win over the Denver Nuggets. On February 14, 2024, Porter Jr. signed a standard contract with the Cavaliers, being assigned several times to the Cleveland Charge throughout his rookie and sophomore seasons.

== Career statistics ==
Legend
GP	Games played	GS	Games started	MPG	Minutes per game
FG%	Field goal percentage	3P%	3-point field goal percentage	FT%	Free throw percentage
RPG	Rebounds per game	APG	Assists per game	SPG	Steals per game
BPG	Blocks per game	PPG	Points per game	**Bold**	Career high

=== NBA ===
==== Regular season ====
Year	Team	GP	GS	MPG	FG%	3P%	FT%	RPG	APG	SPG	BPG	PPG
2023–24	Cleveland	51	**6**	12.7	.509	.353	**.732**	2.1	2.3	.4	.3	**5.6**
2024–25	Cleveland	51	1	10.1	**.514**	**.438**	.719	1.3	1.4	.3	.3	3.7
2025–26	Cleveland	**64**	3	**17.9**	.450	.355	.600	**3.4**	**3.2**	**.9**	**.6**	4.5
Career		166	10	13.9	.486	.377	.688	2.4	2.4	.6	.4	4.6

==== Playoffs ====
Year	Team	GP	GS	MPG	FG%	3P%	FT%	RPG	APG	SPG	BPG	PPG
2025	Cleveland	6	0	**5.8**	**.500**	.000	—	**1.0**	**1.5**	**.5**	**.3**	**2.0**
2026	Cleveland	**7**	0	3.0	.333	.000	—	.4	.6	.0	.0	.3
Career		13	0	4.3	.467	.000	—	.7	1.0	.2	.2	1.1
