= Jarrett Allen =

American basketball player (born 1998)

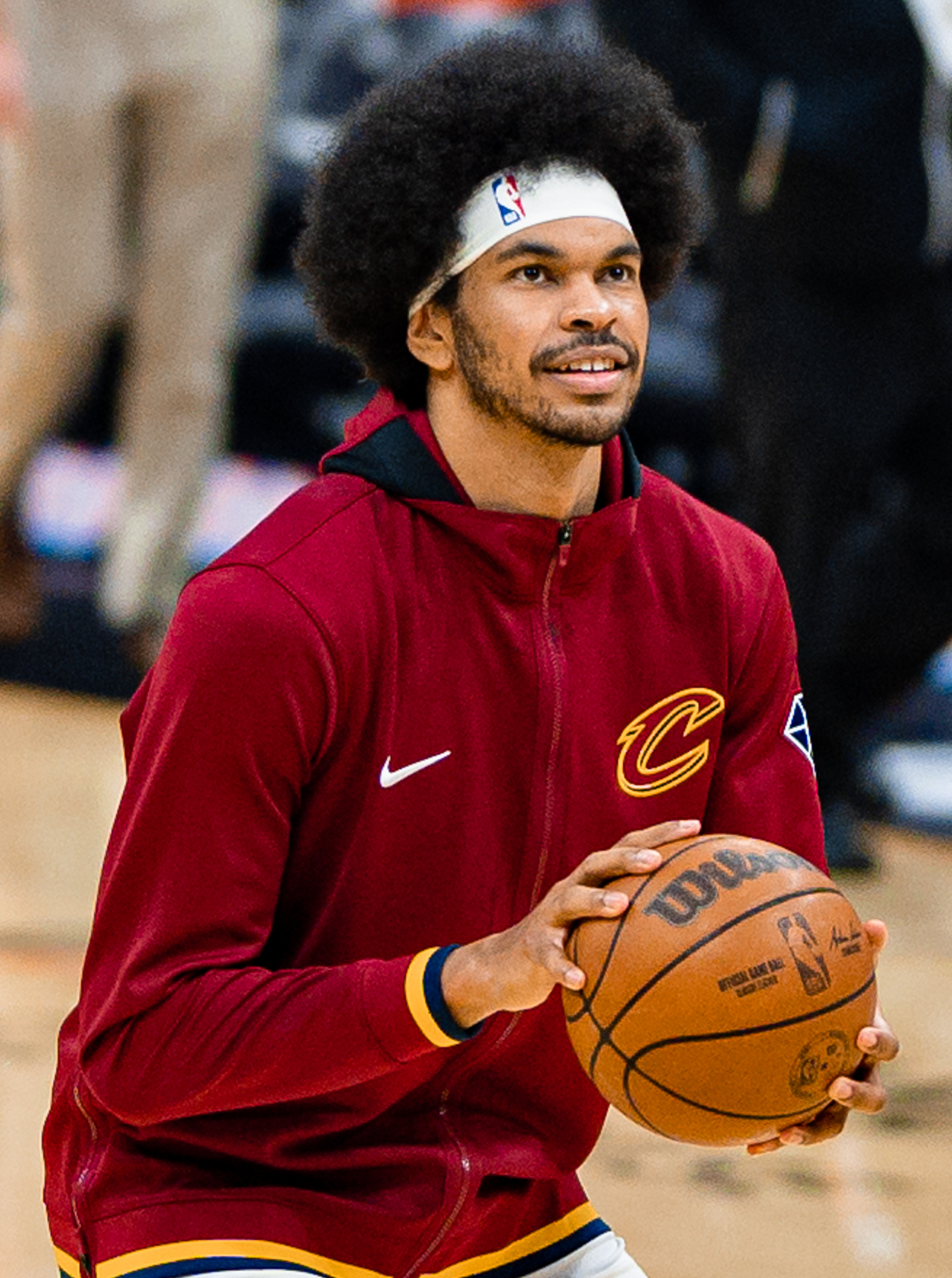
- Allen with the Cleveland Cavaliers in 2021

No. 31 – Cleveland Cavaliers
- Position: Center
- League: NBA

Personal information
- Born: April 21, 1998 (age 28) San Diego, California, U.S.
- Listed height: 6 ft 9 in (2.06 m)
- Listed weight: 250 lb (113 kg)

Career information
- High school: Round Rock (Round Rock, Texas); St. Stephen's Episcopal School (Austin, Texas)
- College: Texas (2016–2017)
- NBA draft: 2017: 1st round, 22nd overall pick
- Drafted by: Brooklyn Nets
- Playing career: 2017–present

Career history
- 2017–2021: Brooklyn Nets
- 2021–present: Cleveland Cavaliers

Career highlights
- NBA All-Star (2022); Third-team All-Big 12 (2017); McDonald's All-American (2016)
- Stats at NBA.com
- Stats at Basketball Reference
Medals
Men's basketball
Representing the United States
FIBA Americas U18 Championship
| Gold medal – first place | 2016 Chile | National team |

Jarrett Allen (born April 21, 1998) is an American professional basketball player for the Cleveland Cavaliers of the National Basketball Association (NBA). He played college basketball for the Texas Longhorns and was selected 22nd overall by the Brooklyn Nets in the 2017 NBA draft. In January 2021, he was traded to the Cleveland Cavaliers as part of a four-team blockbuster James Harden trade. In February 2022, Allen was named to his first NBA All-Star Game.

Allen has the highest offensive rating (130.1) of any player in NBA history (minimum 15,000 minutes played).

== Early life ==
Born in San Diego, California, Allen attended Walsh Middle School in Round Rock, Texas, which feeds into Round Rock High School, for his freshman year of high school. He then transferred to St. Stephen's Episcopal School in Austin, Texas for his final three years and went on to win two SPC championships. He played in the 2016 McDonald's All-American Boys Game. He committed to the University of Texas at Austin to play college basketball.

Allen was rated as a five-star recruit and ranked No. 15 overall player in the Class of 2016.

== College career ==
As a freshman at the University of Texas, Allen averaged 13.4 points and 8.4 rebounds per game. However, Texas finished with a disappointing 11–22 record. His best game was a 22-point, 19-rebound performance in a 12-point loss to Kansas. After the season, he entered the 2017 NBA draft but did not initially hire an agent before deciding to forgo his remaining three years of college eligibility.

== Professional career ==
=== Brooklyn Nets (2017–2021) ===
Allen was selected with the 22nd overall pick in the 2017 NBA draft by the Brooklyn Nets, and signed his rookie scale deal with the Nets on July 20. He was 19 years and 182 days old when he made his NBA debut on October 20, becoming the second-youngest player ever to set foot on the court for the Nets, just behind Derrick Favors. He finished the game with nine points on 3-for-3 shooting, two rebounds and one block. On January 25, 2018, Allen joined the starting lineup for the first time and recorded a career-high 16 points and 12 rebounds in a 116–108 win over the Philadelphia 76ers. On February 2, in a game against the Los Angeles Lakers, Allen scored a career-high 20 points, as well as five rebounds and one block. On February 7, he grabbed a career-high 14 rebounds and scored 13 points in a 115–106 loss to the Detroit Pistons. On March 21, 2018, Allen recorded four blocks, which matched his career high, as well as six rebounds and nine points in a 111–105 loss to the Charlotte Hornets. On April 5, he got a career-high five blocks in a 119–111 victory over the Milwaukee Bucks.

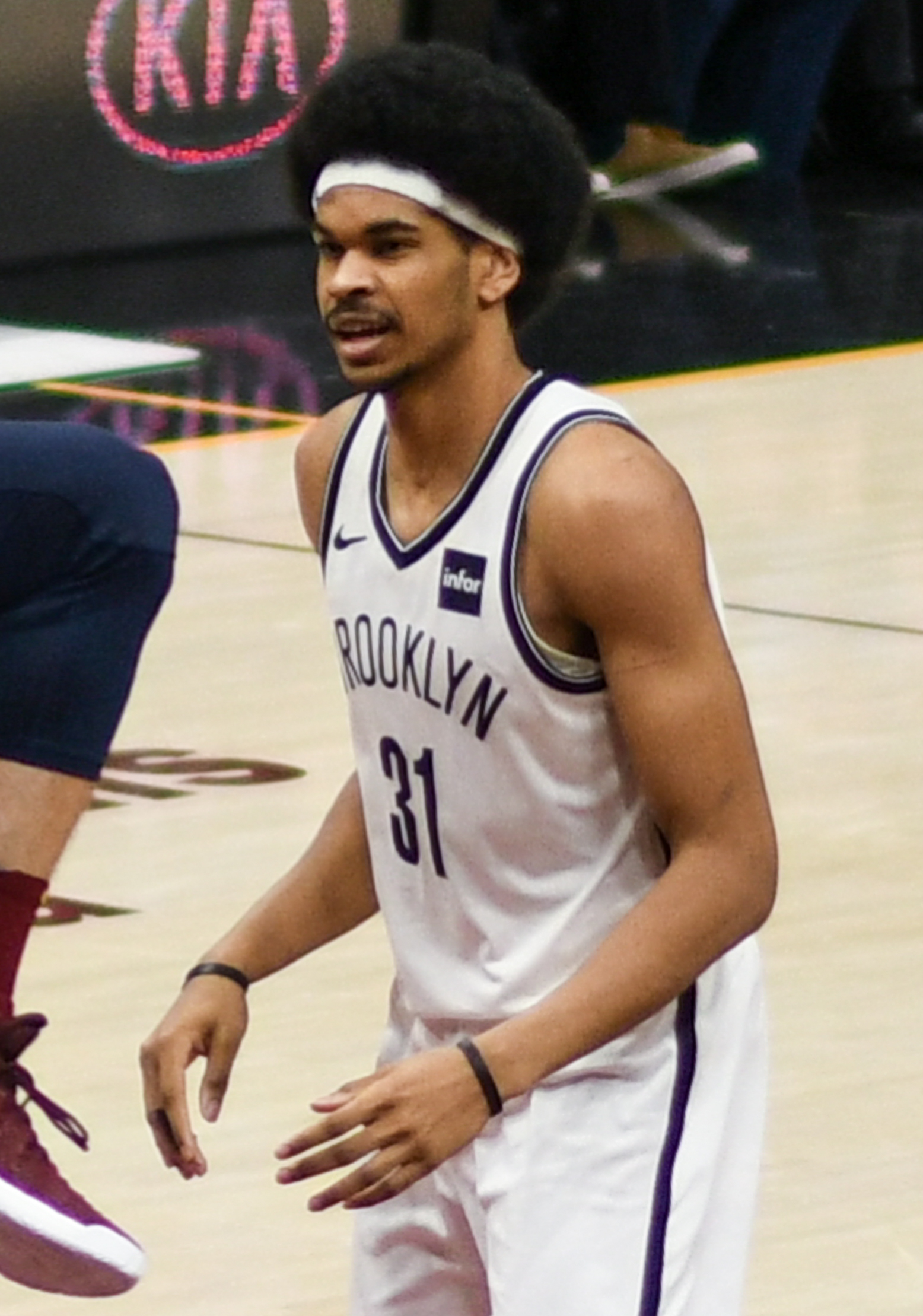
Allen in 2018

On November 17, 2018, Allen recorded a career-high 24 points and grabbed 11 rebounds in a 127–119 loss to the Los Angeles Clippers. On November 20, he grabbed a season-high 14 rebounds and scored 13 points as the Nets defeated the Miami Heat. On January 16, 2019, Allen recorded 20 points and a career-high 24 rebounds in the Nets' 145–142 overtime victory over the Houston Rockets.

=== Cleveland Cavaliers (2021–present) ===
On January 14, 2021, Allen was traded to the Cleveland Cavaliers in a multi-player, four-team deal with the Rockets that sent James Harden to the Nets.

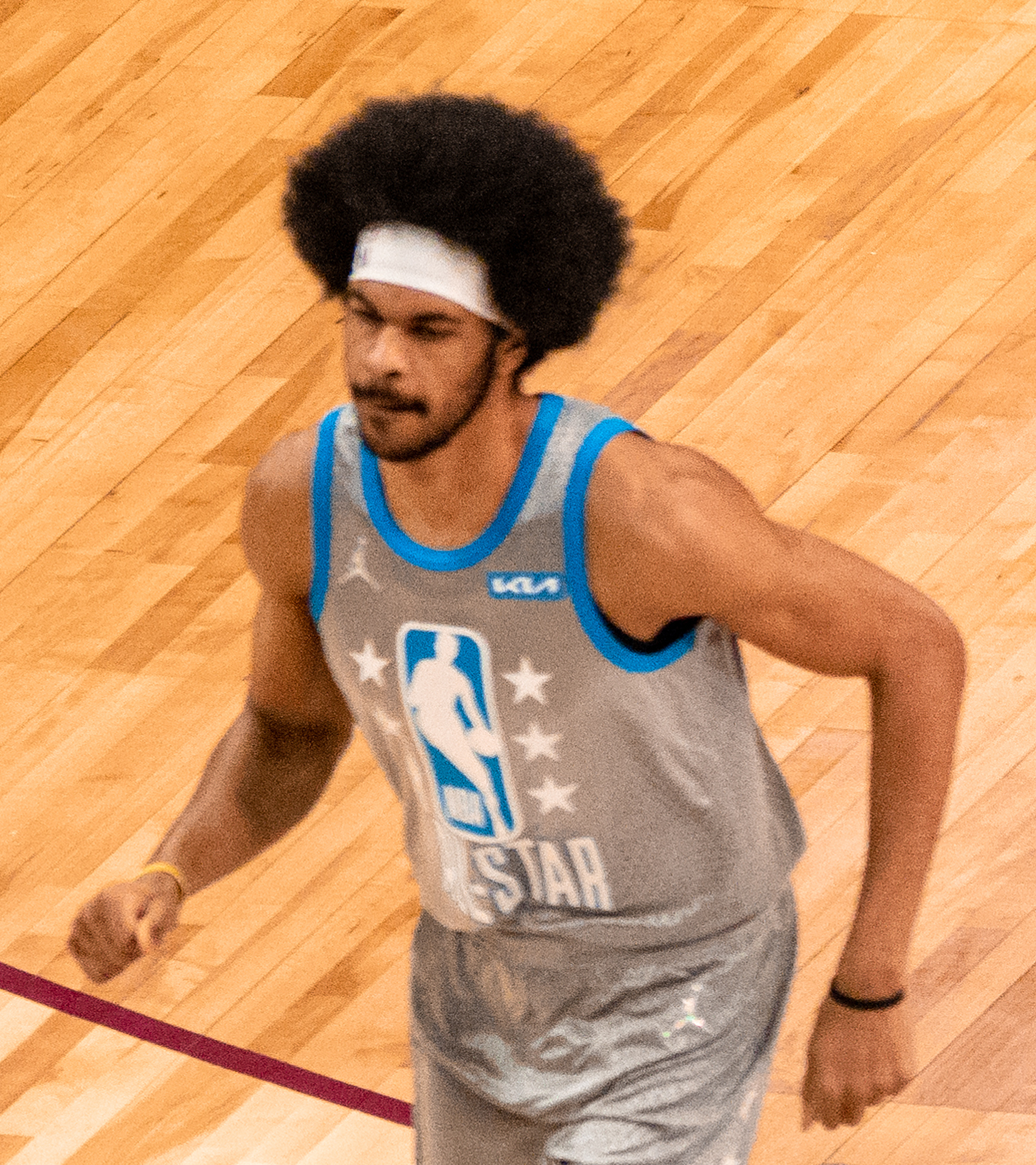
Allen at the 2022 NBA All-Star Game in Cleveland

On July 23, 2021, Cleveland extended a qualifying offer to Allen, making him a restricted free agent. Allen signed a five-year, $100 million contract with Cleveland on August 6. On October 20, 2021, in a 132–121 loss to the Memphis Grizzlies, Allen became the first player since the shot clock was introduced in the 1954–55 NBA season to make 10 or more field goals without a miss in a season-opener. Allen was named a replacement for Harden, for whom he was traded a year prior, on Team LeBron in the 2022 NBA All-Star Game.

Starting all the 56 games he played, Allen finished the 2021–22 season averaging a number of career best with 16.1 points, 10.8 rebounds, 1.6 assists, 1.3 blocks and .8 steals per game, while shooting .677, .100 and .708 from the field, the three-point line and on free throws, respectively, on 32.3 minutes per game. Alongside rookie and fellow Cavalier Evan Mobley, Allen led Cleveland from a .306 winning percentage and the league's sixth-worst defense to a .537 winning percentage and the league's fifth-best defense for efficiency; it was .578 before Allen suffered a fractured finger injury in early March.

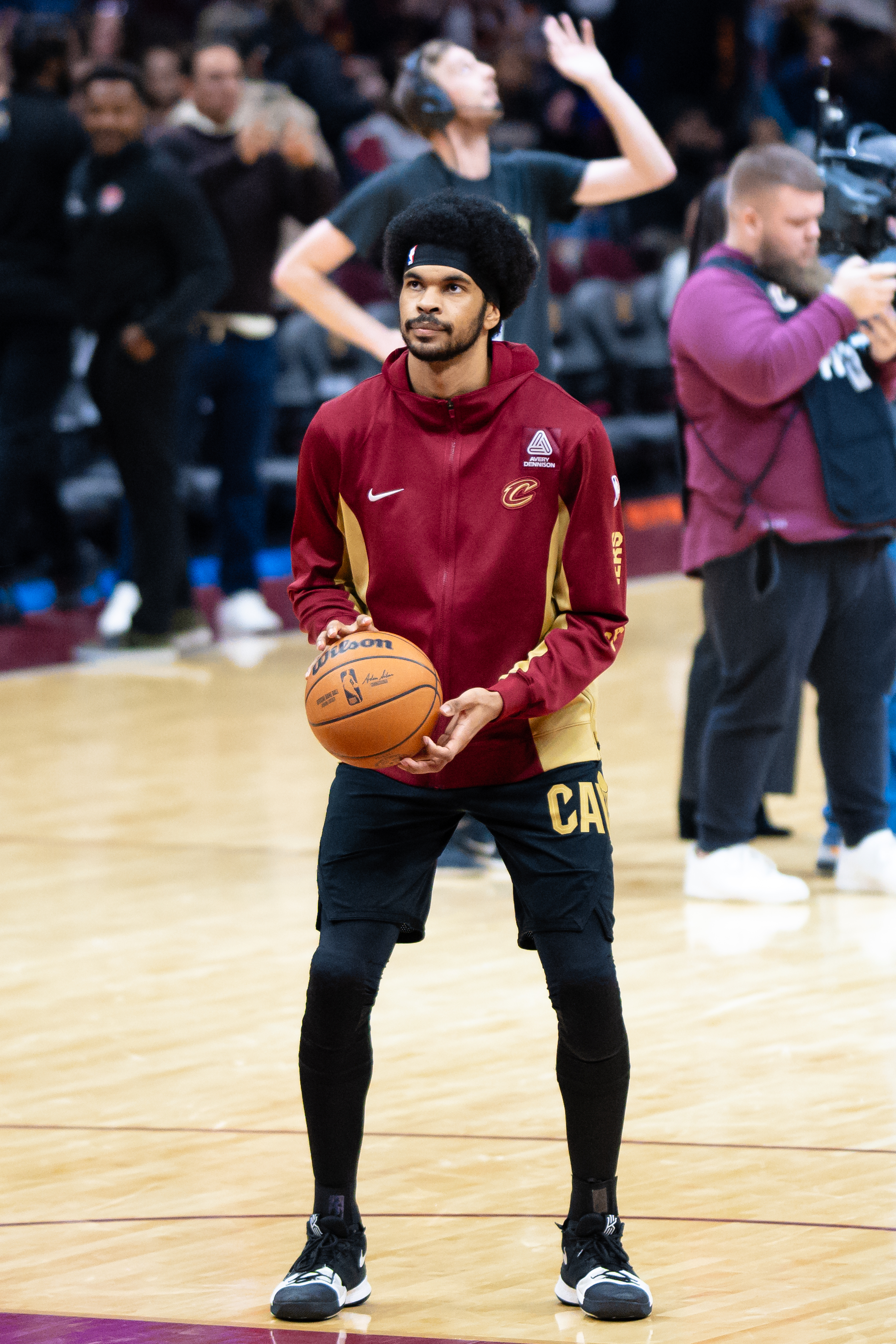
Allen in 2023

On December 28, 2023, he scored 24 points, grabbed 23 rebounds, recorded 6 assists and 2 steals in a 113–110 victory over the Dallas Mavericks. The next day, Allen posted 30 points, 12 rebounds, six assists and two blocks on 15-of-17 shooting from the field in a 119–111 loss against the Milwaukee Bucks. On January 22, 2024, he set the franchise record for consecutive double-doubles during a win against the Orlando Magic by passing the 11-game streak held by both Andre Drummond and Elmore Smith. In game 2 of the Cavaliers' first-round playoffs series against the Orlando Magic, Allen recorded a playoff career-high 20 rebounds, along with 16 points, three assists, two steals and three blocks in a 96–86 win.

On July 31, 2024, Allen and the Cavaliers agreed to a three-year, $91 million max contract extension. He started all 82 games for Cleveland during the 2024–25 NBA season, posting averages of 13.5 points, 9.7 rebounds and 1.9 assists. In October 2025, Allen suffered a left ring finger injury during the game against the Boston Celtics. After getting assessed, it was confirmed it was a non-displaced fracture of his distal phalanx On February 2, 2026, Allen recorded a career-high 40 points, 17 rebounds, five assists, two steals and four blocks in a 130–111 win over the Portland Trail Blazers.

On May 3, 2026, Allen tied his playoff career high of 22 points, and added 19 rebounds, as the Cavaliers defeated the Toronto Raptors 114–102 in game 7 of the first-round series.

== Career statistics ==
Legend
| GP | Games played | GS | Games started | MPG | Minutes per game |
| FG% | Field goal percentage | 3P% | 3-point field goal percentage | FT% | Free throw percentage |
| RPG | Rebounds per game | APG | Assists per game | SPG | Steals per game |
| BPG | Blocks per game | PPG | Points per game | **Bold** | Career high |
| * | Led the league |

=== NBA ===
==== Regular season ====
| Year | Team | GP | GS | MPG | FG% | 3P% | FT% | RPG | APG | SPG | BPG | PPG |
|---|---|---|---|---|---|---|---|---|---|---|---|---|
| 2017–18 | Brooklyn | 72 | 31 | 20.0 | .589 | **.333** | **.776** | 5.4 | .7 | .4 | 1.2 | 8.2 |
| 2018–19 | Brooklyn | 80 | 80 | 26.2 | .590 | .133 | .709 | 8.4 | 1.4 | .5 | 1.5 | 10.9 |
| 2019–20 | Brooklyn | 70 | 64 | 26.5 | .649 | .000 | .633 | 9.6 | 1.6 | .6 | 1.3 | 11.1 |
| 2020–21 | Brooklyn | 12 | 5 | 26.6 | .677 | — | .754 | 10.4 | 1.7 | .6 | **1.6** | 11.2 |
| 2020–21 | Cleveland | 51 | 40 | 30.3 | .609 | .316 | .690 | 9.9 | 1.7 | .5 | 1.4 | 13.2 |
| 2021–22 | Cleveland | 56 | 56 | 32.3 | .677 | .100 | .708 | **10.8** | 1.6 | .8 | 1.3 | 16.1 |
| 2022–23 | Cleveland | 68 | 68 | **32.6** | .644 | .100 | .733 | 9.8 | 1.7 | .8 | 1.2 | 14.3 |
| 2023–24 | Cleveland | 77 | 77 | 31.7 | .634 | .000 | .742 | 10.5 | **2.7** | .7 | 1.1 | **16.5** |
| 2024–25 | Cleveland | **82*** | **82*** | 28.0 | **.706*** | .000 | .718 | 9.7 | 1.9 | .9 | .9 | 13.5 |
| 2025–26 | Cleveland | 56 | 56 | 27.1 | .638 | .100 | .709 | 8.5 | 1.8 | **1.0** | .8 | 15.4 |
| Career | | 624 | 559 | 28.1 | .641 | .159 | .711 | 9.2 | 1.7 | .7 | 1.2 | 13.1 |
| All-Star | | 1 | 0 | 24.0 | .833 | .000 | — | 9.0 | 1.0 | 1.0 | 2.0 | 10.0 |

==== Playoffs ====
| Year | Team | GP | GS | MPG | FG% | 3P% | FT% | RPG | APG | SPG | BPG | PPG |
|---|---|---|---|---|---|---|---|---|---|---|---|---|
| 2019 | Brooklyn | 5 | 5 | 22.0 | .594 | — | .850 | 6.8 | 2.2 | .6 | .6 | 11.0 |
| 2020 | Brooklyn | 4 | 4 | 33.1 | .583 | — | .813 | **14.8** | 2.3 | .5 | **1.8** | 10.3 |
| 2023 | Cleveland | 5 | 5 | **38.1** | .611 | — | .500 | 7.4 | **2.4** | .8 | 1.0 | 9.4 |
| 2024 | Cleveland | 4 | 4 | 31.7 | .676 | — | .692 | 13.8 | 1.3 | 1.3 | 1.0 | **17.0** |
| 2025 | Cleveland | 9 | 9 | 29.0 | **.721** | — | **.943** | 8.4 | 1.3 | **1.4** | .9 | 13.4 |
| 2026 | Cleveland | **18** | **18** | 29.4 | .635 | — | .579 | 7.2 | 1.1 | 1.0 | 1.7 | 12.7 |
| Career | | 45 | 45 | 30.0 | .645 | — | .702 | 8.7 | 1.5 | 1.0 | 1.3 | 12.5 |

=== College ===
| Year | Team | GP | GS | MPG | FG% | 3P% | FT% | RPG | APG | SPG | BPG | PPG |
|---|---|---|---|---|---|---|---|---|---|---|---|---|
| 2016–17 | Texas | 33 | 33 | 32.2 | .566 | .000 | .564 | 8.4 | .8 | .6 | 1.5 | 13.4 |

== Personal life ==
Allen's father Leonard was drafted by the Dallas Mavericks in the 1985 NBA draft and played at San Diego State and in Spain. His older brother Leonard Jr. committed to playing collegiate basketball for Baylor University, but took a leave of absence in 2017.

In July 2025, Allen married his longtime partner, Jordyn January in Austin, Texas. The two got engaged in 2023.

== See also ==
- List of NBA career field goal percentage leaders
