= Koby Altman =

American basketball executive (born 1982)

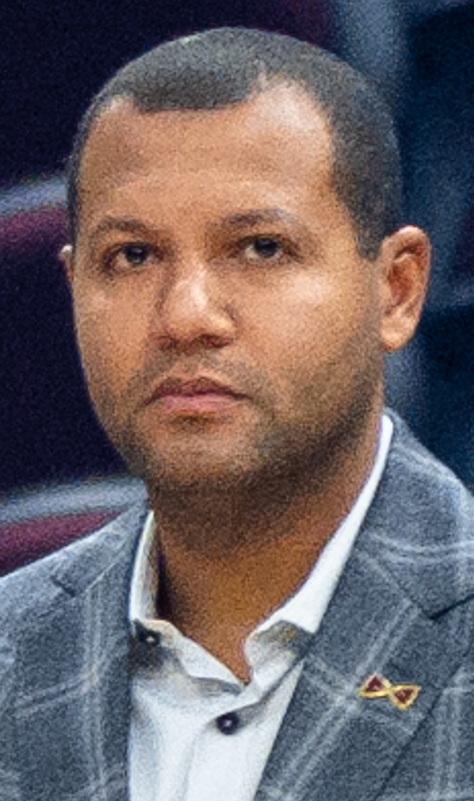
- Altman in 2022

Cleveland Cavaliers
- Position: President of Basketball Operations
- League: NBA

Personal information
- Born: September 16, 1982 (age 44) Brooklyn, New York, U.S.

Career information
- High school: New Utrecht (Brooklyn, New York)
- College: Middlebury (2000–2004)
- Coaching career: 2007–2012

Career history

Coaching
- 2007–2009: Amherst (assistant)
- 2009–2010: Southern Illinois (assistant)
- 2010–2012: Columbia (assistant)

Career highlights
- As executive: NBA champion (2016)

Koby Altman (born September 16, 1982) is an American basketball executive who currently serves as the President of Basketball Operations of the Cleveland Cavaliers of the National Basketball Association (NBA).

== Early life ==
Born to a Jewish mother and an African American father (who was not in his life), Altman was raised in Brooklyn, New York. He received his bachelor's degree at Middlebury College as a Posse Foundation Scholar, where he was a three-year starter at point guard for the basketball team. After graduation, Altman went into real estate investment sales for three years. He then went to the University of Massachusetts Amherst (UMass), earning a master's degree in sports management. During that time, Altman was an assistant coach at nearby Amherst College. After graduating from UMass, he continued in college coaching for several years, first as a graduate assistant at Southern Illinois in 2009–10 and then as a full-time assistant at Columbia.

== NBA executive ==
Altman joined the Cavaliers front office in 2012, would gradually rise through the ranks, was part of the 2016 NBA Championship team as director of pro personnel, and became assistant general manager for the 2016–17 season before being promoted to president of basketball operations on July 24, 2017.

In his first major move as general manager, Altman acquired an unprotected 2018 first-round draft pick (through the Brooklyn Nets), All-Star point guard Isaiah Thomas, rookie center Ante Žižić, small forward Jae Crowder, and a 2020 second-round pick (through the Miami Heat) from the Boston Celtics in exchange for disgruntled star point guard Kyrie Irving. In September 2017, Altman's second major move came in the signing of three-time NBA Champion and multi-time All-Star guard Dwyane Wade. In February 2018, Altman made several trades during the trade deadline which saw Thomas, Channing Frye, Crowder, Derrick Rose, Iman Shumpert, Dwyane Wade, and their 2018 first-round pick traded away. In return, the Cavaliers received Rodney Hood, George Hill, Jordan Clarkson, and Larry Nance Jr. Notable draft picks for the Cavaliers under Altman include the 2018 eighth pick, Collin Sexton, the 2019 fifth pick, Darius Garland, the 2020 fifth pick, Isaac Okoro, and the 2021 third pick, Evan Mobley.

On July 14, 2025, Altman and the Cavaliers agreed to a multiyear contract extension running through the 2029–30 season.

== Awards and honors ==
- 2016 NBA champion (as a member of the Cavaliers front office)

Sporting positions
Preceded by David Griffin	Cleveland Cavaliers General Manager; 2017–2022	Succeeded by Mike Gansey
