= Isaac Okoro =

Nigerian-American basketball player (born 2001)

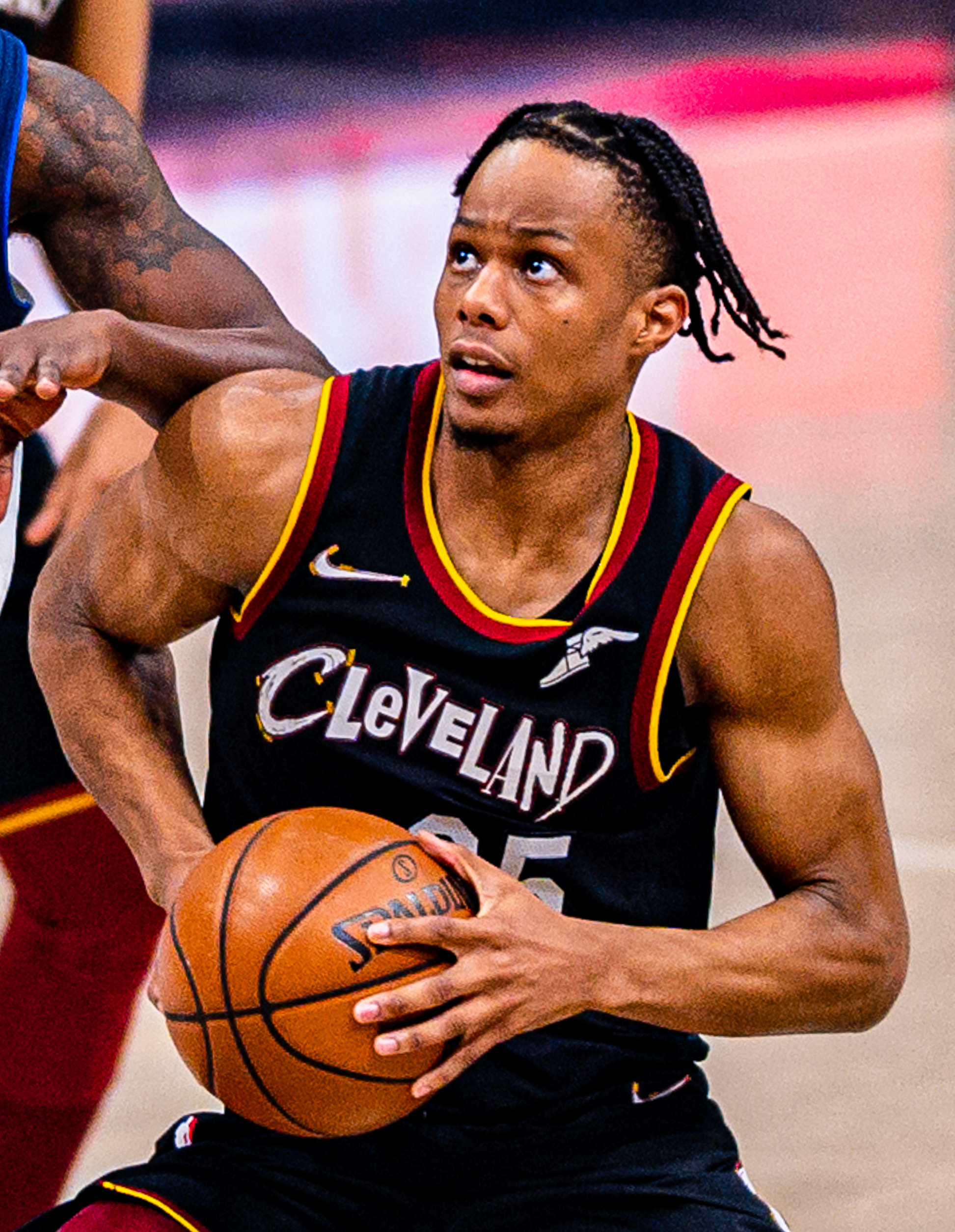
- Okoro with the Cleveland Cavaliers in 2021

No. 35 – Chicago Bulls
- Position: Small forward / shooting guard
- League: NBA

Personal information
- Born: January 26, 2001 (age 25) Atlanta, Georgia, U.S.
- Listed height: 6 ft 6 in (1.98 m)
- Listed weight: 225 lb (102 kg)

Career information
- High school: McEachern (Powder Springs, Georgia)
- College: Auburn (2019–2020)
- NBA draft: 2020: 1st round, 5th overall pick
- Drafted by: Cleveland Cavaliers
- Playing career: 2020–present

Career history
- 2020–2025: Cleveland Cavaliers
- 2025–present: Chicago Bulls

Career highlights
- NBA All-Rookie Second Team (2021); Second-team All-SEC (2020); SEC All-Freshman Team (2020); SEC All-Defensive Team (2020)
- Stats at NBA.com
- Stats at Basketball Reference
Medals
Men's basketball
Representing United States
FIBA Under-17 World Cup
Gold medal – first place	2018 Argentina	Team

Isaac Nnamdi Okoro (/əˈkɔːroʊ/ ə-KOR-oh; born January 26, 2001) is an American professional basketball player for the Chicago Bulls of the National Basketball Association (NBA). He played college basketball for the Auburn Tigers. Listed at 6 feet 4 inches (1.93 m) and 225 pounds (102 kg), he plays the small forward position.

Okoro played basketball for McEachern High School in Georgia for four years, helping his team win the state championship and achieve national success in his senior season. He was considered a five-star recruit by Rivals and a four-star recruit by 247Sports and ESPN. After his freshman college season at Auburn, he was named to the second team All-SEC.

== Early life ==
Okoro was born in Atlanta, Georgia to Nigerian parents and was raised in metro Atlanta. His father, Godwin, emigrated from Nigeria in the 1980s. His mother, Gloria, is also from Nigeria. Okoro started playing basketball in his local church league. When he was around seven to eight years old, he began training under the guidance of Amateur Athletic Union (AAU) coach Omar Cooper, the father of his future high school teammate, Sharife Cooper. He played for the A.O.T. Running Rebels of the Nike EYBL circuit.

== High school career ==
Okoro played high school basketball for McEachern High School in Powder Springs, Georgia. In his freshman season, he averaged 15 points and eight rebounds per game, helping his team win the regional title and reach the Georgia High School Association Class 7A state quarterfinals. As a sophomore, Okoro averaged 22.5 points per game, leading McEachern to the regional championship and the Class 7A state semifinals. He earned Atlanta Journal-Constitution Class 7A All-State second team and MaxPreps Sophomore All-American third team honors. In his junior season, Okoro averaged 20.3 points and 6.4 rebounds per game, helping McEachern reach the Class 7A state quarterfinals. He was named to the Atlanta Journal-Constitution Class 7A All-State first team and the USA Today All-USA Georgia first team. In the offseason, Okoro had success on the Nike Elite Youth Basketball League, a prominent amateur circuit, with Athletes of Tomorrow.

In his senior season, Okoro averaged 19.7 points, 10.6 rebounds, 3.2 assists and 2.7 steals per game. He led McEachern to titles at the City of Palms Classic and the Tournament of Champions. His team ended the regular season with a 32–0 record, becoming the first undefeated team in the highest Georgia classification since 1995 and receiving a No. 1 national ranking from multiple websites, including MaxPreps. Okoro scored 16 points to help his team win its first Class 7A state championship. He shared Atlanta Journal-Constitution state most valuable player recognition with teammate Sharife Cooper. Okoro was named to the MaxPreps All-American second team and the USA Today All-USA Georgia first team. On April 12, 2019, Okoro competed in the Nike Hoop Summit, an international all-star game. On April 26, 2019, Okoro became only the second basketball player in McEachern history to have his jersey retired.

=== Recruiting ===
By the end of his high school career, Okoro was considered a five-star recruit by Rivals and a four-star recruit by 247Sports and ESPN. On July 25, 2018, he committed to play college basketball for Auburn over offers from Florida, Florida State, Oregon and Texas, among others. Okoro became the second-highest-ranked commit in program history, according to 247Sports composite rankings, behind only Mustapha Heron.

College recruiting
Name	Hometown	School	Height	Weight	Commit date
Isaac Okoro; SF	Powder Springs, GA	McEachern (GA)	6 ft 6 in (1.98 m)	215 lb (98 kg)	Jul 25, 2018
Isaac Okoro; SF	Recruit ratings: Rivals: 247Sports: ESPN: (88)				
Overall recruit ranking: Rivals: 31 247Sports: 37 ESPN: 40
Note: In many cases, Scout, Rivals, 247Sports, On3, and ESPN may conflict in their listings of height and weight.; In these cases, the average was taken. ESPN grades are on a 100-point scale.; Sources: "Auburn 2019 Basketball Commitments". Rivals.; "2019 Auburn Tigers Recruiting Class". ESPN.; "2019 Team Ranking". Rivals.

== College career ==
Okoro scored 12 points in his Auburn debut, a 84–73 win over Georgia Southern. The following game, he registered 17 points in a 76–66 victory over Davidson. Okoro was named Southeastern Conference (SEC) Freshman of the Week on November 18, 2019. He scored a season-high 23 points in a 83–79 win over Vanderbilt on January 8, 2020. He did not play in a February 15 game against Missouri due to a hamstring injury. After the regular season, he was named to the All-SEC Second Team, the SEC All-Freshman Team and the SEC All-Defensive Team by the league's coaches. Okoro averaged 12.9 points, 4.4 rebounds and two assists per game. After his freshman season, he announced that he would enter the 2020 NBA draft.

== Professional career ==
=== Cleveland Cavaliers (2020–2025) ===
Okoro was selected with the fifth pick overall by the Cleveland Cavaliers in the 2020 NBA draft. Three days later on November 21, the Cavaliers announced that they had signed Okoro. In the Cavaliers' first preseason game of the 2020–21 NBA season, he scored the game-winning and-one to make it 114–116 and converted the free throw to make it 114–117 and win against the Indiana Pacers. On December 23, 2020, Okoro made his NBA debut, starting and recording 11 points, five assists, and three rebounds in a 121–114 win over the Charlotte Hornets. On May 4, 2021, he scored a career-high 32 points during a 134–118 overtime loss to the Phoenix Suns.

On March 23, 2023, Okoro had one rebound, one assist, and scored 11 points, including a game-winning three-pointer, in a 116–114 win over the Brooklyn Nets.

On September 17, 2024, Okoro signed a three-year, $33 million contract with the Cavaliers.

=== Chicago Bulls (2025–present) ===
On July 6, 2025, Okoro was traded to the Chicago Bulls in exchange for Lonzo Ball.

== National team career ==
Okoro played for the United States at the 2018 FIBA Under-17 Basketball World Cup in Argentina. In seven games, he averaged 4.3 points, 1.9 rebounds and 1.6 steals per game, helping his team win the gold medal.

== Career statistics ==
Legend
GP	Games played	GS	Games started	MPG	Minutes per game
FG%	Field goal percentage	3P%	3-point field goal percentage	FT%	Free throw percentage
RPG	Rebounds per game	APG	Assists per game	SPG	Steals per game
BPG	Blocks per game	PPG	Points per game	**Bold**	Career high

=== NBA ===
==== Regular season ====
Year	Team	GP	GS	MPG	FG%	3P%	FT%	RPG	APG	SPG	BPG	PPG
2020–21	Cleveland	67	**67**	**32.4**	.420	.290	.726	**3.1**	**1.9**	**.9**	.4	**9.6**
2021–22	Cleveland	67	61	29.6	.480	.350	.768	3.0	1.8	.8	.3	8.8
2022–23	Cleveland	**76**	46	21.7	**.494**	.363	.757	2.5	1.1	.7	.4	6.4
2023–24	Cleveland	69	42	27.3	.490	**.391**	.679	3.0	**1.9**	.8	**.5**	9.4
2024–25	Cleveland	55	22	19.1	.464	.371	.717	2.4	1.2	.7	**.5**	6.1
2025–26	Chicago	63	62	26.9	.460	.330	**.795**	2.7	1.6	.6	.3	9.3
Career		397	300	26.3	.465	.347	.741	2.8	1.6	.8	.4	8.3

==== Playoffs ====
Year	Team	GP	GS	MPG	FG%	3P%	FT%	RPG	APG	SPG	BPG	PPG
2023	Cleveland	5	2	14.9	.478	.308	**1.000**	1.4	.8	.4	**.4**	**6.4**
2024	Cleveland	**12**	**7**	**21.9**	.357	.257	.778	**1.8**	**1.1**	**.9**	.3	5.5
2025	Cleveland	9	0	14.2	**.500**	**.375**	.625	1.2	.6	.7	.1	4.6
Career		26	9	17.8	.415	.297	.783	1.5	.8	.7	.3	5.3

=== College ===
Year	Team	GP	GS	MPG	FG%	3P%	FT%	RPG	APG	SPG	BPG	PPG
2019–20	Auburn	28	28	31.5	.514	.290	.672	4.4	2.0	.9	.9	12.9
Career		28	28	31.5	.514	.290	.672	4.4	2.0	.9	.9	12.9
