= Warith Alatishe =

Nigerian-American basketball player (born 2000)

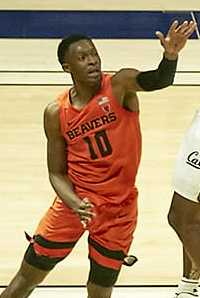
- Alatishe with Oregon State in 2021

No. 55 – Memphis Hustle
- Position: Small forward
- League: NBA G League

Personal information
- Born: January 22, 2000 (age 26) Ibadan, Nigeria
- Listed height: 6 ft 7 in (2.01 m)
- Listed weight: 200 lb (91 kg)

Career information
- High school: Westside (Houston, Texas)
- College: Nicholls (2018–2020); Oregon State (2020–2022)
- NBA draft: 2022: undrafted
- Playing career: 2022–present

Career history
- 2022–2024: Ontario Clippers
- 2024–2025: Texas Legends
- 2025–2026: Cleveland Charge
- 2026: Santos del Potosí
- 2026–present: Memphis Hustle

Career highlights
- Third-team All-Southland (2020); Pac-12 tournament MOP (2021)
- Stats at Basketball Reference

Abdul Warith Bolaji Alatishe (born January 22, 2000) is a Nigerian-American professional basketball player for the Memphis Hustle of the NBA G League. He played college basketball for the Nicholls Colonels and the Oregon State Beavers.

== Early life and high school career ==
Born in Ibadan, Nigeria, Alatishe moved to Houston, Texas at age three. He started playing organized basketball as a junior at Westside High School in Houston. He committed to playing college basketball at Nicholls, the only NCAA Division I program to offer him.

== College career ==
Alatishe received limited playing time as a freshman at Nicholls. As a sophomore, he averaged 10.9 points and 8.3 rebounds per game, earning Third Team All-Southland honors. For his junior season, Alatishe transferred to Oregon State. He chose the Beavers over Texas A&M, being drawn there by assistant coach Marlon Stewart. He received a waiver for immediate eligibility from the National Collegiate Athletic Association. As a junior, Alatishe earned Pac-12 All-Defensive Honorable Mention. He led Oregon State to its first Pac-12 tournament title and was named tournament most outstanding player. The Beavers received an automatic bid to the NCAA Tournament, and eventually reached their first NCAA Tournament Elite Eight in nearly 40 years; Alatishe recorded 7 points and over 9 rebounds per game during the tournament run. On the season, Alatishe averaged 9.5 points, 8.6 rebounds, and 1.4 blocks per game. Following the season, he declared for the 2021 NBA draft, but ultimately returned to Oregon State. He averaged 9.0 points and 5.1 rebounds per game in his senior campaign.

== Professional career ==
On October 24, 2022, Alatishe joined the Ontario Clippers.

On February 12, 2024, Alatishe was acquired by the Texas Legends in a three-team trade also including the Maine Celtics.

On February 25, 2025, Alatishe was acquired by the Cleveland Charge in a trade with the Texas Legends. He was signed and waived by the Cleveland Cavaliers on September 25. On October 25, 2025, the Cleveland Charge finalized their 16-man training camp roster and he was a returner alongside two other players

On September 9, 2026, Alatishe was acquired by the Memphis Hustle.

== Career statistics ==
Legend
GP	Games played	GS	Games started	MPG	Minutes per game
FG%	Field goal percentage	3P%	3-point field goal percentage	FT%	Free throw percentage
RPG	Rebounds per game	APG	Assists per game	SPG	Steals per game
BPG	Blocks per game	PPG	Points per game	**Bold**	Career high

*	Led NCAA Division I

=== College ===
Year	Team	GP	GS	MPG	FG%	3P%	FT%	RPG	APG	SPG	BPG	PPG
2018–19	Nicholls	13	0	7.8	.375	–	.429	1.7	.2	.2	.2	1.2
2019–20	Nicholls	31	29	25.3	**.555**	.222	**.711**	8.3	1.2	**1.7**	1.3	**10.9**
2020–21	Oregon State	**33***	**33***	**27.4**	.509	.071	.537	**8.6**	**1.8**	1.2	**1.4**	9.5
2021–22	Oregon State	28	20	24.5	.523	**.333**	.396	5.1	1.4	1.1	0.8	9.0
Career		105	82	23.6	.525	.211	.574	6.7	1.3	1.2	1.1	8.8

== Personal life ==
His father, Murtadha, is a longtime friend of Hall of Fame basketball player Hakeem Olajuwon. Both of his parents are nurses. Alatishe comes from a Muslim family.
