= 2020–21 California Golden Bears men's basketball team =

American college basketball season

2020–21 California Golden Bears men's basketball
- Conference: Pac-12 Conference
- Record: 9–20 (3–17 Pac–12)
- Head coach: Mark Fox (2nd season)
- Assistant coaches: Andrew Francis; Chris Harriman; Marty Wilson
- Home arena: Haas Pavilion (Capacity: 11,877)

2020–21 Pac-12 Conference men's basketball standings
	Conf.				Overall
Team	W		L	PCT	W		L	PCT
Oregon	14	–	4	.778	21	–	7	.750
No. 23 USC	15	–	5	.750	25	–	8	.758
No. 22 Colorado	14	–	6	.700	23	–	9	.719
UCLA	13	–	6	.684	22	–	10	.688
Arizona*	11	–	9	.550	17	–	9	.654
Oregon State †	10	–	10	.500	20	–	13	.606
Stanford	10	–	10	.500	14	–	13	.519
Utah	8	–	11	.421	12	–	13	.480
Arizona State	7	–	10	.412	11	–	14	.440
Washington State	7	–	12	.368	14	–	13	.519
Washington	4	–	16	.200	5	–	21	.192
California	3	–	17	.150	9	–	20	.310
† Conference tournament winner *Ineligible for the conference and NCAA tournaments due to self-imposed postseason ban. Rankings from AP poll

The 2020–21 California Golden Bears men's basketball team represented the University of California, Berkeley, in the 2020–21 NCAA Division I men's basketball season. In Mark Fox's second year as head coach at California, the Golden Bears played their home games at Haas Pavilion as members of the Pac-12 Conference.

== Previous season ==
The Golden Bears finished the 2019–20 season with a record of 14–18, 7–11 in Pac-12 play to finish in a three-way tie for eighth place. They defeated Stanford in the first round of the Pac-12 tournament and were set to take on UCLA in the quarterfinals before the remainder of the Pac-12 Tournament was cancelled amid the COVID-19 pandemic.

== Off-season ==
=== Departures ===
Name	Num	Pos.	Height	Weight	Year	Hometown	Reason for departure
Jacob Orender	0	G	5'11"	178	RS senior	Jacksonville Beach, FL	Walk-on; graduated
Juhwan Harris-Dyson	2	G	6'6"	204	Junior	Northridge, CA	Transferred
Paris Austin	3	G	6'0"	190	RS senior	Oakland, CA	Graduated
Kareem South	10	G	6'3"	185	RS senior	Toronto, ON	Graduated
Jules Erving	13	F	6'5"	208	Junior	Atlanta, GA	Walk-on; left the team for personal reasons
David Serge	23	G	6'4"	185	Senior	Newbury Park, CA	Walk-on; graduated
Jacobi Gordon	24	F	6'7"	216	Sophomore	Houston, TX	Transferred to Louisiana

=== Incoming transfers ===
Name	Num	Pos.	Height	Weight	Year	Hometown	Previous school
Ryan Betley	00	G	6'5"	200	RS senior	Downingtown, PA	Transferred from Penn. Was eligible to play immediately, since he graduated from Penn.
Jared Hyder	3	G	6'3"	180	Sophomore	San Bernardino, CA	Transferred from Fresno State. Under NCAA transfer rules, Hyder had to sit out for the 2020–21 season. Had three years of remaining eligibility.
Makale Foreman	10	G	6'1"	190	RS senior	Kingsport, TN	Transferred from Stony Brook. Was eligible to play immediately, since he graduated from Stony Brook.

=== 2020 recruiting class ===
College recruiting
Name	Hometown	School	Height	Weight	Commit date
Monty Bowser; PF	Oakland, CA	Bishop O'Dowd High School	6 ft 6 in (1.98 m)	190 lb (86 kg)	Oct 9, 2019
Monty Bowser; PF	Recruit ratings: Scout: Rivals: 247Sports: ESPN:				
Jalen Celestine; SG	Brookville, NY	Long Island Lutheran High School	6 ft 6 in (1.98 m)	185 lb (84 kg)	Nov 5, 2019
Jalen Celestine; SG	Recruit ratings: Scout: Rivals: 247Sports: ESPN:				
Overall recruit ranking:
Note: In many cases, Scout, Rivals, 247Sports, On3, and ESPN may conflict in their listings of height and weight.; In these cases, the average was taken. ESPN grades are on a 100-point scale.; Sources: "2020 California Commits". Rivals.; "2020 Team Ranking". Rivals.

=== 2021 recruiting class ===
College recruiting (2021)
Name	Hometown	School	Height	Weight	Commit date
Obinna Anyanwu #35 PF	San Diego, CA	Cathedral Catholic High School	6 ft 7 in (2.01 m)	215 lb (98 kg)	Nov 13, 2020
Obinna Anyanwu #35 PF	Recruit ratings: Scout: Rivals: 247Sports: ESPN:				
Marsalis Roberson; SG	Oakland, CA	Bishop O'Dowd High School	6 ft 4 in (1.93 m)	175 lb (79 kg)	Oct 8, 2020
Marsalis Roberson; SG	Recruit ratings: Scout: Rivals: 247Sports: ESPN:				
Sam Alajiki; PF	Newark, NJ	Saint Benedict's Prep	6 ft 7 in (2.01 m)	225 lb (102 kg)	Nov 6, 2020
Sam Alajiki; PF	Recruit ratings: Scout: Rivals: 247Sports: ESPN:				
Overall recruit ranking:
Note: In many cases, Scout, Rivals, 247Sports, On3, and ESPN may conflict in their listings of height and weight.; In these cases, the average was taken. ESPN grades are on a 100-point scale.; Sources: "2021 California Commits". Rivals.; "2021 Team Ranking". Rivals.

== Roster ==
2020–21 California Golden Bears men's basketball team
Players
Coaches

Pos.	#	Name	Height	Weight	Year	Previous school	Hometown
G	00	Ryan Betley	6 ft 5 in (1.96 m)	200 lb (91 kg)	RS Sr	Penn	Downingtown, Pennsylvania
G	1	Joel Brown	6 ft 2 in (1.88 m)	192 lb (87 kg)	So	Brewster Academy	Brampton, Ontario
F	2	Monty Bowser	6 ft 6 in (1.98 m)	185 lb (84 kg)	Fr	Bishop O'Dowd HS	Oakland, California
G	3	Jarred Hyder (redshirt)	6 ft 3 in (1.91 m)	180 lb (82 kg)	So	Fresno State	San Bernardino, California
G	10	Makale Foreman	6 ft 1 in (1.85 m)	190 lb (86 kg)	RS Sr	Stony Brook	Kingsport, Tennessee
F	13	Kuany Kuany	6 ft 9 in (2.06 m)	194 lb (88 kg)	So	Prolific Prep	Melbourne, Australia
F	15	Grant Anticevich	6 ft 8 in (2.03 m)	230 lb (104 kg)	Sr	Newington College	Sydney, Australia
G	20	Matt Bradley	6 ft 4 in (1.93 m)	220 lb (100 kg)	Jr	Wasatch Academy	San Bernardino, California
F/C	21	Lars Thiemann	7 ft 0 in (2.13 m)	248 lb (112 kg)	So	Bayer Giants U19	Krefeld, Germany
F	22	Andre Kelly	6 ft 8 in (2.03 m)	255 lb (116 kg)	Jr	Lincoln HS	Stockton, California
G	25	Logan Alters	6 ft 1 in (1.85 m)	175 lb (79 kg)	So	NSU University School	Miami, Florida
G	32	Jalen Celestine	6 ft 6 in (1.98 m)	185 lb (84 kg)	Fr	Long Island Lutheran HS	Glen Head, New York
F	33	D. J. Thorpe	6 ft 8 in (2.03 m)	235 lb (107 kg)	So	Lake Travis HS	Lake Travis, Texas
G	34	Dimitrios Klonaras	6 ft 6 in (1.98 m)	215 lb (98 kg)	So	P.A.O.K. BC	Thessaloniki, Greece
F	42	Blake Welle (W)	6 ft 7 in (2.01 m)	213 lb (97 kg)	RS So	Aptos HS	Santa Cruz, California

Head coach

- Mark Fox (Eastern New Mexico)

Assistant coach(es)

- Andrew Francis (Villanova)
- Chris Harriman (Augusta State)
- Marty Wilson (Pepperdine)

Legend

- (C) Team captain
- (S) Suspended
- (I) Ineligible
- (W) Walk-on
- Injured
- Current redshirt

Roster

== Schedule and results ==
Date time, TV	Rank^{#}	Opponent^{#}	Result	Record	High points	High rebounds	High assists	Site (attendance) city, state
Regular season
November 25, 2020*; 2:00 pm, P12N		vs. Colorado State; Oregon State MTE	Cancelled due to COVID-19 issues					Gill Coliseum; Corvallis, OR
November 25, 2020*; 4:00 pm, P12N		at Oregon State (Note: This game was arranged last-minute due to Colorado State dropping out due to COVID-19-related concerns. Due to these emergency circumstances, despite Oregon State being a member of the Pac-12, this game was, for technical reasons, considered a non-conference game and did not count towards the conference standings.); Oregon State MTE	L 63–71	0–1	21 – Bradley	10 – Anticevich	4 – Brown	Gill Coliseum (0); Corvallis, OR
November 26, 2020*; 3:00 pm, P12N		vs. Northwest; Oregon State MTE	W 86–61	1–1	14 – Betley	9 – Betley	6 – Foreman	Gill Coliseum (0); Corvallis, OR
November 30, 2020*; 4:30 pm, P12N		Nicholls	W 60–49	2–1	26 – Bradley	9 – Kelly	5 – Foreman	Haas Pavilion (0); Berkeley, CA
December 3, 2020; 7:00 pm, P12N		No. 25 Arizona State	L 62–70	2–2 (0–1)	20 – Bradley	8 – Bradley	3 – Foreman	Gill Coliseum (0); Corvallis, OR
December 6, 2020; 5:00 pm, P12N		at UCLA	L 56–76	2–3 (0–2)	14 – Foreman	5 – Kelly	5 – Brown	Pauley Pavilion (0); Los Angeles, CA
December 9, 2020*; 6:00 pm, CBSSN		at Pepperdine	L 62–74	2–4	27 – Bradley	8 – Anticevich	4 – Brown	Firestone Fieldhouse (0); Malibu, CA
December 13, 2020*; 12:00 pm, P12N		San Francisco	W 72–70	3–4	22 – Kelly	7 – Tied	5 – Bradley	Haas Pavilion (0); Berkeley, CA
December 19, 2020*; 2:00 pm, P12N		Cal State Northridge	W 87–56	4–4	23 – Foreman	7 – Kelly	8 – Brown	Haas Pavilion (0); Berkeley, CA
December 22, 2020*; 9:00 am, ACCN		at Boston College	Canceled due to COVID-19 issues					Conte Forum; Chestnut Hill, MA
December 22, 2020*; 2:00 pm, P12N		Seattle	W 70–65	5–4	17 – Betley	11 – Kelly	4 – Foreman	Haas Pavilion (0); Berkeley, CA
December 31, 2020; 7:00 pm, P12N		at No. 21 Oregon	L 69–82	5–5 (0–3)	21 – Bradley	7 – Tied	4 – Brown	Matthew Knight Arena (0); Eugene, OR
January 2, 2021; 3:00 pm, P12N		at Oregon State	L 64–73	5–6 (0–4)	12 – Tied	9 – Thiemann	5 – Brown	Gill Coliseum (0); Corvallis, OR
January 7, 2021; 7:00 pm, P12N		Washington State	L 61–70	5–7 (0–5)	11 – Kelly	5 – Tied	4 – Tied	Haas Pavilion (0); Berkeley, CA
January 9, 2021; 12:00 pm, P12N		Washington	W 84–78	6–7 (1–5)	22 – Kelly	6 – Anticevich	5 – Tied	Haas Pavilion (0); Berkeley, CA
January 14, 2021; 12:00 pm, P12N		at Colorado	L 60–89	6–8 (1–6)	16 – Kelly	4 – Tied	2 – Tied	CU Events Center (0); Boulder, CO
January 16, 2021; 7:00 pm, ESPNU		at Utah	W 72–63	7–8 (2–6)	14 – Anticevich	9 – Kelly	5 – Brown	Jon M. Huntsman Center (0); Salt Lake City, UT
January 21, 2021; 6:00 pm, ESPNU		UCLA	L 57–61	7–9 (2–7)	21 – Anticevich	7 – Betley	3 – Anticevich	Haas Pavilion (0); Berkeley, CA
January 23, 2021; 5:00 pm, P12N		USC	L 68–76	7–10 (2–8)	15 – Tied	7 – Brown	3 – Tied	Haas Pavilion (0); Berkeley, CA
January 28, 2021; 8:00 pm, FS1		at Arizona State	L 68–72	7–11 (2–9)	26 – Bradley	13 – Kelly	4 – Celestine	Desert Financial Arena (0); Tempe, AZ
January 30, 2021; 2:00 pm, P12N		at Arizona	L 50–71	7–12 (2–10)	21 – Bradley	5 – Betley	2 – Bowser	McKale Center (0); Tucson, AZ
February 4, 2021; 6:00 pm, ESPN2		Stanford	L 55–70	7–13 (2–11)	24 – Bradley	7 – Kelly	4 – Bradley	Haas Pavilion (0); Berkeley, CA
February 7, 2021; 7:00 pm, FS1		at Stanford	L 70–76	7–14 (2–12)	15 – Bradley	9 – Kelly	4 – Brown	Maples Pavilion (1); Stanford, CA
February 11, 2021; 3:00 pm, P12N		Utah	L 75–76	7–15 (2–13)	20 – Bradley	8 – Anticevich	2 – Tied	Haas Pavilion (0); Berkeley, CA
February 13, 2021; 7:00 pm, ESPNU		Colorado	W 71–62	8–15 (3–13)	28 – Bradley	10 – Kelly	4 – Brown	Haas Pavilion (0); Berkeley, CA
February 18, 2021; 7:30 pm, P12N		at Washington State	L 51–82	8–16 (3–14)	16 – Bradley	5 – Tied	3 – Tied	Beasley Coliseum (200); Pullman, WA
February 20, 2021; 7:00 pm, ESPNU		at Washington	L 51–62	8–17 (3–15)	13 – Bradley	12 – Kelly	2 – Hyder	Alaska Airlines Arena (0); Seattle, WA
February 25, 2021; 7:00 pm, P12N		Oregon State	L 57–59	8–18 (3–16)	20 – Bradley	6 – Celestine	3 – Tied	Haas Pavilion (0); Berkeley, CA
February 27, 2021; 1:00 pm, P12N		Oregon	L 63–74	8–19 (3–17)	13 – Betley	6 – Tied	4 – Tied	Haas Pavilion (0); Berkeley, CA
Pac-12 tournament
March 10, 2021; 7:00 pm, P12N	(11)	vs. (6) Stanford; First round	W 76–58	9–19	19 – Bradley	9 – Kelly	6 – Bradley	T-Mobile Arena (0); Paradise, NV
March 11, 2021; 8:30 pm, ESPN	(11)	vs. (3) No. 23 Colorado; Quarterfinals	L 58–61	9–20	11 – Anticevich	6 – Anticevich	4 – Brown	T-Mobile Arena (0); Paradise, NV
*Non-conference game. ^{#}Rankings from AP Poll. (#) Tournament seedings in parentheses. All times are in Pacific Time.
