= 2020–21 Oregon State Beavers men's basketball team =

American college basketball season

2020–21 Oregon State Beavers men's basketball

Pac-12 tournament champions

NCAA tournament, Elite Eight
- Conference: Pac-12 Conference

Ranking
- Coaches: No. 20
- Record: 20–13 (10–10 Pac-12)
- Head coach: Wayne Tinkle (7th season)
- Associate head coach: Kerry Rupp (7th season)
- Assistant coaches: Stephen Thompson (7th season); Marlon Stewart (2nd season)
- Home arena: Gill Coliseum

2020–21 Pac-12 Conference men's basketball standings
	Conf.				Overall
Team	W		L	PCT	W		L	PCT
Oregon	14	–	4	.778	21	–	7	.750
No. 23 USC	15	–	5	.750	25	–	8	.758
No. 22 Colorado	14	–	6	.700	23	–	9	.719
UCLA	13	–	6	.684	22	–	10	.688
Arizona*	11	–	9	.550	17	–	9	.654
Oregon State †	10	–	10	.500	20	–	13	.606
Stanford	10	–	10	.500	14	–	13	.519
Utah	8	–	11	.421	12	–	13	.480
Arizona State	7	–	10	.412	11	–	14	.440
Washington State	7	–	12	.368	14	–	13	.519
Washington	4	–	16	.200	5	–	21	.192
California	3	–	17	.150	9	–	20	.310
† Conference tournament winner *Ineligible for the conference and NCAA tournaments due to self-imposed postseason ban. Rankings from AP poll

The 2020–21 Oregon State Beavers men's basketball team represented Oregon State University in the 2020–21 NCAA Division I men's basketball season. The Beavers were led by seventh-year head coach Wayne Tinkle, and played their home games at Gill Coliseum in Corvallis, Oregon as members of the Pac-12 Conference.

Despite being picked to finish last in the Pac-12 standings in preseason media polls, the Beavers finished tied for sixth in conference play and received a 5-seed in the 2021 Pac-12 tournament due to Arizona's self-imposed ban. Despite the Beavers' outperforming of low expectations, the consensus among analysts entering the Pac-12 tournament was that OSU would not receive an at-large bid to the upcoming NCAA tournament, and thus needed to win the conference tournament to make the field as an automatic qualifier. The Beavers proceeded to defeat 4-seed UCLA in overtime, top-seed and rival Oregon, and 3-seed Colorado in succession to win their first Pac-12 tournament title in school history and guarantee just their second NCAA tournament berth since 1990.

Seeded 12th in the Midwest region in the 2021 NCAA tournament, the Beavers would trail for less than five combined minutes in upset wins over 5th-seeded Tennessee and 4th-seeded Oklahoma State to advance to the Sweet Sixteen. The wins were Oregon State's first in the NCAA tournament since advancing to the Elite Eight in 1982. The Beavers next overcame a slow start to defeat 8-seed Loyola-Chicago and advance to the Elite Eight, matching their 1982 run. Over their six-game postseason winning streak dating back to the Pac-12 tournament, the Beavers were not favored in a single game. They became just the second ever 12-seed to advance to the Elite Eight since the tournament expanded to 64 teams in 1985.

Facing the 2-seed Houston Cougars in the Midwest regional final, the Beavers rallied from a 17-point second half deficit to tie the game with under four minutes remaining. Houston would prevail, 67–61, to end Oregon State's Cinderella run.

== Previous season ==
The 2019–20 Beavers finished the 2019–20 season 18–13, 7–11 in Pac-12 play to finish in a three-way tie for eighth place. They defeated Utah in the first round of the Pac-12 tournament and were set to take on rival Oregon in the quarterfinals, before the remainder of the Pac-12 Tournament was cancelled amid the COVID-19 pandemic.

== Off-season ==
=== Departures ===
Name	Num	Pos.	Height	Weight	Year	Hometown	Reason for departure
Sean Miller-Moore	1	G	6'5"	200	Junior	Toronto, ON	Graduate transferred to Grand Canyon
Tres Tinkle	3	F	6'7"	225	RS senior	Missoula, MT	Graduated
Antoine Vernon	13	G	6'0"	175	Sophomore	Hamilton, ON	Transferred to St. Francis Xavier
Payton Dastrup	15	C	6'10"	240	RS junior	Mesa, AZ	Transferred to Benedictine at Mesa
Kylor Kelley	24	F	7'0"	215	RS senior	Gervais, OR	Graduated

=== Incoming transfers ===
Name	Num	Pos.	Height	Weight	Year	Hometown	Previous school
Maurice Calloo	1	F	6'10"		Junior	Windsor, ON	Junior college transferred from Indian Hills CC
Warith Alatishe	10	F	6'7"	200	Junior	Houston, TX	Transferred from Nicholls
Rodrigue Andela	35	F	6'8"	230	RS junior	Cameroon	Junior college transferred from Kilgore College
Tariq Silver	55	G	6'5"	200	RS junior	Clarksville, TN	Junior college transferred from Tallahassee CC

=== 2020 recruiting class ===
College recruiting
Name	Hometown	School	Height	Weight	Commit date
Isaiah Johnson; PF	Torrance, CA	Bishop Montgomery High School	6 ft 6 in (1.98 m)	200 lb (91 kg)	Oct 14, 2019
Isaiah Johnson; PF	Recruit ratings: Scout: Rivals: 247Sports: ESPN: (0)				
Overall recruit ranking:
Note: In many cases, Scout, Rivals, 247Sports, On3, and ESPN may conflict in their listings of height and weight.; In these cases, the average was taken. ESPN grades are on a 100-point scale.; Sources: "2020 Basketball Player Commits". ESPN.; "2020 Team Ranking". Rivals.

=== 2021 recruiting class ===
College recruiting (2021)
Name	Hometown	School	Height	Weight	Commit date
Dashawn Davis; SG	Bronx, NY	Trinity Community College	6 ft 3 in (1.91 m)	180 lb (82 kg)	Jul 23, 2020
Dashawn Davis; SG	Recruit ratings: Scout: Rivals: 247Sports: ESPN: (JC)				
Overall recruit ranking:
Note: In many cases, Scout, Rivals, 247Sports, On3, and ESPN may conflict in their listings of height and weight.; In these cases, the average was taken. ESPN grades are on a 100-point scale.; Sources: "2021 Basketball Player Commits". ESPN.; "2021 Team Ranking". Rivals.

== Roster ==
2020–21 Oregon State Beavers men's basketball team
Players
Coaches

Pos.	#	Name	Height	Weight	Year	Previous school	Hometown
G	0	Gianni Hunt	6 ft 3 in (1.91 m)	180 lb (82 kg)	So	Bishop Montgomery HS	Lakewood, California
F	1	Maurice Calloo	6 ft 10 in (2.08 m)	220 lb (100 kg)	Jr	Indian Hills CC	Windsor, Ontario
G	2	Jarod Lucas	6 ft 3 in (1.91 m)	195 lb (88 kg)	So	Los Altos HS	Hacienda Heights, California
G	5	Ethan Thompson	6 ft 5 in (1.96 m)	195 lb (88 kg)	Sr	Bishop Montgomery HS	Los Angeles, California
F	10	Warith Alatishe	6 ft 7 in (2.01 m)	200 lb (91 kg)	Jr	Nicholls	Houston, Texas
G	11	Zach Reichle	6 ft 5 in (1.96 m)	205 lb (93 kg)	Sr	Wilsonville HS	Wilsonville, Oregon
C	12	Roman Silva	7 ft 1 in (2.16 m)	265 lb (120 kg)	Sr	San Bernardino Valley College	Rancho Cucamonga, California
G	22	Julien Franklin	6 ft 7 in (2.01 m)	200 lb (91 kg)	RS Fr	Villa Park HS	Brea, California
F	23	Joey Potts (W)	6 ft 10 in (2.08 m)	200 lb (91 kg)	RS Jr	College of Marin	Petaluma, California
F	24	Isaiah Johnson	6 ft 6 in (1.98 m)	209 lb (95 kg)	Fr	Bishop Montgomery HS	Torrance, California
F	34	Rodrigue Andela	6 ft 8 in (2.03 m)	248 lb (112 kg)	Jr	Kilgore College	Yaoundé, Cameroon
F	35	DeAron Tucker	6 ft 10 in (2.08 m)	240 lb (109 kg)	So	Legacy Early College	Dallas, Texas
G	55	Tariq Silver	6 ft 5 in (1.96 m)	200 lb (91 kg)	RS Jr	Tallahassee CC	Clarksville, Tennessee

Head coach

- Wayne Tinkle (Montana)

Assistant coach(es)

- Kerry Rupp (Southern Utah)
- Stephen Thompson (Syracuse)
- Marlon Stewart (North Dakota)

Legend

- (C) Team captain
- (S) Suspended
- (I) Ineligible
- (W) Walk-on
- Injured
- Current redshirt

Roster

== Schedule and results ==
Date time, TV	Rank^{#}	Opponent^{#}	Result	Record	High points	High rebounds	High assists	Site (attendance) city, state
Regular season
November 25, 2020*; 4:00 pm, P12N		California (Note: This game was arranged last-minute due to Colorado State dropping out due to COVID-19-related concerns. Due to these emergency circumstances, despite California being a member of the Pac-12, this game was considered a non-conference game and did not count towards the conference standings.)	W 71–63	1–0	16 – Alatishe	11 – Andela	6 – Thompson	Gill Coliseum (0); Corvallis, OR
November 27, 2020*; 10:00 am, P12N		Northwest	W 114–42	2–0	17 – Thompson	9 – Alatishe	5 – Reichle	Gill Coliseum (0); Corvallis, OR
December 2, 2020; 7:00 pm, P12N		at Washington State	L 55–59	2–1 (0–1)	12 – Reichle	10 – Alatishe	7 – Thompson	Beasley Coliseum (0); Pullman, WA
December 6, 2020*; 1:00 pm, P12N		Wyoming	L 73–76	2–2	20 – Thompson	12 – Alatishe	4 – Hunt	Gill Coliseum (0); Corvallis, OR
December 10, 2020*; 5:00 pm, P12N		Portland	L 86–87 ^{OT}	2–3	31 – Thompson	11 – Alatishe	7 – Reichle	Gill Coliseum (0); Corvallis, OR
December 16, 2020*; 2:00 pm, P12N		UTSA	W 73–61	3–3	22 – Thompson	6 – Tied	4 – Reichle	Gill Coliseum (0); Corvallis, OR
December 22, 2020*; 6:00 pm, P12N		Portland State	W 67–62	4–3	15 – Reichle	11 – Alatishe	4 – Reichle	Gill Coliseum (0); Corvallis, OR
January 2, 2021; 3:00 pm, P12N		California	W 73–64	5–3 (1–1)	16 – Thompson	11 – Andela	6 – Hunt	Gill Coliseum (0); Corvallis, OR
January 4, 2021; 12:00 pm, P12N		Stanford	L 71–81	5–4 (1–2)	22 – Lucas	10 – Alatishe	7 – Thompson	Gill Coliseum (0); Corvallis, OR
January 14, 2021; 8:00 pm, FS1		Arizona	L 64–98	5–5 (1–3)	13 – Thompson	4 – Tied	5 – Thompson	Gill Coliseum (0); Corvallis, OR
January 16, 2021; 4:00 pm, P12N		Arizona State	W 80–79	6–5 (2–3)	18 – Lucas	8 – Alatishe	5 – Tied	Gill Coliseum (0); Corvallis, OR
January 19, 2021; 4:00 pm, ESPN2		USC	W 58–56	7–5 (3–3)	13 – Tied	4 – Tied	6 – Reichle	Gill Coliseum (0); Corvallis, OR
January 23, 2021; 7:30 pm, P12N		at No. 21 Oregon; Rivalry	W 75–64	8–5 (4–3)	19 – Thompson	16 – Alatishe	4 – Reichle	Matthew Knight Arena (0); Eugene, OR
January 28, 2021; 2:00 pm, ESPNU		at USC	L 62–75	8–6 (4–4)	20 – Thompson	7 – Thompson	5 – Thompson	Galen Center (0); Los Angeles, CA
January 30, 2021; 4:00 pm, P12N		at No. 23 UCLA	L 52–57	8–7 (4–5)	16 – Thompson	9 – Alatishe	5 – Thompson	Pauley Pavilion (0); Los Angeles, CA
February 4, 2021; 6:00 pm, P12N		Washington	W 91–71	9–7 (5–5)	17 – Reichle	11 – Alatishe	8 – Reichle	Gill Coliseum (0); Corvallis, OR
February 6, 2021; 3:00 pm, P12N		Washington State	W 68–66	10–7 (6–5)	12 – Tied	7 – Alatishe	4 – Hunt	Gill Coliseum (0); Corvallis, OR
February 8, 2021; 4:00 pm, P12N		at Colorado	L 49–78	10–8 (6–6)	10 – Thompson	6 – Alatishe	3 – Reichle	CU Events Center (61); Boulder, CO
February 11, 2021; 5:00 pm, P12N		at Arizona	L 61–70	10–9 (6–7)	13 – Tied	6 – Alatishe	3 – Reichle	McKale Center (0); Tucson, AZ
February 14, 2021; 4:00 pm, ESPN2		at Arizona State	L 73–75	10–10 (6–8)	18 – Thompson	10 – Alatishe	4 – Tied	Desert Financial Arena (0); Tempe, AZ
February 18, 2021; 5:30 pm, P12N		Utah	W 74–56	11–10 (7–8)	25 – Thompson	9 – Alatishe	8 – Thompson	Gill Coliseum (0); Corvallis, OR
February 20, 2021; 5:00 pm, ESPNU		Colorado	L 57–61	11–11 (7–9)	18 – Thompson	10 – Alatishe	7 – Thompson	Gill Coliseum (0); Corvallis, OR
February 25, 2021; 7:00 pm, P12N		at California	W 59–57	12–11 (8–9)	15 – Silva	11 – Alatishe	3 – Thompson	Haas Pavilion (0); Berkeley, CA
February 27, 2021; 3:30 pm, P12N		at Stanford	W 73–62	13–11 (9–9)	26 – Lucas	8 – Alatishe	3 – Thompson	Maples Pavilion (1); Stanford, CA
March 3, 2021; 4:00 pm, ESPNU		at Utah	W 75–70	14–11 (10–9)	17 – Hunt	10 – Alatishe	4 – Alatishe	Jon M. Huntsman Center (0); Salt Lake City, UT
March 7, 2021; 5:00 pm, FS1		Oregon; Rivalry	L 67–80	14–12 (10–10)	16 – Thompson	7 – Alatishe	4 – Reichle	Gill Coliseum (0); Corvallis, OR
Pac-12 tournament
March 11, 2021; 2:30 pm, P12N	(5)	vs. (4) UCLA; Quarterfinals	W 83–79 ^{OT}	15–12	22 – Alatishe	10 – Tied	5 – Hunt	T-Mobile Arena (0); Paradise, NV
March 12, 2021; 5:30 pm, P12N	(5)	vs. (1) Oregon; Semifinals/Rivalry	W 75–64	16–12	16 – Thompson	12 – Alatishe	4 – Tied	T-Mobile Arena (0); Paradise, NV
March 13, 2021; 7:30 pm, ESPN	(5)	vs. (3) No. 23 Colorado; Championship	W 70–68	17–12	15 – Calloo	7 – Alatishe	4 – Thompson	T-Mobile Arena (0); Paradise, NV
NCAA tournament
March 19, 2021; 1:30 pm, TNT	(12 MW)	vs. (5 MW) Tennessee; First Round	W 70–56	18–12	16 – Silva	10 – Thompson	6 – Thompson	Bankers Life Fieldhouse (2,157); Indianapolis, IN
March 21, 2021; 6:40 pm, TBS	(12 MW)	vs. (4 MW) No. 11 Oklahoma State; Second Round	W 80–70	19–12	26 – Thompson	12 – Tied	2 – Tied	Hinkle Fieldhouse (1,038); Indianapolis, IN
March 27, 2021; 11:40 am, CBS	(12 MW)	vs. (8 MW) No. 17 Loyola–Chicago; Sweet Sixteen	W 65–58	20–12	22 – Thompson	11 – Alatishe	4 – Tied	Bankers Life Fieldhouse (3,639); Indianapolis, IN
March 29, 2021; 4:15 pm, CBS	(12 MW)	vs. (2 MW) No. 6 Houston; Elite Eight	L 61–67	20–13	13 – Calloo	7 – Thompson	6 – Thompson	Lucas Oil Stadium (7,519); Indianapolis, IN
*Non-conference game. ^{#}Rankings from AP Poll. (#) Tournament seedings in parentheses. All times are in Pacific Time.
