= 2020–21 Arizona State Sun Devils men's basketball team =

American college basketball season

2020–21 Arizona State Sun Devils men's basketball
- Conference: Pac-12 Conference
- Record: 11–14 (7–10 Pac–12)
- Head coach: Bobby Hurley (6th season)
- Assistant coaches: Rashon Burno; Ben Wood; Anthony Coleman
- Home arena: Desert Financial Arena

2020–21 Pac-12 Conference men's basketball standings
	Conf.				Overall
Team	W		L	PCT	W		L	PCT
Oregon	14	–	4	.778	21	–	7	.750
No. 23 USC	15	–	5	.750	25	–	8	.758
No. 22 Colorado	14	–	6	.700	23	–	9	.719
UCLA	13	–	6	.684	22	–	10	.688
Arizona*	11	–	9	.550	17	–	9	.654
Oregon State †	10	–	10	.500	20	–	13	.606
Stanford	10	–	10	.500	14	–	13	.519
Utah	8	–	11	.421	12	–	13	.480
Arizona State	7	–	10	.412	11	–	14	.440
Washington State	7	–	12	.368	14	–	13	.519
Washington	4	–	16	.200	5	–	21	.192
California	3	–	17	.150	9	–	20	.310
† Conference tournament winner *Ineligible for the conference and NCAA tournaments due to self-imposed postseason ban. Rankings from AP poll

The 2020–21 Arizona State Sun Devils men's basketball team represented Arizona State University during the 2020–21 NCAA Division I men's basketball season. The Sun Devils are led by sixth-year head coach Bobby Hurley, and played their home games at Desert Financial Arena in Tempe, Arizona as members of the Pac–12 Conference.

== Previous season ==
The Sun Devils finished the season 20–11, 11–7 in Pac-12 play to finish in a tie for third place. They were set to take on Washington State in the quarterfinals of the Pac-12 tournament. However, the remainder of the tournament, and all other postseason tournaments, were cancelled amid the COVID-19 pandemic.

== Off-season ==
=== Departures ===
Name	Num.	Pos.	Height	Weight	Year	Hometown	Reason for departure
Mickey Mitchell	00	F	6'7"	225	RS Senior	Orlando, FL	Graduated
Rob Edwards	2	G	6'5"	205	Senior	Detroit, MI	Graduated
Elias Valtonen	5	G	6'7"	195	Sophomore	Eura, Finland	Signed to play professional in Germany with Tigers Tübingen
Khalid Thomas	20	F	6'9"	210	Junior	Portland, OR	Transferred to Portland State
Andre Allen	22	F	6'9"	210	Junior	Los Angeles, CA	Transferred to Southern
Romello White	23	F	6'8"	235	RS Junior	Atlanta, GA	Graduate transferred to Ole Miss
Grant Fogerty	25	G	5'11"	175	Senior	Scottsdale, AZ	Walk-on; graduated

=== Incoming transfers ===
Name	Num.	Pos.	Height	Weight	Year	Previous school	Notes
Holland Woods	0	G	6'1"	180	Senior	Phoenix, AZ	Transferred from Portland State. Will be eligible to play immediately since Woods graduated from Portland State.
Luther Muhammad	1	G	6'3"	185	Junior	Newark, NJ	Transferred from Ohio State. Under NCAA transfer rules, Muhammad will have to sit out during the 2020–21 season. Will have two years of remaining eligibility.
Chris Osten	21	F	6'9"	210	Junior	Crowley, LA	Junior college transferred from Lee College

=== 2020 recruiting class ===
College recruiting information
Name	Hometown	School	Height	Weight	Commit date
Josh Christopher; SG	Carson, CA	Mayfair (CA)	6 ft 4 in (1.93 m)	205 lb (93 kg)	Apr 13, 2020
Josh Christopher; SG	Recruit ratings: Scout: Rivals: 247Sports: ESPN: (95)				
Marcus Bagley; SF	Phoenix, AZ	Sheldon (CA)	6 ft 7 in (2.01 m)	220 lb (100 kg)	Jul 19, 2019
Marcus Bagley; SF	Recruit ratings: Scout: Rivals: 247Sports: ESPN: (89)				
Pavlo Dziuba; PF	Ukraine	N/A	6 ft 8 in (2.03 m)	235 lb (107 kg)	Jun 24, 2020
Pavlo Dziuba; PF	Recruit ratings: Scout: Rivals: 247Sports: ESPN: (0)				
Overall recruit ranking:
Note: In many cases, Scout, Rivals, 247Sports, On3, and ESPN may conflict in their listings of height and weight.; In these cases, the average was taken. ESPN grades are on a 100-point scale.; Sources: "2020 Team Ranking". Rivals.

=== 2021 Recruiting class ===
College recruiting information (2021)
Name	Hometown	School	Height	Weight	Commit date
Demari Williams; SG	Fulshear, TX	Dream City Christian	6 ft 6 in (1.98 m)	190 lb (86 kg)	Sep 14, 2020
Demari Williams; SG	Recruit ratings: Scout: Rivals: 247Sports: ESPN: (0)				
Will Felton; PF	Raleigh, NC	Hargrave Military Academy	6 ft 9 in (2.06 m)	225 lb (102 kg)	Sep 20, 2020
Will Felton; PF	Recruit ratings: Scout: Rivals: 247Sports: ESPN: (0)				
Justin Rochelin; SG	Northridge, CA	Heritage Christian School	6 ft 5 in (1.96 m)	190 lb (86 kg)	Oct 17, 2020
Justin Rochelin; SG	Recruit ratings: Scout: Rivals: 247Sports: ESPN: (0)				
Jamiya Neal; SF	Phoenix, AZ	Hillcrest Prep	6 ft 6 in (1.98 m)	185 lb (84 kg)	Nov 16, 2020
Jamiya Neal; SF	Recruit ratings: Scout: Rivals: 247Sports: ESPN: (0)				
Overall recruit ranking:
Note: In many cases, Scout, Rivals, 247Sports, On3, and ESPN may conflict in their listings of height and weight.; In these cases, the average was taken. ESPN grades are on a 100-point scale.; Sources: "2021 Team Ranking". Rivals.

== Roster ==
2020–21 Arizona State Sun Devils men's basketball team
Players
Coaches

Pos.	#	Name	Height	Weight	Year	Previous school	Hometown
G	0	Holland Woods	6 ft 1 in (1.85 m)	180 lb (82 kg)	Sr	Portland State	Phoenix, Arizona
G	1	Remy Martin	6 ft 0 in (1.83 m)	175 lb (79 kg)	Sr	Sierra Canyon School	Chatsworth, California
G	2	Luther Muhammad (redshirt)	6 ft 3 in (1.91 m)	185 lb (84 kg)	Jr	Ohio State	Newark, New Jersey
G	3	Caleb Christopher	6 ft 1 in (1.85 m)	180 lb (82 kg)	So	Mayfair HS	Los Angeles, California
F	4	Kimani Lawrence	6 ft 8 in (2.03 m)	210 lb (95 kg)	Sr	New Hampton School	Providence, Rhode Island
G	10	Jaelen House	6 ft 1 in (1.85 m)	160 lb (73 kg)	So	Shadow Mountain HS	Phoenix, Arizona
G	11	Alonzo Verge Jr.	6 ft 2 in (1.88 m)	170 lb (77 kg)	Sr	Moberly Area CC	Chicago, Illinois
G	12	Micah Burno (W)	6 ft 0 in (1.83 m)	180 lb (82 kg)	So	Chaparral HS	Scottsdale, Arizona
G	13	Josh Christopher	6 ft 5 in (1.96 m)	215 lb (98 kg)	Fr	Mayfair HS	Carson, California
G	14	Austin Ronzone (W)	6 ft 1 in (1.85 m)	178 lb (81 kg)	Fr	Bishop O'Dowd HS	Oakland, California
F	15	John Olmsted (W)	6 ft 10 in (2.08 m)	235 lb (107 kg)	So	Morenci HS	Morenci, Arizona
G	20	Cade Ronzone (W)	6 ft 2 in (1.88 m)	180 lb (82 kg)	Fr	Bishop O'Dowd HS	Oakland, California
F	21	Chris Osten	6 ft 9 in (2.06 m)	210 lb (95 kg)	Jr	Lee College	Crowley, Louisiana
F	23	Marcus Bagley	6 ft 8 in (2.03 m)	215 lb (98 kg)	Fr	Sheldon HS	Phoenix, Arizona
F	24	Jalen Graham	6 ft 9 in (2.06 m)	220 lb (100 kg)	So	Mountain Pointe HS	Phoenix, Arizona
G	30	Kyle Feit (W)	6 ft 4 in (1.93 m)	215 lb (98 kg)	RS So	IMG Academy	West Palm Beach, Florida
F	35	Taeshon Cherry	6 ft 8 in (2.03 m)	220 lb (100 kg)	Jr	Foothills Christian HS	El Cajon, California
G	41	Imran Takhar (W)	6 ft 3 in (1.91 m)	195 lb (88 kg)	Sr	Villa Park HS	Orange, California
F	51	Pavlo Dziuba	6 ft 8 in (2.03 m)	225 lb (102 kg)	Fr	FC Barcelona	Kirichkova, Ukraine

Head coach

- Bobby Hurley (Duke)

Assistant coach(es)

- Rashon Burno (DePaul)
- Ben Wood (Connecticut)
- Anthony Coleman (Long Beach State)

Legend

- (C) Team captain
- (S) Suspended
- (I) Ineligible
- (W) Walk-on
- Injured
- Current redshirt

Roster

== Schedule and results ==
Date time, TV	Rank^{#}	Opponent^{#}	Result	Record	High points	High rebounds	High assists	Site (attendance) city, state
Regular season
November 25, 2020*; 5:00 pm, ESPN	No. 18	vs. Rhode Island; 2K Empire Classic semifinal	W 94–88	1–0	26 – Martin	7 – Bagley	5 – Martin	Mohegan Sun Arena (0); Uncasville, CT
November 26, 2020*; 7:30 pm, ESPN	No. 18	vs. No. 3 Villanova; 2K Empire Classic championship	L 74–83	1–1	28 – J. Christopher	7 – Verge	3 – Verge	Mohegan Sun Arena (0); Uncasville, CT
November 29, 2020*; 2:00 pm, P12N	No. 18	Houston Baptist	W 100–77	2–1	21 – Bagley	6 – J. Christopher	4 – Tied	Desert Financial Arena (0); Tempe, AZ
December 3, 2020; 8:00 pm, P12N	No. 25	at California	W 70–62	3–1 (1–0)	22 – Martin	7 – Bagley	5 – Martin	Haas Pavilion (0); Berkeley, CA
December 10, 2020*; 8:00 pm, FS1	No. 23	No. 24 San Diego State	L 68–80	3–2	25 – Verge	7 – Osten	4 – Verge	Desert Financial Arena (0); Tempe, AZ
December 13, 2020*; 2:00 pm, KUTP	No. 23	at Grand Canyon	W 71–70	4–2	31 – Martin	6 – Lawrence	4 – Martin	GCU Arena (354); Phoenix, AZ
December 16, 2020*; 7:00 pm, P12N		UTEP	L 63–76	4–3	24 – J. Christopher	6 – J. Christopher	3 – Verge	Desert Financial Arena (0); Tempe, AZ
December 18, 2020*; TBD, P12N		Incarnate Word	Cancelled					Desert Financial Arena; Tempe, AZ
January 7, 2021; 8:30 pm, ESPN		UCLA	L 75–81 ^{OT}	4–4 (1–1)	25 – Verge	11 – Tied	4 – Tied	Desert Financial Arena (0); Tempe, AZ
January 9, 2021; 5:00 pm, P12N		USC	L 64–73	4–5 (1–2)	18 – Woods	13 – Bagley	4 – Woods	Desert Financial Arena (0); Tempe, AZ
January 14, 2021; 7:00 pm, ESPN/ESPN2		at No. 22 Oregon	Postponed					Matthew Knight Arena; Eugene, OR
January 16, 2021; 4:00 pm, P12N		at Oregon State	L 79–80	4–6 (1–3)	19 – Bagley	7 – Tied	8 – Tied	Gill Coliseum (0); Corvallis, OR
January 21, 2021; 6:00 pm, ESPN		Arizona; Rivalry	L 82–84	4–7 (1–4)	18 – Tied	6 – Tied	6 – Martin	Desert Financial Arena (0); Tempe, AZ
January 25, 2021; 9:00 pm, ESPN2		at Arizona; Rivalry	L 67–80	4–8 (1–5)	24 – Martin	11 – Graham	3 – Tied	McKale Center (0); Tempe, AZ
January 28, 2021; 9:00 pm, FS1		California	W 72–68	5–8 (2–5)	19 – Martin	8 – Lawrence	4 – Bagley	Desert Financial Arena (0); Tempe, AZ
January 30, 2021; 6:00 pm, ESPN2		Stanford	W 79–75	6–8 (3–5)	23 – Martin	5 – Graham	6 – Martin	Desert Financial Arena (0); Tempe, AZ
February 2, 2020; 2:00 pm, P12N		Utah	Postponed					Desert Financial Arena; Tempe, AZ
February 11, 2021; 7:00 pm, ESPN2		Oregon	L 64–75	6–9 (3–6)	30 – Martin	12 – Lawrence	3 – Tied	Desert Financial Arena (0); Tempe, AZ
February 14, 2021; 5:00 pm, ESPN2		Oregon State	W 75–73	7–9 (4–6)	23 – Martin	11 – Graham	4 – Tied	Desert Financial Arena (0); Tempe, AZ
February 17, 2021; 6:00 pm, ESPN2		at No. 17 USC	L 71–89	7–10 (4–7)	30 – Martin	6 – Lawrence	4 – Lawrence	Galen Center (0); Los Angeles, CA
February 20, 2021; 8:00 pm, ESPN2		at UCLA	L 79–80	7–11 (4–8)	25 – Martin	9 – Lawrence	5 – Verge	Pauley Pavilion (0); Los Angeles, CA
February 23, 2021; 7:00 pm, P12N		Washington	W 97–64	8–11 (5–8)	26 – Martin	12 – Lawrence	7 – Verge	Desert Financial Arena (0); Tempe, AZ
February 25, 2021; 5:00 pm, FS1		Washington	W 80–72	9–11 (6–8)	31 – Martin	20 – Lawrence	7 – Verge	Desert Financial Arena (0); Tempe, AZ
February 27, 2021; 7:00 pm, P12N		Washington State	W 77-74 ^{OT}	10–11 (7–8)	23 – Martin	12 – Graham	9 – Verge	Desert Financial Arena (0); Tempe, AZ
March 1, 2021; 1:00 pm, P12N		Washington State	Cancelled due to COVID-19 issues					Desert Financial Arena; Tempe, AZ
March 4, 2021; 7:00 pm, ESPN2		at No. 24 Colorado	L 61–75	10–12 (7–9)	15 – Woods	7 – Tied	3 – House	CU Events Center (84); Boulder, CO
March 6, 2021; 12:00 pm, FS1		at Utah	L 59–98	10–13 (7–10)	13 – Verge	7 – Graham	4 – Martin	Jon M. Huntsman Center (0); Salt Lake City, UT
Pac-12 tournament
March 10, 2021; 2:00 pm, P12N	(8)	vs. (9) Washington State; First round	W 64–59	11–13	26 – Verge	6 – Tied	5 – House	T-Mobile Arena (0); Paradise, NV
March 11, 2021; 12:30 pm, P12N	(8)	vs. (1) Oregon; Quarterfinals	L 73–91	11–14	28 – Verge	8 – Verge	5 – Martin	T-Mobile Arena (0); Paradise, NV
*Non-conference game. ^{#}Rankings from AP Poll. (#) Tournament seedings in parentheses. All times are in Mountain Time.

== Rankings ==
Ranking movements Legend: ██ Increase in ranking ██ Decrease in ranking — = Not ranked RV = Received votes
	Week																	
Poll	Pre	1	2	3	4	5	6	7	8	9	10	11	12	13	14	15	16	Final
AP	18	25	23	RV	—	—	—	—	—	—	—	—	—	—	—	—	—	Not released
Coaches	17	17^	23	RV	—	—	—	—	—	—	—	—	—	—	—	—	—	—

*AP does not release post-NCAA Tournament rankings.
^Coaches did not release a Week 1 poll.
