= 2021 Pac-12 Conference men's basketball tournament =

- Classification: Division I
- Season: 2020–21
- Teams: 11
- Site: T-Mobile Arena; Paradise, Nevada
- Champions: Oregon State Beavers (1st title)
- Winning coach: Wayne Tinkle (1st title)
- MVP: Warith Alatishe (Oregon State)
- Top scorer: Alonzo Verge Jr. (Arizona State) (54 points)
- Television: Pac-12 Network; ESPN

2020–21 Pac-12 Conference men's basketball standings
	Conf.				Overall
Team	W		L	PCT	W		L	PCT
Oregon	14	–	4	.778	21	–	7	.750
No. 23 USC	15	–	5	.750	25	–	8	.758
No. 22 Colorado	14	–	6	.700	23	–	9	.719
UCLA	13	–	6	.684	22	–	10	.688
Arizona*	11	–	9	.550	17	–	9	.654
Oregon State †	10	–	10	.500	20	–	13	.606
Stanford	10	–	10	.500	14	–	13	.519
Utah	8	–	11	.421	12	–	13	.480
Arizona State	7	–	10	.412	11	–	14	.440
Washington State	7	–	12	.368	14	–	13	.519
Washington	4	–	16	.200	5	–	21	.192
California	3	–	17	.150	9	–	20	.310
† Conference tournament winner *Ineligible for the conference and NCAA tournaments due to self-imposed postseason ban. Rankings from AP poll

The 2021 Pac-12 Conference men's basketball tournament was a postseason men's basketball tournament for the Pac-12 Conference, which was played March 10–13, 2021, at T-Mobile Arena on the Las Vegas Strip in Paradise, Nevada. The winner was Oregon State, which was the first for the Beavers in the history of the tournament. They received the conference's automatic bid to the 2021 NCAA Division I men's basketball tournament. The 2020 Tournament had been cancelled after the first round due to the COVID-19 pandemic. The 2021 tournament was played, but with only family of student-athletes as spectators in attendance.

== Seeds ==
Eleven of the 12 Pac-12 teams competed in the tournament. The Arizona Wildcats did not compete in the tournament; the university self-imposed a postseason ban for the 2020-21 season due to ongoing NCAA investigations into corruption within the program. Teams were seeded by record within the conference, with tiebreakers in place to seed teams with identical conference records. The top five teams received a bye to the quarterfinals.

Seed	School	Conference	Overall	Tiebreak 1	Tiebreak 2
1	Oregon†#	14–4	19–5		
2	USC#	15–5	21–6		
3	Colorado#	14–6	20–7		
4	UCLA#	13–6	17–8		
5	Oregon State#	10–10	14–12	1–1 vs. Stanford	1–1 vs. Oregon
6	Stanford	10–10	14–12	1–1 vs. Oregon State	0–2 vs. Oregon
7	Utah	8–11	11–12		
8	Arizona State	7–10	10–13		
9	Washington State	7–12	14–12		
10	Washington	4–16	5–20		
11	California	3–17	8–19		
† – Pac-12 Conference regular season champions # – Received a first round bye in the conference tournament.

== Schedule ==
Game	Time	Matchup	Score	Television	Attendance
First round – Wednesday, March 10
1	1:00 pm	No. 8 Arizona State vs. No. 9 Washington State	64–59	Pac-12 Network	N/A^
2	4:00 pm	No. 7 Utah vs. No. 10 Washington	98–95	Pac-12 Network	N/A^
3	7:00 pm	No. 6 Stanford vs. No. 11 California	58–76	Pac-12 Network	N/A^
Quarterfinals – Thursday, March 11
4	11:30 am	No. 1 Oregon vs. No. 8 Arizona State	91–73	Pac-12 Network	N/A
5	2:30 pm	No. 4 UCLA vs. No. 5 Oregon State	79–83 ^{OT}	Pac-12 Network	N/A
6	5:30 pm	No. 2 USC vs. No. 7 Utah	91–85 ^{2OT}	Pac-12 Network	N/A
7	8:30 pm	No. 3 Colorado vs. No. 11 California	61–58	ESPN	N/A
Semifinals – Friday, March 12
8	5:30 pm	No. 1 Oregon vs. No. 5 Oregon State	64–75	Pac-12 Network	N/A
9	8:30 pm	No. 2 USC vs. No. 3 Colorado	70–72	ESPN	N/A
Championship – Saturday, March 13
10	7:30 pm	No. 3 Colorado vs. No. 5 Oregon State	68–70	ESPN	N/A
Game times in PT. Rankings denote tournament seed.

^According to the Pac-12, family members were allowed to attend, but the general public was not allowed. As a result, the Pac-12 has not released official attendance numbers.

== Bracket ==
First round Wednesday, March 10
8	Arizona State	64
9	Washington State	59
7	Utah	98
10	Washington	95
6	Stanford	58
11	California	76

Quarterfinals; Thursday, March 11
1	Oregon	91
8	Arizona State	73
4	UCLA	79
5	Oregon State	83*
2	#24 USC	91**
7	Utah	85
3	#23 Colorado	61
11	California	58

Semifinals; Friday, March 12
1	Oregon	64
5	Oregon State	75
2	#24 USC	70
3	#23 Colorado	72

Championship; Saturday, March 13
5	Oregon State	70
3	#23 Colorado	68

* denotes overtime period ** denotes double overtime period

== Game statistics ==
=== First round ===
Pac-12 Network

March 10
1:00 pm PST

No. 8 Arizona State 64, No. 9 Washington State 59
Scoring by half: 25-24, 39-35
Pts: Verge Jr., 26; Rebs: 3 tied, 6 Asts: House, 6	Pts: Bonton, 19; Rebs: Kunc, 9 Asts: 2 tied, 4

T-Mobile Arena
Paradise, NV
Referees: Chris Rastatter, Deldre Carr, Greg Nixon

Pac-12 Network

March 10
4:00 pm PST

No. 7 Utah 98, No. 10 Washington 95
Scoring by half: 47-35, 51-60
Pts: Allen, 24; Rebs: Allen, 11; Asts: 2 tied, 4	Pts: Green, 31; Rebs: 2 tied, 6 Asts: Green, 7

T-Mobile Arena
Paradise, NV
Referees: Tony Padilla, Michael Irving, Michael Greenstein

Pac-12 Network

March 10
7:00 pm PST

No. 6 Stanford 58, No. 11 California 76
Scoring by half: 29-35, 29-41
Pts: Delaire, 14; Rebs: Kisunas, 7 Asts: O'Connell, 3	Pts: Bradley, 19; Rebs: Kelly, 9 Asts: Bradley, 6

T-Mobile Arena
Paradise, NV
Referees: Randy McCall, Verne Harris, Mike Reed

=== Quarterfinals ===
Pac-12 Network

March 11
11:30 am PST

No. 1 Oregon 91, No. 8 Arizona State 73
Scoring by half: 35-27, 56-46
Pts: Verge Jr., 28; Rebs: Verge Jr., 8 Asts: Martin, 5	Pts: Figueroa, 21; Rebs: Richardson, 7 Asts: Richardson, 9

T-Mobile Arena
Paradise, NV
Referees: Mike Reed, Michael Irving, Kevin Brill

Pac-12 Network

March 11
2:30 pm PST

No. 4 UCLA 79, No. 5 Oregon State 83 (OT)
Scoring by half: 34-24, 36-46 Overtime: 9-13
Pts: Bernard, 19; Rebs: Bernard, 10; Asts: Campbell, 5	Pts: Alatishe, 22; Rebs: 2 tied, 10; Asts: Hunt, 5

T-Mobile Arena
Paradise, NV
Referees: Randy McCall, Michael Greenstein, Mike Scyphers

Pac-12 Network

March 11
5:30 pm PST

No. 2 USC 91, No. 7 Utah 85 (OT)
Scoring by half: 34-29, 37-42 Overtime: 20-14
Pts: E. Mobley, 26; Rebs: E. Mobley, 9 Asts: 2 tied, 3	Pts: Allen, 20; Rebs: Allen, 13; Asts: Allen, 3

T-Mobile Arena
Paradise, NV
Referees: Chris Rastatter, Verne Harris, Frank Harvey III

ESPN

March 11
8:30 pm PST

No. 3 Colorado 61, No. 11 California 58
Scoring by half: 24-20, 37-38
Pts: Battey, 15; Rebs: Walker, 6 Asts: Wright IV, 3	Pts: Anticevich, 11; Rebs: Anticevich, 6 Asts: Brown, 4

T-Mobile Arena
Paradise, NV
Referees: Tony Padilla, Deldre Carr, Greg Nixon

=== Semifinals ===
Pac-12 Network

March 12
5:30 pm PST

No. 1 Oregon 64, No. 5 Oregon State 75
Scoring by half: 28-38, 36-37
Pts: Thompson, 16; Rebs: Alatishe, 12; Asts: 2 tied, 4	Pts: 3 tied, 14; Rebs: Richardson, 7 Asts: Richardson, 6

T-Mobile Arena
Paradise, NV
Referees: Verne Harris, Tony Padilla, Chris Rastatter

ESPN

March 12
8:30 pm PST

No. 2 USC 70, No. 3 Colorado 72
Scoring by half: 30-39, 40-33
Pts: E. Mobley, 26; Rebs: E. Mobley, 9 Asts: Eaddy, 5	Pts: Wright IV, 24; Rebs: Horne, 7 Asts: Wright IV, 4

T-Mobile Arena
Paradise, NV
Referees: Mike Reed, Deldre Carr, Michael Greenstein

=== Championship ===
ESPN

March 13
7:30 pm PST

No. 5 Oregon State 70, No. 3 Colorado 68
Scoring by half: 33-28, 37-40
Pts: Calloo, 15; Rebs: Alatishe, 7 Asts: Thompson, 4	Pts: Wright IV, 18; Rebs: Battey, 8 Asts: Wright IV, 7

T-Mobile Arena
Paradise, NV
Referees: Verne Harris, Tony Padilla, Chris Rastatter

== Awards and honors ==
=== Team and tournament leaders ===
Team	Points		Rebounds		Assists		Steals		Blocks		Minutes	
Arizona	—	―	―	―	―	―	―	―	―	―	―	―
Arizona State	Verge Jr.	54	Verge Jr.	14	2 tied	7	House	6	3 tied	1	Martin	72
California	Bradley	29	2 tied	11	Brown	7	2 tied	2	Kelly	2	Bradley	67
Colorado	Wright IV	52	Battey	19	Wright IV	14	5 tied	2	Walton	2	Wright IV	103
Oregon	Figueroa	35	Richardson	14	Richardson	15	Omoruyi	7	2 tied	2	Richardson	75
Oregon State	2 tied	42	Alatishe	29	Thompson	11	Thompson	4	2 tied	2	Lucas	104
Stanford	Delaire	14	Kisunas	7	O'Connell	3	Wills	3	2 tied	1	Wills	32
UCLA	Bernard	19	Bernard	10	Campbell	5	Singleton	2	Riley	3	Campbell	43
USC	E. Mobley	52	E. Mobley	18	Eaddy	8	Eaddy	3	E. Mobley	10	2 tied	78
Utah	Allen	44	Allen	24	Allen	7	Allen	3	2 tied	2	Allen	87
Washington	Green	31	2 tied	6	Green	7	Bajema	3	2 tied	1	2 tied	37
Washington State	Bonton	19	Kunc	9	2 tied	4	Bonton	2	3 tied	1	Bonton	39

=== All-Tournament Team ===
Name	Pos.	Height	Weight	Year	Team
Warith Alatishe	F	6'7"	220	Jr.	Oregon State
Evan Mobley	F	7'0"	210	Fr.	USC
Evan Battey	F	6'8"	260	Jr.	Colorado
McKinley Wright IV	G	6'0"	200	Sr.	Colorado
Jared Lucas	G	6'3"	205	So.	Oregon State
Ethan Thompson	G	6'5"	195	Sr.	Oregon State

== Tournament notes ==
- Five teams were extended invitations to the 2021 NCAA tournament: Colorado, Oregon, Oregon State, UCLA, and USC. The five bids marks the most for the Conference since securing a record seven in 2015-16. Oregon State was not expected to be invited to the tournament, and changed the number of predicted bids of the Pac-12 from four to five. The team first out originally predicted in the field was Louisville.
- No teams from the Pac-12 were invited to the 2021 National Invitation Tournament, which was reduced in size.
- In the NCAA tournament, UCLA won the 11 seed play-in game, and then all five teams advanced to the round of 32 on the opening weekend. Four teams advanced to round of sixteen. Three teams advanced to the round of eight: Oregon State, UCLA, and USC. USC and Oregon played each other for the final Elite 8 spot. UCLA reached the Final Four as a 11-seed First Four team.
- Each win in the NCAA tournament by a conference team gains a payout "unit" for the conference over six years. The Pac-12 team wins in the 2021 tournament gained a record 19 units, which will cause almost US$40 million to be paid to the conference by 2027.

== See also ==
- 2021 Pac-12 Conference women's basketball tournament
