= 2020–21 Washington State Cougars men's basketball team =

American college basketball season

2020–21 Washington State Cougars men's basketball
- Conference: Pac-12 Conference
- Record: 14–13 (7–12 Pac-12)
- Head coach: Kyle Smith (2nd season)
- Assistant coaches: Derrick Phelps; Jim Shaw; John Andrejek
- Home arena: Beasley Coliseum

2020–21 Pac-12 Conference men's basketball standings
	Conf.				Overall
Team	W		L	PCT	W		L	PCT
Oregon	14	–	4	.778	21	–	7	.750
No. 23 USC	15	–	5	.750	25	–	8	.758
No. 22 Colorado	14	–	6	.700	23	–	9	.719
UCLA	13	–	6	.684	22	–	10	.688
Arizona*	11	–	9	.550	17	–	9	.654
Oregon State †	10	–	10	.500	20	–	13	.606
Stanford	10	–	10	.500	14	–	13	.519
Utah	8	–	11	.421	12	–	13	.480
Arizona State	7	–	10	.412	11	–	14	.440
Washington State	7	–	12	.368	14	–	13	.519
Washington	4	–	16	.200	5	–	21	.192
California	3	–	17	.150	9	–	20	.310
† Conference tournament winner *Ineligible for the conference and NCAA tournaments due to self-imposed postseason ban. Rankings from AP poll

The 2020–21 Washington State Cougars men's basketball team represented Washington State University during the 2020–21 NCAA Division I men's basketball season. The team, led by second-year head coach Kyle Smith, played their home games at the Beasley Coliseum in Pullman, Washington as members in the Pac-12 Conference.

== Previous season ==
The Cougars finished the 2019–20 season 16–16, 6–12 in Pa-12 play to finish in 11th place. They defeated Colorado in the first round of the Pac-12 tournament and were set to face Arizona State in the quarterfinals, before the remainder of the Pac-12 Tournament was cancelled amid the COVID-19 pandemic. On March 12, all other conference tournaments and postseason tournaments were cancelled, making the Cougars' win over Colorado on March 11 the final game to be completed in the 2019–20 basketball season.

== Offseason ==
=== Departures ===
Name	Number	Pos.	Height	Weight	Year	Hometown	Reason for departure
Carter Sonneborn	0	G	6'3"	190	Freshman	Spokane, WA	Walk-on; transferred to Whitworth
Jervae Robinson	1	G	6'2"	185	Senior	Aurora, CO	Graduated
C. J. Elleby	2	F	6'6"	200	Sophomore	Seattle, WA	Declare for 2020 NBA draft
Daron Henson	3	F	6'7"	210	Junior	Pasadena, CA	Graduate transferred to Seattle
Marvin Cannon	5	G	6'5"	170	Junior	Richmond, VA	Transferred to Charlotte
Jeff Pollard	13	F	6'9"	240	Senior	Bountiful, UT	Graduated
Deion James	20	F	6'6"	220	GS senior	Tucson, AZ	Graduated

=== Incoming transfers ===
Name	Num	Pos.	Height	Weight	Year	Hometown	Previous school
Myles Fitzgerald-Warren	2	G	6'3"		Junior	Portland, OR	Collin College

=== 2020 recruiting class ===
College recruiting
Name	Hometown	School	Height	Weight	Commit date
TJ Bamba; G	Denver, CO	Abraham Lincoln High School	6 ft 5 in (1.96 m)	N/A	Oct 25, 2019
TJ Bamba; G	Recruit ratings: Scout: Rivals: 247Sports: ESPN:				
Andrej Jakimovski; SF	Macedonia	N/A	6 ft 7 in (2.01 m)	205 lb (93 kg)	Jun 21, 2020
Andrej Jakimovski; SF	Recruit ratings: Scout: Rivals: 247Sports: ESPN:				
Carlos Rosario; SF	Garden Grove, CA	Veritas Prep	6 ft 7 in (2.01 m)	180 lb (82 kg)	Jun 17, 2020
Carlos Rosario; SF	Recruit ratings: Scout: Rivals: 247Sports: ESPN:				
Dishon Jackson; C	Vallejo, CA	St. Patrick-St. Vincent	6 ft 10 in (2.08 m)	235 lb (107 kg)	Apr 4, 2020
Dishon Jackson; C	Recruit ratings: Scout: Rivals: 247Sports: ESPN:				
Efe Abogidi; C	Australia	NBA Global Academy	6 ft 9 in (2.06 m)	225 lb (102 kg)	Oct 22, 2019
Efe Abogidi; C	Recruit ratings: Scout: Rivals: 247Sports: ESPN:				
Jefferson Koulibaly; G	Montreal, QC	Lincoln Prep	6 ft 3 in (1.91 m)	175 lb (79 kg)	Feb 21, 2020
Jefferson Koulibaly; G	Recruit ratings: Scout: Rivals: 247Sports: ESPN:				
Overall recruit ranking:
Note: In many cases, Scout, Rivals, 247Sports, On3, and ESPN may conflict in their listings of height and weight.; In these cases, the average was taken. ESPN grades are on a 100-point scale.; Sources: "2020 Washington State Commits". Rivals.; "Men's Basketball Recruiting". Scout.; "ESPN- Washington State Cougars Men's Basketball Recruiting". ESPN.; "Scout.com Team Recruiting Rankings". Scout.; "2020 Team Ranking". Rivals.

== Roster ==
2020–21 Washington State Cougars men's basketball team
Players
Coaches

Pos.	#	Name	Height	Weight	Year	Previous school	Hometown
C	0	Efe Abogidi	6 ft 10 in (2.08 m)	225 lb (102 kg)	Fr	NBA Global Academy	Delta State, Nigeria
G	2	Myles Fitzgerald-Warren	6 ft 3 in (1.91 m)	185 lb (84 kg)	RS Jr	Collin College	Portland, OR
G	3	Jefferson Koulibaly	6 ft 3 in (1.91 m)	180 lb (82 kg)	Fr	Lincoln Prep	Montreal, QC
F	4	Aljaz Kunc	6 ft 8 in (2.03 m)	212 lb (96 kg)	Jr	Impact Academy-FLA	Ljubljana, Slovenia
F	5	TJ Bamba	6 ft 5 in (1.96 m)	208 lb (94 kg)	Fr	Abraham Lincoln HS	Bronx, NY
G	10	Isaac Bonton	6 ft 3 in (1.91 m)	190 lb (86 kg)	Sr	Casper College	Portland, OR
F	11	DJ Rodman	6 ft 6 in (1.98 m)	215 lb (98 kg)	So	JSerra Catholic HS	Newport Beach, CA
F	13	Carlos Rosario	6 ft 7 in (2.01 m)	180 lb (82 kg)	Fr	Veritas Prep	Santo Domingo, DR
C	15	Volodymyr Markovetskyy	7 ft 1 in (2.16 m)	270 lb (122 kg)	So	Kaunas A. Puškinas	Truskavets, Ukraine
C	21	Dishon Jackson	6 ft 10 in (2.08 m)	235 lb (107 kg)	Fr	St. Patrick-St. Vincent HS	Vallejo, CA
G	22	Ryan Rapp	6 ft 5 in (1.96 m)	189 lb (86 kg)	So	Mazenod College	Melbourne, Australia
F	23	Andrej Jakimovski	6 ft 8 in (2.03 m)	215 lb (98 kg)	Fr	Reale Mutua Torino	Skopje, Macedonia
G	24	Noah Williams	6 ft 5 in (1.96 m)	187 lb (85 kg)	So	O'Dea HS	Seattle, WA
F	32	Tony Miller (W)	6 ft 6 in (1.98 m)	210 lb (95 kg)	RS Sr	Montana	Woodinville, WA
F	33	Brandon Chatfield (W)	6 ft 10 in (2.08 m)	210 lb (95 kg)	RS Fr	Clarkston HS	Clarkston, WA

Head coach

- Kyle Smith (Hamilton)

Assistant coach(es)

- Derrick Phelps (North Carolina)
- Jim Shaw (Western Oregon)
- John Andrejek (Columbia)

Legend

- (C) Team captain
- (S) Suspended
- (I) Ineligible
- (W) Walk-on
- Injured
- Current redshirt

Roster

== Schedule and results ==
Date time, TV	Rank^{#}	Opponent^{#}	Result	Record	High points	High rebounds	High assists	Site (attendance) city, state
Regular season
November 25, 2020*; 8:00 pm, P12N		Texas Southern	W 56–52	1–0	28 – Bonton	8 – Abogidi	3 – Bonton	Beasley Coliseum (0); Pullman, WA
November 28, 2020*; 8:00 pm, P12N		Eastern Washington	W 71–68	2–0	19 – Williams	8 – Williams	3 – Williams	Beasley Coliseum (0); Pullman, WA
December 3, 2020; 7:00 pm, P12N		Oregon State	W 59–55	3–0 (1–0)	15 – Bonton	7 – Abogidi	7 – Bonton	Beasley Coliseum (0); Pullman, WA
December 9, 2020*; 6:00 pm, P12N		Idaho; Battle of the Palouse	W 61–58	4–0	19 – Williams	8 – Bonton	4 – Williams	Beasley Coliseum (0); Pullman, WA
December 13, 2020*; 2:00 pm, P12N		Portland State	W 69–60	5–0	18 – Williams	6 – Jakimovski	5 – Rapp	Beasley Coliseum (0); Pullman, WA
December 18, 2020*; 6:00 pm, P12N		Montana State	W 82–54	6–0	21 – Williams	14 – Abogidi	3 – Williams	Beasley Coliseum (0); Pullman, WA
December 21, 2020*; 4:00 pm, P12N		Prairie View A&M	W 90–62	7–0	16 – Abogidi	14 – Abogidi	7 – Bonton	Beasley Coliseum (0); Pullman, WA
December 23, 2020*; 4:00 pm, P12N		Northwestern State	W 62–52	8–0	15 – Abogidi	12 – Abogidi	2 – Bonton	Beasley Coliseum (0); Pullman, WA
January 2, 2021; 7:30 pm, P12N		Arizona	L 82–86 ^{2OT}	8–1 (1–1)	25 – Bonton	8 – Jakimovski	3 – Bonton	Beasley Coliseum (0); Pullman, WA
January 7, 2021; 7:00 pm, P12N		at California	W 71–60	9–1 (2–1)	21 – Bonton	9 – Abogidi	6 – Bonton	Haas Pavilion (0); Berkeley, CA
January 9, 2021; 6:30 pm, P12N		at Stanford	L 60–75	9–2 (2–2)	19 – Jakimovski	8 – Miller	7 – Bonton	Kaiser Permanente Arena (1); Santa Cruz, CA
January 14, 2021; 2:00 pm, FS1		at UCLA	L 61–91	9–3 (2–3)	23 – Bonton	5 – Bamba	4 – Miller	Pauley Pavilion (0); Los Angeles, CA
January 16, 2021; 6:30 pm, P12N		at USC	L 77–85	9–4 (2–4)	27 – Bonton	12 – Abogidi	4 – Bonton	Galen Center (0); Los Angeles, CA
January 21, 2021; 7:00 pm, P12N		Utah	L 56–71	9–5 (2–5)	17 – Williams	6 – Jakimovski	5 – Williams	Beasley Coliseum (0); Pullman, WA
January 23, 2021; 5:00 pm, ESPN2		Colorado	L 59–70	9–6 (2–6)	21 – Bonton	7 – Jakimovski	3 – Bonton	Beasley Coliseum (0); Pullman, WA
January 27, 2020; 6:00 pm, ESPNU		at Colorado	L 58–70	9–7 (2–7)	15 – Williams	8 – Jackson	2 – Tied	CU Events Center (0); Boulder, CO
January 31, 2021; 5:00 pm, P12N		at Washington; Rivalry	W 77–62	10–7 (3–7)	25 – Bonton	13 – Abogidi	4 – Bonton	Alaska Airlines Arena (0); Seattle, WA
February 4, 2021; 8:00 pm, FS1		at Oregon	W 74–71	11–7 (4–7)	23 – Bonton	5 – Tied	4 – Bonton	Matthew Knight Arena (0); Eugene, OR
February 6, 2021; 3:00 pm, P12N		at Oregon State	L 66–68	11–8 (4–8)	14 – Rodman	7 – Tied	8 – Bonton	Gill Coliseum (0); Corvallis, OR
February 11, 2021; 8:00 pm, FS1		UCLA	W 81–73	12–8 (5–8)	26 – Bonton	8 – Tied	8 – Rapp	Beasley Coliseum (0); Pullman, WA
February 13, 2021; 5:00 pm, ESPNU		No. 20 USC	L 65–76	12–9 (5–9)	18 – Jackson	7 – Abogidi	5 – Bonton	Beasley Coliseum (0); Pullman, WA
February 15, 2021; 5:00 pm, P12N		Washington; Rivalry	L 63–65	12–10 (4–10)	14 – Kunc	8 – Abogidi	7 – Williams	Beasley Coliseum (0); Pullman, WA
February 18, 2021; 7:30 pm, P12N		California	W 81–52	13–10 (6–10)	32 – Williams	9 – Williams	9 – Jakimovski	Beasley Coliseum (200); Pullman, WA
February 20, 2021; 1:00 pm, ESPN2		Stanford	W 85–76 ^{3OT}	14–10 (7–10)	40 – Williams	10 – Jackson	9 – Jakimovski	Beasley Coliseum (200); Pullman, WA
February 25, 2021; 8:00 pm, FS1		at Arizona	L 53–69	14–11 (7–11)	12 – Bamba	13 – Kunc	2 – Tied	McKale Center (0); Tucson, AZ
February 27, 2021; 6:00 pm, P12N		at Arizona State	L 74–77 ^{OT}	14–12 (7–12)	15 – Tied	9 – Jackson	6 – Williams	Desert Financial Arena (0); Tempe, AZ
March 1, 2021; 12:00 pm, P12N		at Arizona State	Cancelled due to COVID-19 issues					Desert Financial Arena; Tempe, AZ
Pac-12 Tournament
March 10, 2021; 1:00 pm, P12N	(9)	vs. (8) Arizona State; First round	L 59–64	14–13	19 – Bonton	9 – Kunc	4 – Tied	T-Mobile Arena (0); Paradise, NV
*Non-conference game. ^{#}Rankings from AP Poll. (#) Tournament seedings in parentheses. All times are in Pacific Time.
