= 2020–21 Washington Huskies men's basketball team =

American college basketball season

2020–21 Washington Huskies men's basketball
- Conference: Pac-12 Conference
- Record: 5–21 (4–16 Pac-12)
- Head coach: Mike Hopkins (4th season)
- Assistant coaches: Will Conroy (6th season); Cameron Dollar (4th season); Dave Rice (4th season)
- Home arena: Alaska Airlines Arena

2020–21 Pac-12 Conference men's basketball standings
| | Conf. | | | | Overall |
| Team | W | | L | PCT | W | | L | PCT |
|---|---|---|---|---|---|---|---|---|
| Oregon | 14 | – | 4 | .778 | 21 | – | 7 | .750 |
| No. 23 USC | 15 | – | 5 | .750 | 25 | – | 8 | .758 |
| No. 22 Colorado | 14 | – | 6 | .700 | 23 | – | 9 | .719 |
| UCLA | 13 | – | 6 | .684 | 22 | – | 10 | .688 |
| Arizona* | 11 | – | 9 | .550 | 17 | – | 9 | .654 |
| Oregon State † | 10 | – | 10 | .500 | 20 | – | 13 | .606 |
| Stanford | 10 | – | 10 | .500 | 14 | – | 13 | .519 |
| Utah | 8 | – | 11 | .421 | 12 | – | 13 | .480 |
| Arizona State | 7 | – | 10 | .412 | 11 | – | 14 | .440 |
| Washington State | 7 | – | 12 | .368 | 14 | – | 13 | .519 |
| Washington | 4 | – | 16 | .200 | 5 | – | 21 | .192 |
| California | 3 | – | 17 | .150 | 9 | – | 20 | .310 |
† Conference tournament winner *Ineligible for the conference and NCAA tournaments due to self-imposed postseason ban. Rankings from AP poll

The 2020–21 Washington Huskies men's basketball team represented the University of Washington in the 2020–21 NCAA Division I men's basketball season. The Huskies, led by fourth-year head coach Mike Hopkins, played their home games at Alaska Airlines Arena at Hec Edmundson Pavilion in Seattle, Washington as members of the Pac-12 Conference.

== Previous season ==
The Huskies finished the 2019–20 season 15–17, 5–13 in Pac-12 play to finish in twelfth place. Isaiah Stewart was named to the All Pac-12 first team and All-Freshman team. The Huskies as the 12th seed lost to Arizona in a first-round game of the Pac-12 tournament. The rest of the Pac-12 tournament and all post-season tournaments were canceled due to the COVID-19 pandemic.

== Off-season ==
=== Departures ===
| Name | Number | Pos. | Height | Weight | Year | Hometown | Reason for departure |
|---|---|---|---|---|---|---|---|
| Elijah Hardy | 10 | G | 6'6" | 170 | Junior | Oakland, CA | Transferred to Portland State |
| Jason Crandall | 12 | G | 6'0" | 155 | Senior | Issaquah, Washington | Graduated |
| Sam Timmins | 14 | F | 6'11" | 265 | Senior | Dunedin, New Zealand | Graduated and signed with Franklin Bulls |
| Quin Barnard | 20 | G | 6'0" | 175 | RS junior | Bellevue, Washington | Graduated |
| Isaiah Stewart | 33 | C | 6'9" | 250 | Freshman | Rochester, NY | 2020 NBA draft |
| Jaden McDaniels | 0 | F | 6'9" | 200 | Freshman | Federal Way, WA | 2020 NBA draft |
| Bryan Penn-Johnson | 23 | C | 7'0" | 245 | RS sophomore | Long Beach, California | Transferred to LSU |
| Nahziah Carter | 11 | G | 6'6" | 205 | Senior | Rochester, NY | Suspended before senior season and announced that would turn pro |

=== Incoming transfers ===
| Name | Number | Pos. | Height | Weight | Year | Hometown | Previous school |
|---|---|---|---|---|---|---|---|
| Nate Pryor | 4 | G | 6'4" | 165 | Junior | Seattle, Washington | North Idaho College |
| Cole Bajema | 22 | G | 6'7" | 175 | Sophomore | Lynden, Washington | Michigan |
| Erik Stevenson | 10 | G | 6'3" | 198 | Junior | Lacey, Washington | Wichita State |

=== 2021 recruiting class ===
College recruiting (2021)
| Name | Hometown | School | Height | Weight | Commit date |
|---|---|---|---|---|---|
| Jackson Grant; C | Olympia, WA | Olympia High School | 6 ft 10 in (2.08 m) | 205 lb (93 kg) | Nov 9, 2019 |
| Jackson Grant; C | Recruit ratings: Rivals: 247Sports: ESPN: (86) | | | | |
| Dominiq Penn; G | Dublin, OH | Sunrise Christian Academy (KS) | 6 ft 0 in (1.83 m) | 175 lb (79 kg) | Jan 5, 2021 |
| Dominiq Penn; G | Recruit ratings: Rivals: 247Sports: ESPN: (79) | | | | |
| Samuel Ariyibi; F | Nigeria | NBA Africa Academy | 6 ft 8 in (2.03 m) | 190 lb (86 kg) | Mar 25, 2021 |
| Samuel Ariyibi; F | Recruit ratings: No ratings found | | | | |
Overall recruit ranking:
Note: In many cases, Scout, Rivals, 247Sports, On3, and ESPN may conflict in their listings of height and weight.; In these cases, the average was taken. ESPN grades are on a 100-point scale.; Sources: "2021 Washington Commits". Rivals.; "ESPN- Washington Huskies Men's Basketball Recruiting". ESPN.; "2021 Team Ranking". Rivals.

== Roster ==
2020–21 Washington Huskies men's basketball team
Players
Coaches

| Pos. | # | Name | Height | Weight | Year | Previous school | Hometown |
|---|---|---|---|---|---|---|---|
| G | 0 | Marcus Tsohonis | 6 ft 3 in (1.91 m) | 190 lb (86 kg) | So | Jefferson | Portland, OR |
| F | 1 | Nate Roberts | 6 ft 11 in (2.11 m) | 265 lb (120 kg) | RS So | Brewster Academy | Washington, D.C. |
| G | 4 | Nate Pryor | 6 ft 4 in (1.93 m) | 175 lb (79 kg) | Jr | North Idaho College | Seattle, WA |
| G | 5 | Jamal Bey | 6 ft 6 in (1.98 m) | 210 lb (95 kg) | Jr | Bishop Gorman | Las Vegas, NV |
| G | 10 | Erik Stevenson | 6 ft 3 in (1.91 m) | 200 lb (91 kg) | Jr | Wichita State | Lacey, WA |
| F | 13 | Hameir Wright | 6 ft 9 in (2.06 m) | 220 lb (100 kg) | Sr | Albany Academy | Albany, NY |
| G | 14 | Kyle Luttinen (W) | 6 ft 7 in (2.01 m) | 185 lb (84 kg) | Fr | Roosevelt | Seattle, WA |
| G | 15 | Griff Hopkins (W) | 6 ft 4 in (1.93 m) | 185 lb (84 kg) | Fr | Bellevue | Syracuse, NY |
| G | 21 | RaeQuan Battle | 6 ft 5 in (1.96 m) | 175 lb (79 kg) | So | Marysville Pilchuck | Tulalip, WA |
| G | 22 | Cole Bajema | 6 ft 7 in (2.01 m) | 190 lb (86 kg) | So | Michigan | Lynden, WA |
| G | 24 | Jonah Geron (W) | 6 ft 6 in (1.98 m) | 195 lb (88 kg) | RS So | San Joaquin Memorial | Fresno, CA |
| G | 30 | Travis Rice (W) | 6 ft 2 in (1.88 m) | 185 lb (84 kg) | RS Sr | Northern Arizona | Las Vegas, NV |
| G | 32 | Noah Neubauer (W) | 6 ft 3 in (1.91 m) | 190 lb (86 kg) | RS So | Garfield | Seattle, WA |
| F | 33 | J'Raan Brooks | 6 ft 9 in (2.06 m) | 220 lb (100 kg) | Jr | USC | Seattle, WA |
| F | 34 | Regan Lundeen (W) | 6 ft 6 in (1.98 m) | 230 lb (104 kg) | Jr | Mater Dei | Santa Ana, CA |
| C | 52 | Riley Sorn (W) | 7 ft 4 in (2.24 m) | 255 lb (116 kg) | RS So | Richland | Richland, WA |
| G | 55 | Quade Green | 6 ft 0 in (1.83 m) | 170 lb (77 kg) | Sr | Kentucky | Philadelphia, PA |

Head coach

- Mike Hopkins (Syracuse)

Assistant coach(es)

- Will Conroy (Washington)
- Cameron Dollar (UCLA)
- Dave Rice (UNLV)

Legend

- (C) Team captain
- (S) Suspended
- (I) Ineligible
- (W) Walk-on
- Injured
- Current redshirt

Roster
Last update: February 15, 2021

=== Depth chart ===
| Pos. | Starting 5 | Bench 1 | Bench 2 |
|---|---|---|---|
| C | Nate Roberts | Riley Sorn |
| PF | Hameir Wright | J'raan Brooks |
| SF | Jamal Bey | RaeQuan Battle |
| SG | Erik Stevenson |
| PG | Quade Green | Marcus Tsohonis | Nate Pryor |

== Schedule and results ==
| Date time, TV | Rank^{#} | Opponent^{#} | Result | Record | High points | High rebounds | High assists | Site (attendance) city, state |
Regular season
| November 25, 2020*; 8:00 pm, P12N | | Portland State; Husky Classic | Canceled due to COVID-19 issues | | | | | Alaska Airlines Arena; Seattle, WA |
| November 27, 2020*; 4:00 pm, P12N | | San Diego; Husky Classic | Canceled due to COVID-19 issues | | | | | Alaska Airlines Arena; Seattle, WA |
| November 28, 2020*; 6:00 pm, P12N | | Cal State Fullerton; Husky Classic | Canceled due to COVID-19 issues | | | | | Alaska Airlines Arena; Seattle, WA |
| November 29, 2020*; 3:00 pm, FloHoops | | vs. No. 2 Baylor; Men's Vegas Bubble | L 52–86 | 0–1 | 10 – Battle | 5 – Roberts | 4 – Tsohonis | T-Mobile Arena (0); Paradise, NV |
| December 1, 2020*; 1:00 pm, FloHoops | | vs. UC Riverside; Men's Vegas Bubble | L 42–57 | 0–2 | 18 – Green | 8 – Green | 4 – Green | T-Mobile Arena (0); Paradise, NV |
| December 3, 2020; 3:00 pm, P12N | | at Utah | L 62–76 | 0–3 (0–1) | 21 – Green | 13 – Roberts | 4 – Green | Jon M. Huntsman Center (0); Salt Lake City, UT |
| December 9, 2020*; 8:00 pm, P12N | | Seattle | W 73–41 | 1–3 | 18 – Green | 8 – Roberts | 4 – Pryor | Alaska Airlines Arena (0); Seattle, WA |
| December 12, 2020; 5:00 pm, P12N | | Oregon | L 71–74 | 1–4 (0–2) | 26 – Green | 8 – Roberts | 5 – Green | Alaska Airlines Arena (0); Seattle, WA |
| December 16, 2020*; 8:00 pm, P12N | | Montana | L 58–66 | 1–5 | 13 – Tied | 10 – Roberts | 4 – Green | Alaska Airlines Arena (0); Seattle, WA |
| December 20, 2020*; 7:00 pm, P12N | | vs. Colorado; Far West Classic | L 69–92 | 1–6 | 16 – Sorn | 8 – Sorn | 5 – Pryor | T-Mobile Arena (0); Paradise, NV |
| December 31, 2020; 5:00 pm, P12N | | Arizona | L 53–80 | 1–7 (0–3) | 23 – Green | 8 – Roberts | 2 – Tied | Alaska Airlines Arena (0); Seattle, WA |
| January 7, 2021; 6:00 pm, FS1 | | at Stanford | L 75–91 | 1–8 (0–4) | 24 – Tsohonis | 7 – Roberts | 5 – Green | Kaiser Permanente Arena (1); Santa Cruz, CA |
| January 9, 2021; 12:00 pm, P12N | | at California | L 78–84 | 1–9 (0–5) | 27 – Stevenson | 6 – Roberts | 4 – Green | Haas Pavilion (0); Berkeley, CA |
| January 14, 2021; 6:30 pm, P12N | | at USC | L 68–95 | 1–10 (0–6) | 16 – Stevenson | 8 – Roberts | 3 – Tied | Galen Center (0); Los Angeles, CA |
| January 16, 2021; 2:00 pm, P12N | | at UCLA | L 76–81 | 1–11 (0–7) | 25 – Green | 7 – Wright | 5 – Green | Pauley Pavilion (0); Los Angeles, CA |
| January 20, 2021; 6:00 pm, ESPN2 | | Colorado | W 84–80 | 2–11 (1–7) | 27 – Tsohonis | 7 – Stevenson | 5 – Green | Alaska Airlines Arena (0); Seattle, WA |
| January 24, 2021; 1:00 pm, ESPNU | | Utah | W 83–79 | 3–11 (2–7) | 28 – Bey | 7 – Roberts | 4 – Green | Alaska Airlines Arena (0); Seattle, WA |
| January 31, 2021; 5:00 pm, P12N | | Washington State; Rivalry | L 62–77 | 3–12 (2–8) | 20 – Green | 7 – Bey | 4 – Bey | Alaska Airlines Arena (0); Seattle, WA |
| February 4, 2021; 6:00 pm, P12N | | at Oregon State | L 71–91 | 3–13 (2–9) | 22 – Tsohonis | 6 – Sorn | 2 – Tied | Gill Coliseum (0); Corvallis, OR |
| February 6, 2021; 1:00 pm, CBS | | at Oregon | L 74–86 | 3–14 (2–10) | 23 – Green | 4 – Green | 4 – Green | Matthew Knight Arena (0); Eugene, OR |
| February 11, 2021; 7:00 pm, P12N | | No. 20 USC | L 54–69 | 3–15 (2–11) | 16 – Green | 4 – Tied | 4 – Green | Alaska Airlines Arena (0); Seattle, WA |
| February 13, 2021; 4:30 pm, P12N | | UCLA | L 61–64 | 3–16 (2–12) | 25 – Green | 11 – Wright | 5 – Green | Alaska Airlines Arena (0); Seattle, WA |
| February 15, 2021; 5:00 pm, P12N | | at Washington State; Rivalry | W 65–63 | 4–16 (3–12) | 29 – Tsohonis | 7 – Stevenson | 7 – Stevenson | Beasley Coliseum (0); Pullman, WA |
| February 18, 2021; 8:00 pm, FS1 | | Stanford | L 61–79 | 4–17 (3–13) | 13 – Bajema | 5 – Tsohonis | 3 – Green | Alaska Airlines Arena (0); Seattle, WA |
| February 20, 2021; 7:00 pm, ESPNU | | California | W 62–51 | 5–17 (4–13) | 17 – Green | 9 – Bey | 4 – Tsohonis | Alaska Airlines Arena (0); Seattle, WA |
| February 23, 2021; 6:00 pm, P12N | | at Arizona State | L 64–97 | 5–18 (4–14) | 16 – Tsohonis | 6 – Tsohonis | 3 – Stevenson | Desert Financial Arena (0); Tempe, AZ |
| February 25, 2021; 4:00 pm, FS1 | | at Arizona State | L 72–80 | 5–19 (4–15) | 16 – Green | 11 – Roberts | 7 – Green | Desert Financial Arena (0); Tempe, AZ |
| February 27, 2021; 11:00 am, CBS | | at Arizona | L 74–75 | 5–20 (4–16) | 18 – Wright | 8 – Stevenson | 4 – Stevenson | McKale Center (0); Tucson, AZ |
Pac-12 Tournament
| March 10, 2021; 4:00 pm, P12N | (10) | vs. (7) Utah; First round | L 95–98 | 5–21 | 31 – Green | 6 – Tied | 7 – Green | T-Mobile Arena (0); Paradise, NV |
*Non-conference game. ^{#}Rankings from AP Poll. (#) Tournament seedings in parentheses. All times are in Pacific Time.

Washington was scheduled to play Tulane in the Pac-12 2020 China game on November 14. However, the game was canceled due to the COVID-19 pandemic. A game against Oklahoma in the Pac-12 Coast-to-Coast Challenge and a game against Auburn were also canceled.

== Rankings ==
Ranking movements Legend: — = Not ranked
| | Week | | | | | | | | | | | | | | | | | |
| Poll | Pre | 1 | 2 | 3 | 4 | 5 | 6 | 7 | 8 | 9 | 10 | 11 | 12 | 13 | 14 | 15 | 16 | Final |
|---|---|---|---|---|---|---|---|---|---|---|---|---|---|---|---|---|---|---|
| AP | — | — | — | — | — | — | — | — | — | — | — | — | — | — | — | — | — | Not released |
| Coaches | — | — | — | — | — | — | — | — | — | — | — | — | — | — | — | — | — | — |

*AP does not release post-NCAA Tournament rankings.
^Coaches did not release a Week 2 poll.

== Awards and honors ==
=== All Pac-12 Team ===
- Quade Green: honorable mention

=== Pac-12 Player of the Week ===
- Jamal Bey: week 8 Colorado, Utah
