= 2020–21 Utah Utes men's basketball team =

American college basketball season

2020–21 Utah Utes men's basketball
- Conference: Pac-12 Conference
- Record: 12–13 (8–11 Pac–12)
- Head coach: Larry Krystkowiak (10th season)
- Assistant coaches: Tommy Connor; Andy Hill; Henry Martinez
- Home arena: Jon M. Huntsman Center

2020–21 Pac-12 Conference men's basketball standings
| | Conf. | | | | Overall |
| Team | W | | L | PCT | W | | L | PCT |
|---|---|---|---|---|---|---|---|---|
| Oregon | 14 | – | 4 | .778 | 21 | – | 7 | .750 |
| No. 23 USC | 15 | – | 5 | .750 | 25 | – | 8 | .758 |
| No. 22 Colorado | 14 | – | 6 | .700 | 23 | – | 9 | .719 |
| UCLA | 13 | – | 6 | .684 | 22 | – | 10 | .688 |
| Arizona* | 11 | – | 9 | .550 | 17 | – | 9 | .654 |
| Oregon State † | 10 | – | 10 | .500 | 20 | – | 13 | .606 |
| Stanford | 10 | – | 10 | .500 | 14 | – | 13 | .519 |
| Utah | 8 | – | 11 | .421 | 12 | – | 13 | .480 |
| Arizona State | 7 | – | 10 | .412 | 11 | – | 14 | .440 |
| Washington State | 7 | – | 12 | .368 | 14 | – | 13 | .519 |
| Washington | 4 | – | 16 | .200 | 5 | – | 21 | .192 |
| California | 3 | – | 17 | .150 | 9 | – | 20 | .310 |
† Conference tournament winner *Ineligible for the conference and NCAA tournaments due to self-imposed postseason ban. Rankings from AP poll

The 2020–21 Utah Runnin' Utes men's basketball team represented the University of Utah during the 2020–21 NCAA Division I men's basketball season. The team is led by tenth-year head coach Larry Krystkowiak. They played their home games at the Jon M. Huntsman Center in Salt Lake City, Utah as members of the Pac-12 Conference.

== Previous season ==
The Utes finished the 2019–20 season 16–15, 7–11 in Pac-12 play to finish in a three-way tie for eighth place. They lost in the first round of the Pac-12 tournament to Oregon State.

== Off-season ==
=== Departures ===
| Name | Num | Pos. | Height | Weight | Year | Hometown | Reason for departure |
|---|---|---|---|---|---|---|---|
| Matt Van Komen | 2 | C | 7'4" | 220 | Freshman | Pleasant Grove, UT | Transferred to Saint Mary's |
| Brandon Haddock | 10 | G | 6'2" | 165 | Freshman | Southlake, TX | Walk-on; left the team for personal reasons |
| Both Gach | 11 | G | 6'7" | 195 | Sophomore | Austin, MN | Transferred to Minnesota |
| Marc Reininger | 40 | F | 6'9" | 220 | Senior | Monument, CO | Walk-on; graduated |
| Ben Bittner | 45 | G | 6'6" | 190 | Sophomore | West Jordan, UT | Walk-on; left the team for personal reasons |

=== Incoming transfers ===
| Name | Num | Pos. | Height | Weight | Year | Hometown | Previous school |
|---|---|---|---|---|---|---|---|
| Jordan Kellier | 10 | G | 6'6' | | Sophomore | Kingston, Jamaica | Junior college transferred from Williston State College |

=== 2020 recruiting class ===
College recruiting information
| Name | Hometown | School | Height | Weight | Commit date |
|---|---|---|---|---|---|
| Ian Martinez #28 SG | San Juan Capistrano, CA | J. Serra Catholic High School | 6 ft 3 in (1.91 m) | 165 lb (75 kg) | May 29, 2019 |
| Ian Martinez #28 SG | Recruit ratings: Scout: Rivals: 247Sports: ESPN: (80) | | | | |
| Pelle Larsson #41 SG | Sweden, EUR | N/A | 6 ft 5 in (1.96 m) | 200 lb (91 kg) | Nov 8, 2019 |
| Pelle Larsson #41 SG | Recruit ratings: Scout: Rivals: 247Sports: ESPN: (79) | | | | |
Overall recruit ranking:
Note: In many cases, Scout, Rivals, 247Sports, On3, and ESPN may conflict in their listings of height and weight.; In these cases, the average was taken. ESPN grades are on a 100-point scale.; Sources: "2020 Utah Basketball Commitment List". Rivals.; "Utah Utes 2020 Player Commits". ESPN.; "2020 Team Ranking". Rivals.

=== 2021 recruiting class ===
College recruiting information (2021)
| Name | Hometown | School | Height | Weight | Commit date |
|---|---|---|---|---|---|
| Lazar Stefanovic; SF | Belgrade, Serbia | N/A | 6 ft 6 in (1.98 m) | 180 lb (82 kg) | Oct 28, 2020 |
| Lazar Stefanovic; SF | Recruit ratings: Scout: Rivals: 247Sports: ESPN: (0) | | | | |
| Norbert Thelissen; SF | Norway | Heroes Den Bosch | 6 ft 6 in (1.98 m) | 180 lb (82 kg) | Jul 29, 2020 |
| Norbert Thelissen; SF | Recruit ratings: Scout: Rivals: 247Sports: ESPN: (0) | | | | |
Overall recruit ranking:
Note: In many cases, Scout, Rivals, 247Sports, On3, and ESPN may conflict in their listings of height and weight.; In these cases, the average was taken. ESPN grades are on a 100-point scale.; Sources: "2021 Utah Basketball Commitment List". Rivals.; "Utah Utes 2021 Player Commits". ESPN.; "2021 Team Ranking". Rivals.

=== 2022 recruiting class ===
College recruiting information (2022)
| Name | Hometown | School | Height | Weight | Commit date |
|---|---|---|---|---|---|
| Mason Falslev #62 SG | Smithfield, UT | Sky View High School | 6 ft 3 in (1.91 m) | 180 lb (82 kg) | Jul 28, 2018 |
| Mason Falslev #62 SG | Recruit ratings: Scout: Rivals: 247Sports: ESPN: (75) | | | | |
Overall recruit ranking:
Note: In many cases, Scout, Rivals, 247Sports, On3, and ESPN may conflict in their listings of height and weight.; In these cases, the average was taken. ESPN grades are on a 100-point scale.; Sources: "2022 Utah Basketball Commitment List". Rivals.; "Utah Utes 2022 Player Commits". ESPN.; "2022 Team Ranking". Rivals.

== Roster ==
2020–21 Utah Utes men's basketball team
Players
Coaches

| Pos. | # | Name | Height | Weight | Year | Previous school | Hometown |
|---|---|---|---|---|---|---|---|
| F | 0 | Luc Krystkowiak (W) | 6 ft 4 in (1.93 m) | 195 lb (88 kg) | RS Fr | Bingham HS | Salt Lake City, Utah |
| F | 1 | Timmy Allen | 6 ft 6 in (1.98 m) | 205 lb (93 kg) | Jr | Red Mountain HS | Mesa, Arizona |
| G | 2 | Ian Martinez | 6 ft 3 in (1.91 m) | 183 lb (83 kg) | Fr | JSerra Catholic HS | Heredia, Costa Rica |
| G | 3 | Pelle Larsson | 6 ft 5 in (1.96 m) | 215 lb (98 kg) | Fr | Riksbasketgymnasiet Luleå | Nacka, Sweden |
| G | 5 | Jaxon Brenchley | 6 ft 5 in (1.96 m) | 194 lb (88 kg) | So | Ridgeline HS | Providence, Utah |
| G | 10 | Jordan Kellier | 6 ft 6 in (1.98 m) | 215 lb (98 kg) | So | Williston State | Portmore, Jamaica |
| G | 13 | Elias Ballstaedt (W) | 6 ft 5 in (1.96 m) | 200 lb (91 kg) | So | Wasatch HS | Heber City, Utah |
| G | 14 | Brooks King (W) | 6 ft 3 in (1.91 m) | 167 lb (76 kg) | RS Jr | Centennial HS | Boise, Idaho |
| G | 15 | Rylan Jones | 6 ft 0 in (1.83 m) | 178 lb (81 kg) | So | Olympus HS | Salt Lake City, Utah |
| F | 20 | Mikael Jantunen | 6 ft 8 in (2.03 m) | 220 lb (100 kg) | So | Helsinki Basketball Academy | Helsinki, Finland |
| F | 21 | Riley Battin | 6 ft 9 in (2.06 m) | 230 lb (104 kg) | Jr | Oak Park HS | Oak Park, California |
| G | 25 | Alfonso Plummer | 6 ft 1 in (1.85 m) | 182 lb (83 kg) | Sr | Arizona Western College | Fajardo, Puerto Rico |
| G | 30 | Brendan Wenzel | 6 ft 7 in (2.01 m) | 215 lb (98 kg) | RS Fr | O'Connor HS | San Antonio, Texas |
| G | 31 | Jack Jamele (W) | 6 ft 5 in (1.96 m) | 185 lb (84 kg) | Fr | Middlebrooks Academy | Palos Verdes, California |
| C | 32 | Lahat Thioune | 6 ft 10 in (2.08 m) | 243 lb (110 kg) | RS So | Florida Prep | Dakar, Senegal |
| G | 34 | Harrison Creer (W) | 6 ft 4 in (1.93 m) | 234 lb (106 kg) | Fr | Olympus HS | Holladay, Utah |
| C | 35 | Branden Carlson | 7 ft 0 in (2.13 m) | 219 lb (99 kg) | So | Bingham HS | South Jordan, Utah |

Head coach

- Larry Krystkowiak (Montana)

Assistant coach(es)

- Andy Hill (Eastern Washington)
- Tommy Connor (Utah)
- Henry Martinez

Legend

- (C) Team captain
- (S) Suspended
- (I) Ineligible
- (W) Walk-on
- Injured
- Current redshirt

Roster

== Schedule and results ==
| Date time, TV | Rank^{#} | Opponent^{#} | Result | Record | High points | High rebounds | High assists | Site (attendance) city, state |
Regular season
| December 3, 2020; 4:00 pm, P12N | | Washington | W 76–62 | 1–0 (1–0) | 21 – Plummer | 8 – Tied | 7 – Larsson | Jon M. Huntsman Center (0); Salt Lake City, UT |
| December 8, 2020*; 4:00 pm, P12N | | Idaho State | W 75–59 | 2–0 | 14 – Larsson | 5 – Tied | 5 – Jones | Jon M. Huntsman Center (0); Salt Lake City, UT |
| December 12, 2020*; 4:00 pm, BYUtv | | at BYU; Holy War | L 64–82 | 2–1 | 19 – Plummer | 8 – Carlson | 5 – Allen | Marriott Center (0); Provo, UT |
| December 15, 2020*; 5:00 pm, P12N | | Utah Valley; Old Oquirrh Bucket | W 75–67 | 3–1 | 19 – Allen | 6 – Allen | 4 – Tied | Jon M. Huntsman Center (0); Salt Lake City, UT |
| December 18, 2020*; 7:00 pm, P12N | | Idaho | W 79–41 | 4–1 | 22 – Allen | 9 – Thioune | 7 – Jones | Jon M. Huntsman Center (0); Salt Lake City, UT |
| December 31, 2020; 5:00 pm, FS1 | | at UCLA | L 70–72 | 4–2 (1–1) | 22 – Plummer | 6 – Tied | 4 – Jones | Pauley Pavilion; Los Angeles, CA |
| January 2, 2021; 2:00 pm, P12N | | at USC | L 46–64 | 4–3 (1–2) | 10 – Martinez | 8 – Allen | 3 – Tied | Galen Center; Los Angeles, CA |
| January 9, 2021; 7:30 pm, P12N | | No. 17 Oregon | L 73–79 | 4–4 (1–3) | 23 – Allen | 7 – Jantunen | 8 – Jones | Jon M. Huntsman Center; Salt Lake City, UT |
| January 11, 2021; 4:00 pm, P12N | | Colorado | L 58–65 | 4–5 (1–4) | 19 – Allen | 9 – Tied | 4 – Tied | Jon M. Huntsman Center; Salt Lake City, UT |
| January 13, 2021; 9:00 pm, ESPN2 | | Stanford | W 79–65 | 5–5 (2–4) | 22 – Allen | 8 – Allen | 5 – Allen | Jon M. Huntsman Center; Salt Lake City, UT |
| January 16, 2021; 7:00 pm, ESPNU | | California | L 63–72 | 5–6 (2–5) | 26 – Allen | 6 – Tied | 5 – Allen | Jon M. Huntsman Center; Salt Lake City, UT |
| January 21, 2021; 8:00 pm, P12N | | at Washington State | W 71-56 | 6-6 (3-5) | 14 – Carlson | 10 – Carlson | 10 – Jones | Beasley Coliseum; Pullman, WA |
| January 24, 2021; 3:00 pm, ESPNU | | at Washington | L 79-83 | 6-7 (3-6) | 18 – Carlson | 7 – Allen | 10 – Allen | Alaska Airlines Arena (0); Seattle, WA |
| January 30, 2021; 12:30 pm, P12N | | at Colorado | W 77-74 | 7-7 (4-6) | 23 – Plummer | 10 – Allen | 4 – Allen | CU Events Center (0); Boulder, CO |
| February 2, 2021; 2:00 pm, P12N | | at Arizona State | Postponed due to COVID-19 issues | | | | | Desert Financial Arena; Tempe, AZ |
| February 4, 2021; 5:00 pm, FS1 | | Arizona | W 73–58 | 8-7 (5-6) | 18 – Allen | 9 – Allen | 4 – Larsson | Jon M. Huntsman Center (0); Salt Lake City, UT |
| February 11, 2021; 4:00 pm, P12N | | at California | W 76-75 | 9-7 (6-6) | 18 – Allen | 5 – Martinez | 3 – Tied | Haas Pavilion (0); Berkeley, CA |
| February 13, 2021; 8:00 pm, P12N | | at Stanford | L 66–73 | 9-8 (6-7) | 18 – Allen | 11 – Carlson | 3 – Tied | Maples Pavilion (1); Stanford, CA |
| February 18, 2021; 6:30 pm, P12N | | at Oregon State | L 56–74 | 9-9 (6-8) | 24 – Allen | 9 – Allen | 5 – Allen | Gill Coliseum (0); Corvallis, OR |
| February 20, 2021; 7:00 pm, P12N | | at Oregon | L 64-67 | 9-10 (6-9) | 17 – Plummer | 9 – Carlson | 5 – Larsson | Matthew Knight Arena (0); Eugene, OR |
| February 25, 2021; 6:00 pm, P12N | | UCLA | L 61–76 | 9-11 (6-10) | 17 – Carlson | 6 – Carlson | 7 – Jones | Jon M. Huntsman Center (0); Salt Lake City, UT |
| February 27, 2021; 6:00 pm, ESPN2 | | No. 19 USC | W 71-61 | 10-11 (7-10) | 19 – Plummer | 7 – Jantunen | 8 – Allen | Jon M. Huntsman Center (0); Salt Lake City, UT |
| March 3, 2021; 5:00 pm, ESPNU | | Oregon State | L 70–75 | 10–12 (7–11) | 23 – Allen | 7 – Jantunen | 6 – Allen | Jon M. Huntsman Center (0); Salt Lake City, UT |
| March 6, 2021; 12:00 pm, FS1 | | Arizona State | W 98–59 | 11–12 (8–11) | 15 – Tied | 8 – Carlson | 8 – Allen | Jon M. Huntsman Center (0); Salt Lake City, UT |
Pac-12 tournament
| March 10, 2021; 5:00 pm, P12N | (7) | vs. (10) Washington; First round | W 98–95 | 12–12 | 24 – Allen | 11 – Allen | 4 – Tied | T-Mobile Arena (0); Paradise, NV |
| March 11, 2021; 6:30 pm, P12N | (7) | vs. (2) No. 24 USC; Quarterfinals | L 85–91 ^{2OT} | 12–13 | 20 – Allen | 13 – Allen | 3 – Allen | T-Mobile Arena (0); Paradise, NV |
*Non-conference game. ^{#}Rankings from AP Poll. (#) Tournament seedings in parentheses. All times are in Mountain Time.
