= 2020–21 Stanford Cardinal men's basketball team =

American college basketball season

2020–21 Stanford Cardinal men's basketball
- Conference: Pac-12 Conference
- Record: 14–13 (10–10 Pac-12)
- Head coach: Jerod Haase (5th season)
- Assistant coaches: Jeff Wulbrun; Adam Cohen; Jesse Pruitt
- Home arena: Kaiser Permanente Arena (Capacity: 2,505); Maples Pavilion (Capacity: 7,392)

2020–21 Pac-12 Conference men's basketball standings
| | Conf. | | | | Overall |
| Team | W | | L | PCT | W | | L | PCT |
|---|---|---|---|---|---|---|---|---|
| Oregon | 14 | – | 4 | .778 | 21 | – | 7 | .750 |
| No. 23 USC | 15 | – | 5 | .750 | 25 | – | 8 | .758 |
| No. 22 Colorado | 14 | – | 6 | .700 | 23 | – | 9 | .719 |
| UCLA | 13 | – | 6 | .684 | 22 | – | 10 | .688 |
| Arizona* | 11 | – | 9 | .550 | 17 | – | 9 | .654 |
| Oregon State † | 10 | – | 10 | .500 | 20 | – | 13 | .606 |
| Stanford | 10 | – | 10 | .500 | 14 | – | 13 | .519 |
| Utah | 8 | – | 11 | .421 | 12 | – | 13 | .480 |
| Arizona State | 7 | – | 10 | .412 | 11 | – | 14 | .440 |
| Washington State | 7 | – | 12 | .368 | 14 | – | 13 | .519 |
| Washington | 4 | – | 16 | .200 | 5 | – | 21 | .192 |
| California | 3 | – | 17 | .150 | 9 | – | 20 | .310 |
† Conference tournament winner *Ineligible for the conference and NCAA tournaments due to self-imposed postseason ban. Rankings from AP poll

The 2020–21 Stanford Cardinal men's basketball team represented Stanford University during the 2020–21 NCAA Division I men's basketball season. The Cardinal were led by fifth year head coach Jerod Haase and are a member of the Pac-12 Conference. They originally planned to play their home games at Maples Pavilion, but due to COVID-19 regulations by Santa Clara County, California, they cancelled five games and then moved the rest of their home games to Kaiser Permanente Arena in Santa Cruz, California.

== Previous season ==
The Cardinal finished the 2019–20 season 20–11, 9–9 in Pac-12 play to finish in seventh place. They lost in the first round of the Pac-12 tournament to the tenth seed California 63–51, finishing their year because of the COVID-19 pandemic, cancelling post-season tournaments.

== Offseason ==
=== Departures ===
| Name | Pos. | Height | Weight | Year | Hometown | Reason for departure |
|---|---|---|---|---|---|---|
| Rodney Herenton | G | 6'1" | 185 | Senior | Chicago, IL | Graduated |
| Kodye Pugh | F | 6'8" | 205 | RS Junior | Baltimore, MD | Grad transfer to Loyola Marymount |
| Isaac White | G | 6'2" | 180 | Junior | Adelaide, Australia | Graduated, signed with The Hawks (NBL) |
| Tyrell Terry | G | 6'1" | 160 | Freshman | Minneapolis, MN | Declared for 2020 NBA draft. |

=== 2020 recruiting class ===
College recruiting
| Name | Hometown | School | Height | Weight | Commit date |
|---|---|---|---|---|---|
| Max Murrell; PF | Omaha, NE | Millard North (NE) | 6 ft 9 in (2.06 m) | 195 lb (88 kg) | Sep 9, 2019 |
| Max Murrell; PF | Recruit ratings: Rivals: 247Sports: ESPN: (79) | | | | |
| Brandon Angel; SF | San Diego, CA | Torrey Pines (CA) | 6 ft 8 in (2.03 m) | 200 lb (91 kg) | Sep 30, 2019 |
| Brandon Angel; SF | Recruit ratings: Rivals: 247Sports: ESPN: (75) | | | | |
| Noah Taitz; SG | Las Vegas, NV | Bishop Gorman (NV) | 6 ft 3 in (1.91 m) | 175 lb (79 kg) | Oct 5, 2019 |
| Noah Taitz; SG | Recruit ratings: Rivals: 247Sports: ESPN: (81) | | | | |
| Ziaire Williams; SF | Lancaster, CA | Sierra Canyon (CA) | 6 ft 8 in (2.03 m) | 180 lb (82 kg) | Apr 12, 2020 |
| Ziaire Williams; SF | Recruit ratings: Rivals: 247Sports: ESPN: (95) | | | | |
| Michael O'Connell; PG | Mineola, NY | Blair Academy (NJ) | 6 ft 2 in (1.88 m) | 175 lb (79 kg) | Jun 1, 2020 |
| Michael O'Connell; PG | Recruit ratings: Rivals: 247Sports: | | | | |
Overall recruit ranking: Rivals: 15 247Sports: 11 ESPN: 10
Note: In many cases, Scout, Rivals, 247Sports, On3, and ESPN may conflict in their listings of height and weight.; In these cases, the average was taken. ESPN grades are on a 100-point scale.; Sources: "Stanford 2020 Basketball Commitments". Rivals.; "2020 Stanford Cardinal Recruiting Class". ESPN.; "2020 Team Ranking". Rivals.

=== 2021 Recruiting class ===
College recruiting (2021)
| Name | Hometown | School | Height | Weight | Commit date |
|---|---|---|---|---|---|
| Isa Silva; PG | Sacramento, CA | Prolific Prep (CA) | 6 ft 3 in (1.91 m) | 185 lb (84 kg) | Apr 21, 2020 |
| Isa Silva; PG | Recruit ratings: Rivals: 247Sports: ESPN: (85) | | | | |
| Harrison Ingram; SF | Dallas, TX | St. Mark's School (TX) | 6 ft 7 in (2.01 m) | 210 lb (95 kg) | Sep 18, 2020 |
| Harrison Ingram; SF | Recruit ratings: Rivals: 247Sports: ESPN: (90) | | | | |
Overall recruit ranking: Rivals: 12 247Sports: 30 ESPN: —
Note: In many cases, Scout, Rivals, 247Sports, On3, and ESPN may conflict in their listings of height and weight.; In these cases, the average was taken. ESPN grades are on a 100-point scale.; Sources: "Stanford 2021 Basketball Commitments". Rivals.; "2021 Stanford Cardinal Recruiting Class". ESPN.; "2021 Team Ranking". Rivals.

== Roster ==
2020–21 Stanford Cardinal men's basketball team
Players
Coaches

| Pos. | # | Name | Height | Weight | Year | Previous school | Hometown |
|---|---|---|---|---|---|---|---|
| F | 0 | Neal Begovich | 6 ft 9 in (2.06 m) | 225 lb (102 kg) | RS Fr | St. Ignatius College Prep | San Francisco, CA |
| G | 1 | Daejon Davis | 6 ft 3 in (1.91 m) | 190 lb (86 kg) | Sr | Garfield | Seattle, WA |
| G | 2 | Bryce Wills | 6 ft 6 in (1.98 m) | 205 lb (93 kg) | Jr | Iona Preparatory School | White Plains, NY |
| F | 3 | Ziaire Williams | 6 ft 8 in (2.03 m) | 185 lb (84 kg) | Fr | Sierra Canyon | Lancaster, CA |
| G | 5 | Michael O'Connell | 6 ft 2 in (1.88 m) | 185 lb (84 kg) | Fr | Blair Academy | Mineola, NY |
| F | 10 | Max Murrell | 6 ft 9 in (2.06 m) | 210 lb (95 kg) | Fr | Millard North | Omaha, NE |
| F | 11 | Jaiden Delaire | 6 ft 9 in (2.06 m) | 210 lb (95 kg) | Jr | Loomis Chaffee School | North Granby, CT |
| C | 12 | Keenan Fitzmorris | 7 ft 0 in (2.13 m) | 230 lb (104 kg) | RS So | New Hampton School | Overland Park, KS |
| F | 13 | Oscar da Silva | 6 ft 9 in (2.06 m) | 230 lb (104 kg) | Sr | Ludwig Gymnasium | Munich, Germany |
| F | 14 | Spencer Jones | 6 ft 7 in (2.01 m) | 225 lb (102 kg) | So | Bishop Miege | Roeland Park, KS |
| G | 20 | Noah Taitz | 6 ft 3 in (1.91 m) | 185 lb (84 kg) | Fr | Bishop Gorman | Las Vegas, NV |
| G | 21 | Daniel Begovich | 6 ft 5 in (1.96 m) | 205 lb (93 kg) | Sr | St. Ignatius College Prep | San Francisco, CA |
| F | 22 | James Keefe | 6 ft 9 in (2.06 m) | 225 lb (102 kg) | So | Loyola | Los Angeles, CA |
| F | 23 | Brandon Angel | 6 ft 8 in (2.03 m) | 215 lb (98 kg) | Fr | Torrey Pines | San Diego, CA |
| G | 24 | Sam Beskind | 6 ft 4 in (1.93 m) | 190 lb (86 kg) | RS So | Catalina Foothills | Tucson, AZ |
| F | 32 | Lukas Kišūnas | 6 ft 10 in (2.08 m) | 260 lb (118 kg) | Jr | Brewster Academy | Vilnius, Lithuania |

Head coach

- Jerod Haase (Kansas)

Assistant coach(es)

- Jeff Wulbrun (Cal State Fullerton)
- Adam Cohen (Arizona)
- Jesse Pruitt (UC Davis)

Legend

- (C) Team captain
- (S) Suspended
- (I) Ineligible
- (W) Walk-on
- Injured
- Current redshirt

Roster

== Schedule and results ==
| Date time, TV | Rank^{#} | Opponent^{#} | Result | Record | High points | High rebounds | High assists | Site (attendance) city, state |
Regular season
| November 25, 2020*; 2:00 pm, P12N | | Utah Valley; Canceled due to regulations from COVID-19. | | | | | | Maples Pavilion; Stanford, CA |
| November 30, 2020*; 6:30 pm, ESPN2 | | vs. Alabama; Maui Invitational Quarterfinals | W 82–64 | 1–0 | 19 – Williams | 8 – Tied | 4 – Davis | Harrah's Cherokee Center (0); Asheville, NC |
| December 1, 2020*; 1:00 pm, ESPN | | vs. No. 14 North Carolina; Maui Invitational semifinals | L 63–67 | 1–1 | 18 – Davis | 5 – Jones | 4 – Davis | Harrah's Cherokee Center (0); Asheville, NC |
| December 2, 2020*; 10:30 am, ESPN | | vs. Indiana; Maui Invitational 3rd place game | L 63–79 | 1–2 | 18 – Davis | 5 – Keefe | 3 – da Silva | Harrah's Cherokee Center (0); Asheville, NC |
| December 6, 2020*; 11:00 am | | at North Carolina A&T | W 78–46 | 2–2 | 26 – da Silva | 10 – Tied | 4 – Tied | Corbett Sports Center (0); Greensboro, NC |
| December 15, 2020*; 2:00 pm, ESPN3 | | at Cal State Northridge | W 82–71 | 3–2 | 32 – da Silva | 9 – da Silva | 3 – Tied | Matadome (0); Northridge, CA |
| December 19, 2020; 4:00 pm, P12N | | Arizona | W 78–75 | 4–2 (1–0) | 21 – da Silva | 7 – Tied | 7 – Davis | Kaiser Permanente Arena (0); Santa Cruz, CA |
| December 21, 2020*; 6:00 pm, P12N | | Cal State Bakersfield | W 63–50 | 5–2 | 17 – Williams | 7 – Tied | 3 – Tied | Kaiser Permanente Arena (30); Santa Cruz, CA |
| January 2, 2021; 7:00 pm, ESPNU | | at No. 21 Oregon | L 56–73 | 5–3 (1–1) | 12 – Tied | 7 – Delaire | 6 – Wills | Matthew Knight Arena (0); Eugene, OR |
| January 4, 2020; 12:00 pm, P12N | | at Oregon State | W 81–71 | 6–3 (2–1) | 31 – da Silva | 10 – da Silva | 8 – O'Connell | Gill Coliseum (0); Corvallis, OR |
| January 7, 2021; 6:00 pm , FS1 | | Washington | W 91–75 | 7–3 (3–1) | 21 – Delaire | 12 – Williams | 10 – Williams | Kaiser Permanente Arena (1); Santa Cruz, CA |
| January 9, 2021; 2:00 pm, P12N | | Washington State | W 75–60 | 8–3 (4–1) | 27 – da Silva | 13 – da Silva | 3 – Jones | Kaiser Permanente Arena (1); Santa Cruz, CA |
| January 13, 2021; 8:00 pm, ESPNU | | at Utah | L 65–79 | 8–4 (4–2) | 19 – Davis | 5 – Tied | 3 – da Silva | Jon M. Huntsman Center (0); Salt Lake City, UT |
| January 16, 2021; 12:00 pm, P12N | | at Colorado | L 64–77 | 8–5 (4–3) | 22 – da Silva | 12 – da Silva | 2 – Tied | Coors Events Center (0); Boulder, CO |
| January 23, 2021; 2:00 pm, FOX | | No. 24 UCLA | W 73–72 ^{OT} | 9–5 (5–3) | 26 – da Silva | 7 – Kisunas | 5 – O'Connell | Kaiser Permanente Arena (1); Santa Cruz, CA |
| January 28, 2021; 7:00 pm, ESPN2 | | at Arizona | W 73–64 | 10–5 (6–3) | 21 – Delaire | 6 – Jones | 4 – O'Connell | McKale Center (0); Tucson, AZ |
| January 30, 2021; 5:00 pm, ESPN2 | | at Arizona State | L 75–79 | 10–6 (6–4) | 21 – Delaire | 11 – da Silva | 4 – da Silva | Desert Financial Arena (0); Tempe, AZ |
| February 2, 2021; 6:00 pm, FS1 | | USC | L 66–72 | 10–7 (6–5) | 22 – Delaire | 7 – Kisunas | 4 – O'Connell | Maples Pavilion (1); Stanford, CA |
| February 4, 2021; 6:00 pm, ESPN2 | | at California | W 70–55 | 11–7 (7–5) | 24 – da Silva | 11 – da Silva | 4 – Tied | Haas Pavilion (0); Berkeley, CA |
| February 7, 2021; 7:00 pm, FS1 | | California | W 76–70 | 12–7 (8–5) | 23 – da Silva | 9 – O'Connell | 2 – Tied | Maples Pavilion (1); Stanford, CA |
| February 11, 2021; 4:00 pm, ESPN2 | | Colorado | L 51–69 | 12–8 (8–6) | 22 – da Silva | 6 – da Silva | 3 – O'Connell | Maples Pavilion (0); Stanford, CA |
| February 13, 2021; 7:00 pm, P12N | | Utah | W 73–66 | 13–8 (9–6) | 17 – Jones | 8 – Kisunas | 5 – Davis | Maples Pavilion (1); Stanford, CA |
| February 18, 2021; 8:00 pm, FS1 | | at Washington | W 79–61 | 14–8 (10–6) | 18 – da Silva | 6 – da Silva | 5 – O'Connell | Alaska Airlines Arena (0); Seattle, WA |
| February 20, 2021; 1:00 pm, ESPN2 | | at Washington State | L 76–85 ^{3OT} | 14–9 (10–7) | 17 – O'Connell | 6 – Tied | 7 – O'Connell | Beasley Coliseum (200); Pullman, WA |
| February 25, 2021; 6:00 pm, ESPNU | | Oregon | L 68–71 | 14–10 (10–8) | 15 – Delaire | 7 – Wills | 5 – O'Connell | Maples Pavilion (1); Stanford, CA |
| February 27, 2021; 3:30 pm, P12N | | Oregon State | L 62–73 | 14–11 (10–9) | 14 – Williams | 8 – Kisunas | 4 – Wills | Maples Pavilion (1); Stanford, CA |
| March 3, 2021; 7:30 pm, FS1 | | at USC | L 42–79 | 14–12 (10–10) | 9 – Tied | 8 – Delaire | 2 – Tied | Galen Center (0); Los Angeles, CA |
Pac-12 tournament
| March 2021; 7:00 pm, P12N | (6) | vs. (11) California; First round | L 58–76 | 14–13 | 14 – Delaire | 7 – Kisunas | 3 – O'Connell | T-Mobile Arena (0); Paradise, NV |
*Non-conference game. ^{#}Rankings from AP Poll. (#) Tournament seedings in parentheses. All times are in Pacific Time.
