= Ethan Thompson =

American basketball player (born 1999)

- Thompson with Partizan in 2026

No. 5 – Partizan Belgrade
- Position: Shooting guard / small forward
- League: Serbian SuperLeague; ABA League; EuroLeague

Personal information
- Born: May 4, 1999 (age 27) Harbor City, California, U.S.
- Listed height: 6 ft 4 in (1.93 m)
- Listed weight: 195 lb (88 kg)

Career information
- High school: Bishop Montgomery (Torrance, California)
- College: Oregon State (2017–2021)
- NBA draft: 2021: undrafted
- Playing career: 2021–present

Career history
- 2021–2023: Windy City Bulls
- 2023–2024: Mexico City Capitanes
- 2024: Osos de Manatí
- 2024–2025: Osceola Magic
- 2025: Sioux Falls Skyforce
- 2025–2026: Indiana Pacers
- 2025–2026: →Noblesville Boom
- 2026–present: Partizan

Career highlights
- All-NBA G League Third Team (2024); 2x NBA G League Next Up Game (2024, 2026); First-team All-Pac-12 (2021); California Mr. Basketball (2017)
- Stats at NBA.com
- Stats at Basketball Reference

Ethan Ivan Thompson (born May 4, 1999) is a Puerto Rican professional basketball player for Partizan Belgrade of the Serbian SuperLeague, the ABA League, and the EuroLeague. Listed at 6 feet 4 inches (1.93 m), he plays the shooting guard and small forward positions. He played college basketball for the Oregon State Beavers and represents the Puerto Rican national team.

== High school career ==
Thompson played on Bishop Montgomery's varsity team for all 4 years during his high school career. As a senior at Bishop Montgomery he averaged 22.8 points, 7.7 rebounds, and 5.4 assists while also leading his team to the CIF Open Division State Championship. Bishop Montgomery beat Chino Hills, who were led by LaMelo Ball and his brother LiAngelo, in the regional semi-finals, and beat Mater Dei in the regional final before beating Woodcreek to win the state title. Thompson participated in the Ballislife All-American Game on May 6, 2017. He led the game in scoring with 32 points on 14-of-18 shooting.

=== Recruiting ===
On November 9, 2016, Thompson signed his National Letter of Intent to play for Oregon State, as he quoted, "I chose to attend OSU because I was impressed with the basketball facility, the coaching staff and the character of my future teammates. The opportunity to contribute as a freshman was appealing to me."

College recruiting
Name	Hometown	School	Height	Weight	Commit date
Ethan Thompson; SG	Los Angeles, CA	Bishop Montgomery (CA)	6 ft 5 in (1.96 m)	195 lb (88 kg)	Sep 19, 2016
Ethan Thompson; SG	Recruit ratings: Scout: Rivals: 247Sports: ESPN: (88)				
Overall recruit ranking: Scout: 49 Rivals: 36 247Sports: 25 ESPN: 41
Note: In many cases, Scout, Rivals, 247Sports, On3, and ESPN may conflict in their listings of height and weight.; In these cases, the average was taken. ESPN grades are on a 100-point scale.; Sources: "Oregon State 2017 Basketball Commitments". Rivals.; "2017 Oregon State Beavers Recruiting Class". ESPN.; "2017 Team Ranking". Rivals.

== College career ==
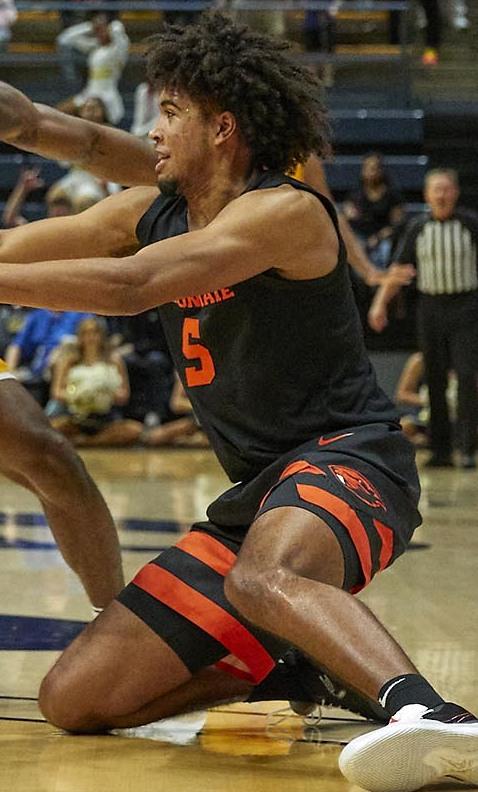
Thompson with Oregon State in 2020

In his college debut against Southern Utah, Thompson scored 20 points, had 5 assists and grabbed 8 rebounds. On March 3, 2018, he scored a season-high 23 points in a 92–67 win over Washington State.

After his sophomore season, Thompson declared for the 2019 NBA draft. However, he withdrew from the draft on May 29, 2019, and returned to Oregon State for his junior season.

As a junior, Thompson started 31 games and finished second on the Beavers in scoring at 14.8 points a game, while leading the team in assists at 4.5 per game. Following the season, he declared for the 2020 NBA draft but did not hire an agent.

== Professional career ==
=== Windy City Bulls (2021–2023) ===
After going undrafted in the 2021 NBA draft, Thompson joined the Chicago Bulls for the 2021 NBA Summer League. On September 8, 2021, he signed with the Bulls, but was waived on October 11. Thompson joined the Windy City Bulls as an affiliate player.

=== Mexico City Capitanes (2023–2024) ===
On October 30, 2023, Thompson signed with the Mexico City Capitanes of the NBA G League.

=== Osos de Manatí (2024) ===
On March 2, 2024, Thompson was selected first overall in the 2024 BSN draft by the Osos de Manatí.

=== Osceola Magic (2024–2025) ===
On September 20, 2024, Thompson signed with the Orlando Magic, but was waived on October 19. Eight days later, he joined the Osceola Magic.

On February 7, 2025, Thompson signed a two-way contract with the Orlando Magic where he split time with the NBA club and its G-League affiliate. However, he did not appear for Orlando during his time with the team. On July 23, Thompson was waived by the Magic.

=== Sioux Falls Skyforce (2025) ===
On August 14, 2025, Thompson signed an Exhibit 10 contract with the Miami Heat. He was waived by the Heat prior to the start of the regular season on October 17. He would sign with the Heat’s G-League affiliate, the Sioux Falls Skyforce. In his eight games with the Skyforce he averaged 26.9 points, 5.8 rebounds and 6.5 assists per game.

=== Indiana Pacers / Noblesville Boom (2025–2026) ===
On December 1, 2025, Thompson signed a two-way contract with the Indiana Pacers. Thompson made his NBA debut against the Cleveland Cavaliers that day, scoring his first career points on a jump shot in the 4th quarter. On December 5, Thompson would score a career-high 11 points, while also registering two rebounds, three assists, one steal, and two blocks. On December 8, Thompson would make his first career start against the Sacramento Kings; he finished the game with six points and five rebounds. On April 1, 2026, Thompson scored a career high 24 points on 8-of-15 shooting from the field, and added 5 assists in an 145–126 victory against the Chicago Bulls.

=== Partizan (2026–present) ===
On August 16, 2026, Thompson signed a two-year deal with Partizan of the Serbian SuperLeague, the ABA League, and the EuroLeague.

== National team career ==
Thompson played for Puerto Rico at the 2016 FIBA Americas Under-18 Championship. Thompson averaged 11.8 points, 6.2 rebounds and 1.8 assists per game in the tournament.

== Career statistics ==
Legend
GP	Games played	GS	Games started	MPG	Minutes per game
FG%	Field goal percentage	3P%	3-point field goal percentage	FT%	Free throw percentage
RPG	Rebounds per game	APG	Assists per game	SPG	Steals per game
BPG	Blocks per game	PPG	Points per game	**Bold**	Career high

=== NBA ===
Year	Team	GP	GS	MPG	FG%	3P%	FT%	RPG	APG	SPG	BPG	PPG
2025–26	Indiana	32	13	20.4	.378	.328	.787	2.2	1.8	.6	.3	7.0
Career		32	13	20.4	.378	.328	.787	2.2	1.8	.6	.3	7.0

=== College ===
Year	Team	GP	GS	MPG	FG%	3P%	FT%	RPG	APG	SPG	BPG	PPG
2017–18	Oregon State	32	32	32.2	.383	.333	.731	4.1	3.5	.7	.4	9.9
2018–19	Oregon State	31	31	34.4	.444	**.359**	.797	**5.0**	3.9	.9	**.5**	13.7
2019–20	Oregon State	31	31	**35.4**	**.458**	.333	.742	4.2	**4.5**	**1.3**	.2	14.8
2020–21	Oregon State	**33**	**33**	33.6	.404	.329	**.813**	4.0	3.9	1.2	.4	**15.7**
Career		127	127	33.9	.424	.338	.776	4.3	3.9	1.0	.3	13.5

== Personal life ==
Thompson's father, NBA veteran Stephen, is an assistant coach for Oregon State basketball. Thompson's brother, Stevie, played for Oregon State from 2015 to 2019.

== See also ==
- List of second-generation NBA players
