= 2022 NBA All-Star Game =

71st edition of the NBA All-Star Game

	1	2	3	4	Total
Team Durant	45	49	45	21	160
Team LeBron	47	46	45	25	163
- Date: February 20, 2022
- Arena: Rocket Mortgage FieldHouse
- City: Cleveland
- MVP: Stephen Curry (Team LeBron)
- National anthem: Macy Gray (American); Ryland James (Canadian)
- Halftime show: 75th Anniversary Team recognition Earth, Wind and Fire
- Network: TNT and TBS
- Announcers: Kevin Harlan, Reggie Miller, Dwyane Wade, and Allie LaForce (All-Star Game, TNT); Ernie Johnson, Shaquille O'Neal, Kenny Smith, Charles Barkley, and Draymond Green (Inside the All-Star Game, TBS); Brian Anderson, Reggie Miller, Dwyane Wade, Kenny Smith, and Stephanie Ready (All-Star Saturday Night); Adam Lefkoe, Grant Hill, Brendan Haywood, and Chris Haynes (Rising Stars Tournament)
Team Durant	Team LeBron

NBA All-Star Game
< 2021	2023 >

The 2022 NBA All-Star Game was an exhibition game played on February 20, 2022, during the National Basketball Association's 2021–22 season. It was the 71st edition of the NBA All-Star Game. The game was hosted by the Cleveland Cavaliers at Rocket Mortgage FieldHouse in Cleveland, Ohio. This was the third time that the Cleveland area hosted the All-Star Game, the first being in 1981 at the Coliseum in nearby Richfield, Ohio, and most recently in 1997—three years after the Cavaliers moved back to downtown Cleveland to play in the newly built Gund Arena, which is now known as Rocket Arena. Coincidentally, on the occasion Cleveland hosted an All-Star Game, the NBA celebrated its 35th season (1981), 50th anniversary (1997), and 75th anniversary (2022). The announcement of the site selection was made on November 1, 2018, at a press conference held by the Cleveland Cavaliers.

With teams captained by LeBron James and Kevin Durant, Team LeBron won the game 163–160. Team LeBron's Stephen Curry, who scored 50 points, set the record for most three-pointers made in an All-Star quarter (6), half (8), and game (16), and was also named the All-Star Game Kobe Bryant Most Valuable Player. This was Team LeBron's fifth consecutive All-Star win.

== All-Star Game ==
=== Coaches ===
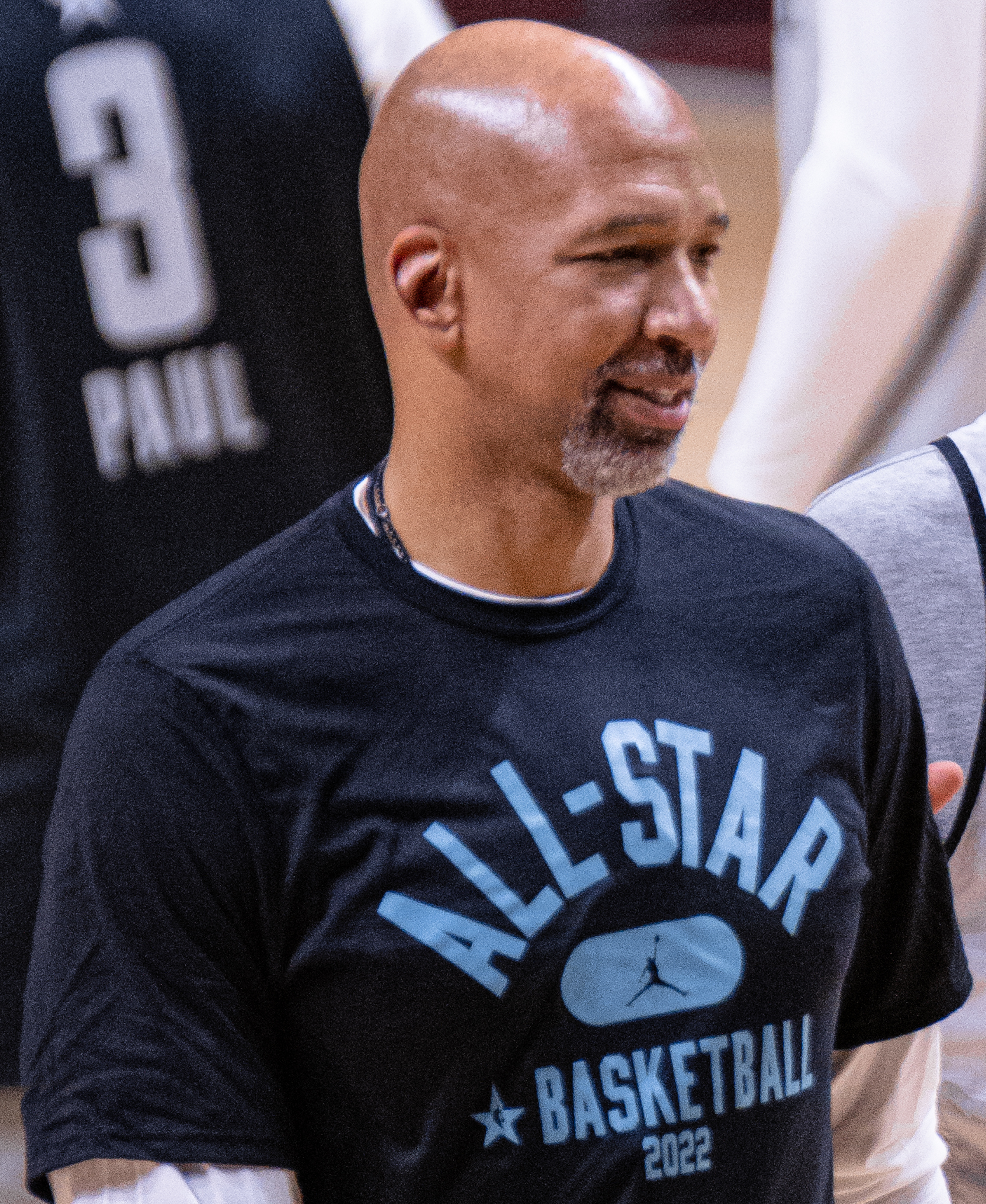
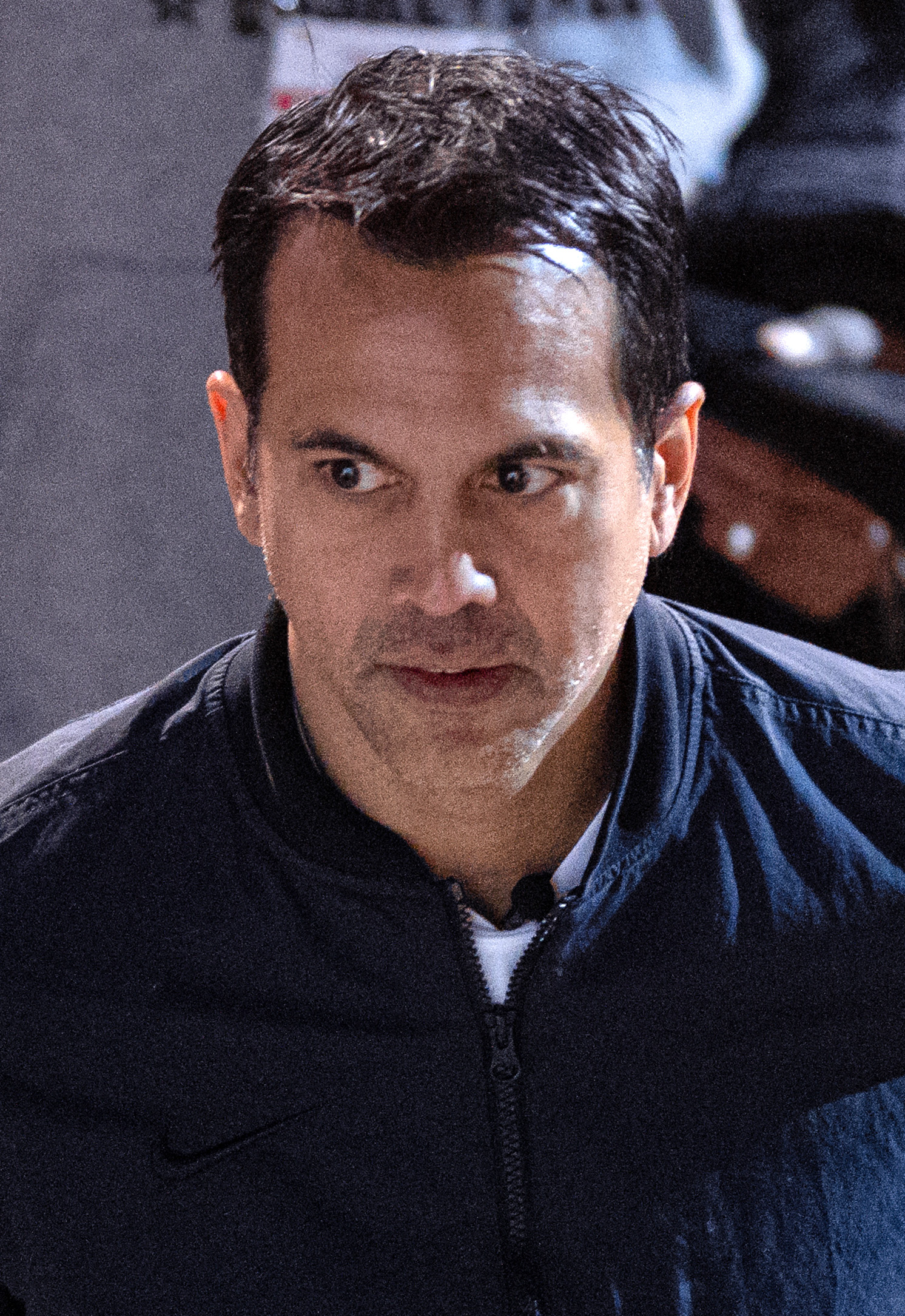
Phoenix Suns' Monty Williams (left) and Miami Heat's Erik Spoelstra (right) were selected as head coach for Team LeBron and Team Durant, respectively.

The two teams were coached from their team captain's respective conference. Monty Williams, head coach of the Western Conference leader Phoenix Suns, qualified as the head coach of Team LeBron on January 30. Erik Spoelstra, head coach of the Eastern Conference leader Miami Heat, qualified as the head coach of Team Durant on February 6.

=== Rosters ===
As had been the case in previous years, the rosters for the All-Star Game were selected through a voting process. The fans could vote through the NBA website and the NBA App. The starters were chosen by the fans, media, and current NBA players. Fans made up 50% of the vote, and NBA players and media each comprised 25% of the vote. The two guards and three frontcourt players who received the highest cumulative vote totals in each conferences were named the All-Star starters and two players in each conferences with the highest votes were named team captains. NBA head coaches voted for the reserves for their respective conferences, none of which could be players from their own team. Each coach selected two guards, three frontcourt players and two wild cards, with each selected player ranked in order of preference within each category. If a multi-position player was to be selected, coaches were encouraged to vote for the player at the position that was "most advantageous for the All-Star team", regardless of where the player was listed on the All-Star ballot or the position he was listed in box scores.

The All-Star Game starters were announced on January 27, 2022. Trae Young of the Atlanta Hawks and DeMar DeRozan of the Chicago Bulls were named the backcourt starters in the East, earning their second and fifth all-star appearances, respectively. Kevin Durant of the Brooklyn Nets and Giannis Antetokounmpo of the Milwaukee Bucks were named the frontcourt starters in the East, earning their 12th and sixth all-star appearances, respectively. Joining in the East frontcourt was Joel Embiid of the Philadelphia 76ers, his fifth selection.

Ja Morant of the Memphis Grizzlies and Stephen Curry of the Golden State Warriors were named to the starting backcourt in the West, earning their first and eighth all-star appearances, respectively. In the frontcourt, Andrew Wiggins of the Golden State Warriors and LeBron James of the Los Angeles Lakers were named to their first and 18th all-star selections, respectively. Joining them was reigning MVP Nikola Jokić of the Denver Nuggets, in his fourth all-star selection. Wiggins was the third first-time All-Star to be voted a starter in his eighth season or later. (Note: The first two were Bob Boozer (eighth season, 1968) and Kyle Lowry (ninth, 2015)) He also became the first No. 1 overall draft pick in the modern draft era (since 1966) to earn their first All-Star selection in their eighth season or later.

The All-Star Game reserves were announced on February 3, 2022. The West reserves included Devin Booker of the Phoenix Suns, his third selection (and first as a non-replacement player); Luka Dončić of the Dallas Mavericks, his third selection; Rudy Gobert of the Utah Jazz, his third selection; Draymond Green of the Golden State Warriors, his fourth selection; Donovan Mitchell of the Utah Jazz, his third selection; Chris Paul of the Phoenix Suns, his 12th selection; and Karl-Anthony Towns of the Minnesota Timberwolves, his third selection.

The East reserves included Jimmy Butler of the Miami Heat, his sixth selection; Darius Garland of the Cleveland Cavaliers, his first selection; James Harden of the Philadelphia 76ers, his tenth selection; Zach LaVine of the Chicago Bulls, his second selection; Khris Middleton of the Milwaukee Bucks, his third selection; Jayson Tatum of the Boston Celtics, his third selection; Fred VanVleet of the Toronto Raptors, his first selection; and Jarrett Allen of the Cleveland Cavaliers, his first selection, as an injury replacement for James Harden.

Eastern Conference All-Stars
Pos	Player	Team	No. of selections
Starters
G	Trae Young	Atlanta Hawks	2
G	DeMar DeRozan	Chicago Bulls	5
C	Joel Embiid	Philadelphia 76ers	5
F	Kevin Durant^{INJ1}	Brooklyn Nets	12
F	Giannis Antetokounmpo	Milwaukee Bucks	6
Reserves
G	LaMelo Ball^{REP1}	Charlotte Hornets	1
G	Darius Garland	Cleveland Cavaliers	1
G	James Harden^{INJ3}	Philadelphia 76ers^{NOTE1}	10
G	Zach LaVine	Chicago Bulls	2
G	Fred VanVleet	Toronto Raptors	1
F	Jimmy Butler	Miami Heat	6
F	Khris Middleton	Milwaukee Bucks	3
F	Jayson Tatum^{ST}	Boston Celtics	3
C	Jarrett Allen^{REP3}	Cleveland Cavaliers	1

Western Conference All-Stars
Pos	Player	Team	No. of selections
Starters
G	Stephen Curry	Golden State Warriors	8
G	Ja Morant	Memphis Grizzlies	1
C	Nikola Jokić	Denver Nuggets	4
F	LeBron James	Los Angeles Lakers	18
F	Andrew Wiggins	Golden State Warriors	1
Reserves
G	Devin Booker	Phoenix Suns	3
G	Luka Dončić	Dallas Mavericks	3
G	Donovan Mitchell	Utah Jazz	3
G	Dejounte Murray^{REP2}	San Antonio Spurs	1
G	Chris Paul	Phoenix Suns	12
F	Draymond Green^{INJ2}	Golden State Warriors	4
C	Rudy Gobert	Utah Jazz	3
C	Karl-Anthony Towns	Minnesota Timberwolves	3

Notes

Italics indicates leading vote-getters per conference.

^INJ1 Kevin Durant was unable to play due to a knee injury.
^REP1 LaMelo Ball was selected as Kevin Durant's replacement.
^INJ2 Draymond Green was unable to play due to a lower disc injury.
^REP2 Dejounte Murray was selected as Draymond Green's replacement.
^ST Jayson Tatum was selected to start in place of Durant.
^INJ3 James Harden was unable to play due to a hamstring injury, but was present for the halftime ceremony.
^REP3 Jarrett Allen was selected as James Harden's replacement.
^NOTE1 After being announced as an All-Star, James Harden was traded from the Brooklyn Nets to the Philadelphia 76ers.

=== Draft ===
The NBA-All Star draft took place on February 10, 2022. LeBron James and Kevin Durant were named captains for the second straight year, as they both received the most votes from the West and East, respectively. The first eight players to be drafted were starters. The next 14 players, chosen by NBA head coaches (seven from each conference), were then drafted. NBA Commissioner Adam Silver selected replacements for any player unable to participate in the All-Star Game, choosing a player from the same conference as the player who was being replaced. Silver's selection joined the team that drafted the replaced player. If a replaced player is a starter, the head coach of that team would choose a new starter from their cast of players. James picked Giannis Antetokounmpo with his first pick, and Durant picked Joel Embiid second. Team Durant was the home team due to the Eastern Conference having home team status for the game.

2022 All-Star Draft
Pick	Player	Team
1	Giannis Antetokounmpo	LeBron
2	Joel Embiid	Durant
3	Stephen Curry	LeBron
4	Ja Morant	Durant
5	DeMar DeRozan	LeBron
6	Jayson Tatum	Durant
7	Nikola Jokić	LeBron
8	Andrew Wiggins	Durant
9	Trae Young	Durant
10	Devin Booker	Durant
11	Luka Dončić	LeBron
12	Karl-Anthony Towns	Durant
13	Darius Garland	LeBron
14	Zach LaVine	Durant
15	Chris Paul	LeBron
16	Dejounte Murray	Durant
17	Jimmy Butler	LeBron
18	Khris Middleton	Durant
19	Donovan Mitchell	LeBron
20	LaMelo Ball	Durant
21	Fred VanVleet	LeBron
22	Rudy Gobert	Durant
23	James Harden	LeBron

=== Lineups ===
Team LeBron
Pos	Player	Team
Starters
F	LeBron James	Los Angeles Lakers
F	Giannis Antetokounmpo	Milwaukee Bucks
C	Nikola Jokić	Denver Nuggets
G	DeMar DeRozan	Chicago Bulls
G	Stephen Curry	Golden State Warriors
Reserves
F	Luka Dončić	Dallas Mavericks
G	Darius Garland	Cleveland Cavaliers
G	Chris Paul	Phoenix Suns
F	Jimmy Butler	Miami Heat
G	Donovan Mitchell	Utah Jazz
G	Fred VanVleet	Toronto Raptors
C	Jarrett Allen^{REP3}	Cleveland Cavaliers
Head coach: Monty Williams (Phoenix Suns)

Team Durant
Pos	Player	Team
Starters
F	Andrew Wiggins	Golden State Warriors
F	Jayson Tatum^{ST}	Boston Celtics
C	Joel Embiid	Philadelphia 76ers
G	Ja Morant	Memphis Grizzlies
G	Trae Young	Atlanta Hawks
Reserves
G	Devin Booker	Phoenix Suns
F/C	Karl-Anthony Towns	Minnesota Timberwolves
G	Zach LaVine	Chicago Bulls
G	Dejounte Murray^{REP2}	San Antonio Spurs
F	Khris Middleton	Milwaukee Bucks
G	LaMelo Ball^{REP1}	Charlotte Hornets
C	Rudy Gobert	Utah Jazz
Head coach: Erik Spoelstra (Miami Heat)

=== Game ===
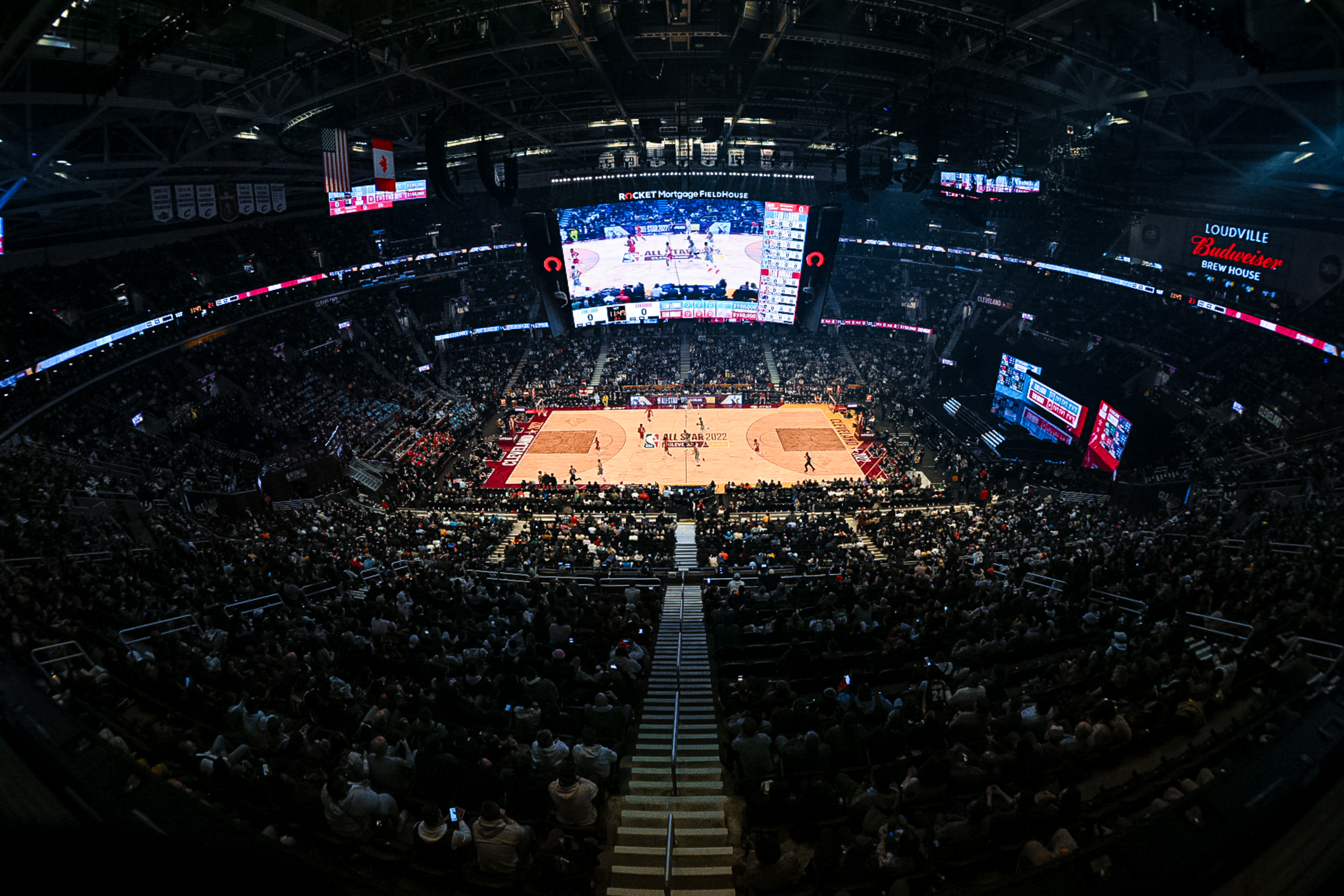
Rocket Mortgage FieldHouse during the game

The 2022 All-Star Game used the same format as the 2020 edition; the team that scores the most points during each of the first three 12-minute quarters received a cash prize, which was donated to a designated charity; the pot would roll over if the teams are tied. The fourth quarter was untimed under the rules of the Elam Ending, in which the first team to meet or exceed a "target score"—the score of the leading team in total scoring after three quarters plus 24—was declared the winner.

After one quarter win each and a tie in the third quarter, LeBron James made a walk-off basket on a turnaround fadeaway jumper to win the game 163–160. Team LeBron's Stephen Curry won the NBA All-Star Game Kobe Bryant Most Valuable Player Award after scoring 50 points, two shy of Anthony Davis's record and 48 of which were made from three-pointers, and setting three-pointers record.

TNT, TBS

February 20, 2022
8:00 pm ET

Box score

Team Durant 160, Team LeBron 163
Scoring by quarter: 45–47, 49–46, 45–45, 21–25
Pts: Joel Embiid 36; Rebs: Joel Embiid 10; Asts: Trae Young 10	Pts: Stephen Curry 50; Rebs: Giannis Antetokounmpo 12; Asts: James, Jokić 8 each

Rocket Mortgage FieldHouse, Cleveland, Ohio
Referees:
- #5 Kane Fitzgerald
- #60 James Williams
- #45 Brian Forte

== All-Star Weekend ==
=== Celebrity Game ===
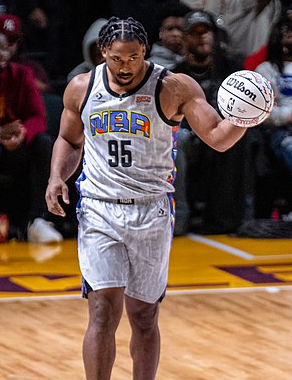
Cleveland Browns defensive end Myles Garrett playing in the celebrity game. The following year, he would buy a minority ownership stake in the Cleveland Cavaliers

The 2022 NBA All-Star Celebrity Game was played on Friday, February 18, 2022, at the Wolstein Center in Cleveland, Ohio. The coaches for the 2022 game were NBA legends Bill Walton and Dominique Wilkins. Team Walton defeated Team Nique 65–51 and Alex Toussaint took home the MVP award with 18 points.

ESPN

February 18, 2022
7:00 pm ET

Team Walton 65, Team Nique 51

Wolstein Center, Cleveland, Ohio

Team Walton
Player	Background
Jimmie Allen	Singer, songwriter
Brittney Elena	Host, actress, athlete and model
Machine Gun Kelly	Rapper, songwriter
Dearica Hamby	WNBA player
Noah Carlock	Fanatics All-In Challenge winner
Kareem Hunt	NFL player
Matt James	ABC's The Bachelor
Quavo (4)	Rapper, recording artist
Ranveer Singh	Actor
Alex Toussaint	Peloton instructor
Anderson Varejão	Former NBA player
Head coach: Bill Walton (NBA legends)

Team Nique
Player	Background
Anuel AA	Singer
Justin Bibb	Mayor of Cleveland
Kane Brown (2)	4x AMA award-winning artist
Myles Garrett	NFL player
Daniel Gibson	Former NBA player
Tiffany Haddish	Comedian, actress and author
Jack Harlow	Rapper, recording artist
Crissa Jackson	Harlem Globetrotters player
Anjali Ranadivé	Singer, songwriter
Gianmarco Tamberi	Olympic high jump champion
Head coach: Dominique Wilkins (NBA legends)

=== NBA HBCU Classic ===
A neutral site Mid-Eastern Athletic Conference (MEAC) college basketball game between the Howard Bison and Morgan State Bears was held on February 19, 2022, at the Wolstein Center as the inaugural NBA HBCU Classic. The NBA and AT&T donated $100,000 to each team's athletic department, and the game was simulcasted by NBA TV, TNT and ESPN2. Howard defeated Morgan State 68–66.

=== Rising Stars Challenge ===
Team Barry
Pos.	Player	Team	R/S/P
G	Cade Cunningham	Detroit Pistons	Rookie
F	Dyson Daniels	NBA G League Ignite	Prospect
F	Evan Mobley	Cleveland Cavaliers	Rookie
G/F	Isaac Okoro	Cleveland Cavaliers	Sophomore
C	Alperen Şengün	Houston Rockets	Rookie
F	Jae'Sean Tate	Houston Rockets	Sophomore
F	Franz Wagner	Orlando Magic	Rookie
Honorary coach: Rick Barry
Head coach: Bryan Gates (Phoenix Suns)

Team Isiah
Pos.	Player	Team	R/S/P
F/C	Precious Achiuwa	Toronto Raptors	Sophomore
G/F	Desmond Bane	Memphis Grizzlies	Sophomore
F	Saddiq Bey	Detroit Pistons	Sophomore
G	Anthony Edwards	Minnesota Timberwolves	Sophomore
G	Tyrese Haliburton	Indiana Pacers	Sophomore
G	Jaden Hardy	NBA G League Ignite	Prospect
C	Isaiah Stewart	Detroit Pistons	Sophomore
Honorary coach: Isiah Thomas
Head coach: Kevin Young (Phoenix Suns)

Team Payton
Pos.	Player	Team	R/S/P
G	LaMelo Ball	Charlotte Hornets	Sophomore
F	Scottie Barnes	Toronto Raptors	Rookie
G	Ayo Dosunmu	Chicago Bulls	Rookie
G	Chris Duarte^{INJ1}	Indiana Pacers	Rookie
G	Scoot Henderson	NBA G League Ignite	Prospect
F	Jaden McDaniels	Minnesota Timberwolves	Sophomore
G	Davion Mitchell^{INJ2}	Sacramento Kings	Rookie
F	Jonathan Kuminga^{REP1}	Golden State Warriors	Rookie
G	Bones Hyland^{REP2}	Denver Nuggets	Rookie
Honorary coach: Gary Payton
Head coach: Chris Quinn (Miami Heat)

Team Worthy
Pos.	Player	Team	R/S/P
G	Cole Anthony	Orlando Magic	Sophomore
G/F	MarJon Beauchamp	NBA G League Ignite	Prospect
G	Josh Giddey	Oklahoma City Thunder	Rookie
G	Jalen Green	Houston Rockets	Rookie
C	Herbert Jones	New Orleans Pelicans	Rookie
G	Tyrese Maxey	Philadelphia 76ers	Sophomore
G	Jalen Suggs	Orlando Magic	Rookie
Honorary coach: James Worthy
Head coach: Malik Allen (Miami Heat)

^INJ1 Chris Duarte was unable to participate due to a toe injury.
^REP1 Jonathan Kuminga was selected as Chris Duarte's replacement.
^INJ2 Davion Mitchell was unable to participate due to a hand injury.
^REP2 Bones Hyland was selected as Davion Mitchell's replacement.

Semifinals
Team Isiah	50
Team Worthy	49
Team Barry	50
Team Payton	48

Final
Team Isiah	20
Team Barry	25

=== Skills Challenge ===
The Skills Challenge took place on February 19. Team Rooks advanced to the finals after winning the third round and receiving 200 points in the round. Team Cavs defeated Team Rooks in the finals after Evan Mobley drilled a half-court shot.

Team Rooks
Pos.	Player	Team
F	Scottie Barnes	Toronto Raptors
G	Cade Cunningham	Detroit Pistons
G	Josh Giddey	Oklahoma City Thunder

Team Cavs
Pos.	Player	Team
C	Jarrett Allen	Cleveland Cavaliers
G	Darius Garland	Cleveland Cavaliers
C/F	Evan Mobley	Cleveland Cavaliers

Team Antetokounmpos
Pos.	Player	Team
F	Giannis Antetokounmpo	Milwaukee Bucks
F	Alex Antetokounmpo	Raptors 905
F	Thanasis Antetokounmpo	Milwaukee Bucks

=== Three-Point Contest ===
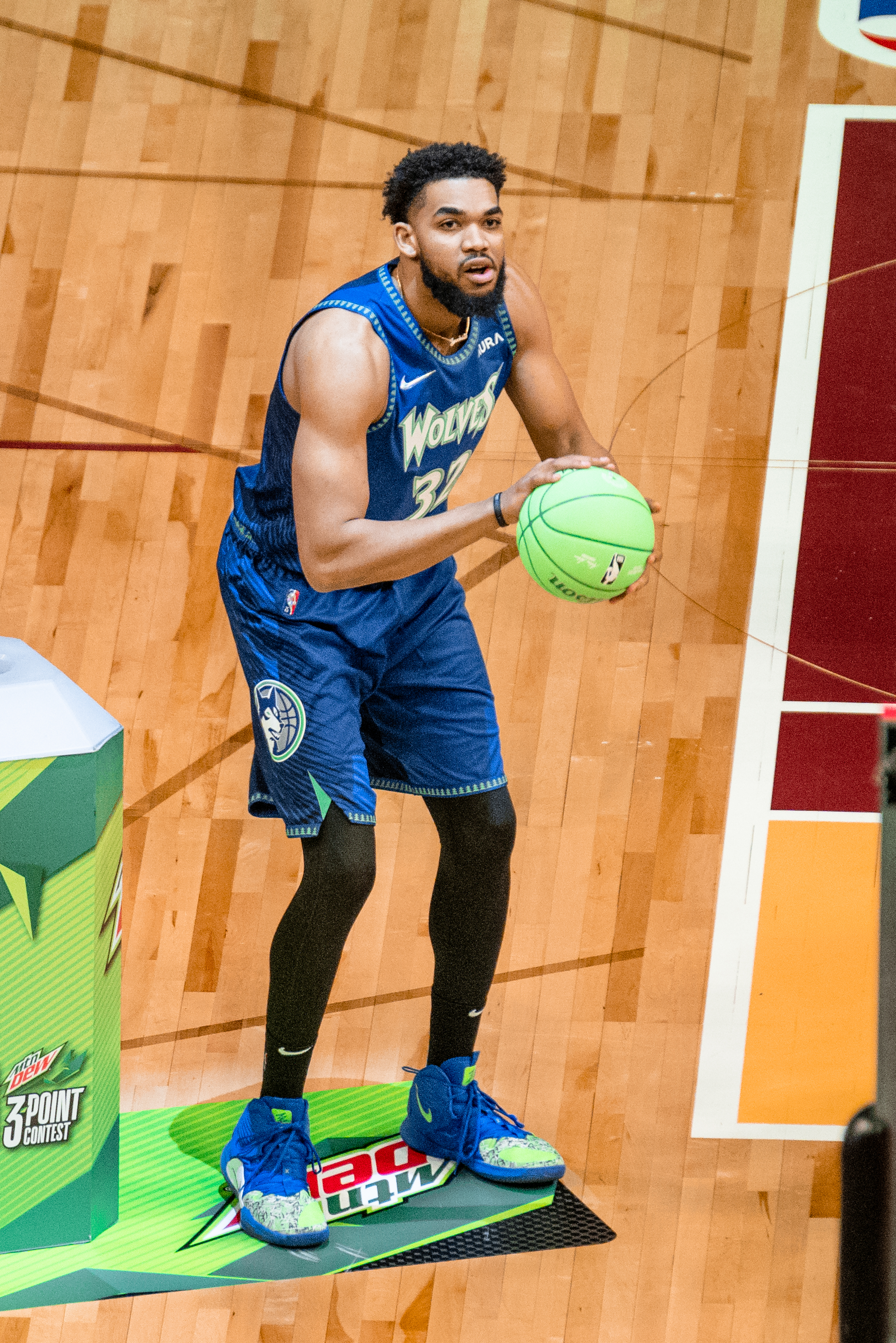
Winner Karl-Anthony Towns during the three-point contest

The Three-Point Contest took place on February 19. Towns won his first Three-Point Contest by defeating Trae Young and Luke Kennard. Towns set the record for most points in the final round with 29 surpassing Devin Booker who had 28 in 2018, becoming the first center to win the event and the first Timberwolves player since Kevin Love in 2012.

Contestants
Pos.	Player	Team	Height	Weight	First round	Final round
C/F	Karl-Anthony Towns	Minnesota Timberwolves	6–11	248	22	29
G	Trae Young	Atlanta Hawks	6–1	164	22	26
G	Luke Kennard	Los Angeles Clippers	6–5	206	28	26
G	Patty Mills	Brooklyn Nets	6–0	180	21	DNQ
G	CJ McCollum	New Orleans Pelicans	6–5	190	19	DNQ
G	Desmond Bane	Memphis Grizzlies	6–5	215	18	DNQ
G	Fred VanVleet	Toronto Raptors	6–1	195	16	DNQ
G	Zach LaVine	Chicago Bulls	6–5	200	14	DNQ

=== Slam Dunk Contest ===
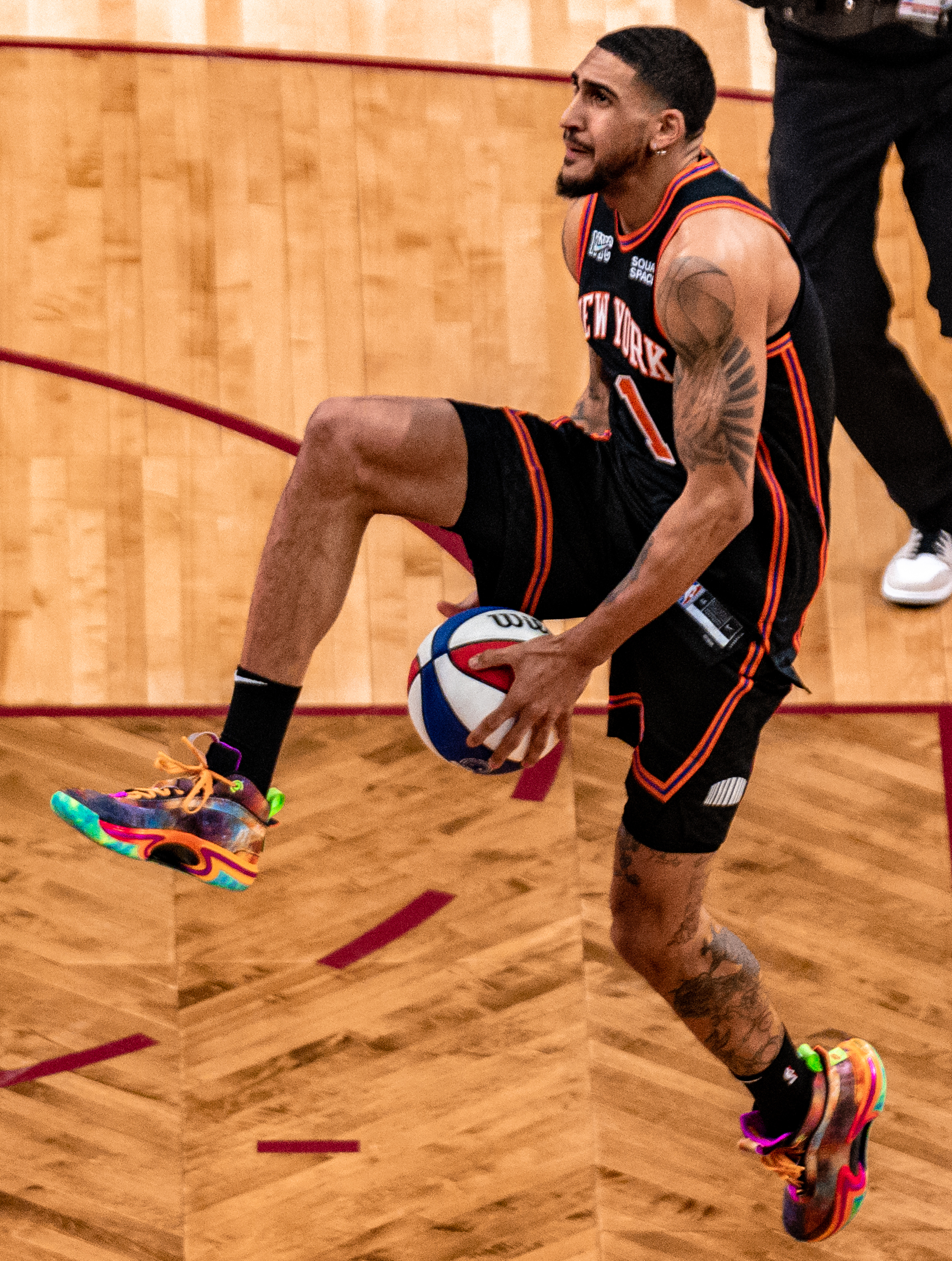
Obi Toppin during the dunk contest

The Slam Dunk Contest took place on February 19. Toppin won his first NBA Slam Dunk Contest by defeating Juan Toscano-Anderson in the finals. The contest was heavily criticized by analysts, players, and fans, with Dwyane Wade, who was calling the contest, describing it as "a solid six", which in the contest is the lowest score a dunk can receive.

Contestants
Pos.	Player	Team	Height	Weight	First round	Final round
F	Obi Toppin	New York Knicks	6–9	220	90 (44+46)	92 (45+47)
F	Juan Toscano-Anderson	Golden State Warriors	6–6	209	87 (44+43)	69 (39+30)
G	Jalen Green	Houston Rockets	6–4	186	83 (38+45)	DNQ
G	Cole Anthony	Orlando Magic	6–3	185	70 (40+30)	DNQ

=== Clorox Clutch Challenge ===
Tyrese Haliburton of the Indiana Pacers and Desmond Bane of the Memphis Grizzlies were the winners of the 2022 Clorox Clutch Challenge, an event for the 75th season at the 2022 NBA All-Star Weekend. The runner-up teams consisted of Chris Duarte and Scottie Barnes, Evan Mobley and Josh Giddey, as well as G-League players Michael Foster Jr. and Zeng Fanbo. Tyrese Maxey would end up replacing Duarte due to injury.

== Broadcasting ==
The game was televised nationally in the United States by TNT. This is the first All-Star Game since 2000 (then aired on NBC) to not be called by Marv Albert, as he retired at the end of the 2020–21 NBA season. (Albert, however, did call the 2000 All-Star Weekend as the event was aired on TNT and not NBC.) Sister network TBS carried an alternate feed, Inside the All-Star Game, which featured a conversational presentation of the game featuring the Inside the NBA panel of Charles Barkley, Ernie Johnson, Shaquille O'Neal, and Kenny Smith, with guests such as Draymond Green. Coaches, referees, and selected players also wore microphones. It was also the only time Kevin Harlan called the All-Star Game, with Brian Anderson taking over starting 2023.

In Canada, the game was televised nationally by Sportsnet.
