= 2021–22 NBA season =

76th NBA season

- NBA 75th anniversary diamond
- League: National Basketball Association
- Sport: Basketball
- Duration: October 19, 2021 – April 10, 2022; April 12–15, 2022 (Play-in tournament); April 16, 2022 – May 29, 2022 (Playoffs); June 2–16, 2022 (Finals)
- Games: 82
- Teams: 30
- TV partner(s): ABC, TNT, ESPN, NBA TV

Draft
- Top draft pick: Cade Cunningham
- Picked by: Detroit Pistons

Regular season
- Top seed: Phoenix Suns
- Season MVP: Nikola Jokić (Denver)
- Top scorer: Joel Embiid (Philadelphia)

Playoffs
- Eastern champions: Boston Celtics
- Eastern runners-up: Miami Heat
- Western champions: Golden State Warriors
- Western runners-up: Dallas Mavericks

Finals
- Champions: Golden State Warriors
- Runners-up: Boston Celtics
- Finals MVP: Stephen Curry (Golden State)

NBA seasons
- ← 2020–21 2022–23 →

The 2021–22 NBA season was the 76th season of the National Basketball Association (NBA). The regular season began on October 19, 2021, and ended on April 10, 2022. For the first time since the 2018–19 season, the NBA returned to its usual October to April regular season schedule after the previous two seasons were shortened due to the COVID-19 pandemic. The 2022 NBA All-Star Game was played at Rocket Mortgage FieldHouse in Cleveland on February 20, 2022. The play-in tournament was held on April 12–15, 2022. The 2022 NBA playoffs then began on April 16, and ended on June 16 with the Golden State Warriors defeating the Boston Celtics in the 2022 NBA Finals.

== 75th anniversary promotions ==
On July 7, 2021, the NBA announced that it would commemorate its 75th anniversary throughout the 2021–22 season. A 75th-anniversary diamond jubilee logo is featured in promotions across all NBA properties during the season, including on merchandise, digital and social media, and painted on the courts. It also announced its 75th anniversary team, honoring the greatest players in NBA history, as chosen by a panel of media, current and former players, coaches, general managers, and team executives. All NBA uniforms feature the Nike (Association, Icon, and City uniform) and Jordan Brand (Statement and Charlotte Hornets uniform) logos in a diamond embellishment, while the normal NBA logo on the back was modified to also feature diamond embellishments and the NBA mark replaced by the number 75.

The City edition for this season featured uniforms incorporating various design cues from different decades, with 27 of the 30 teams wearing these uniforms. The only teams not to participate were the New Orleans Pelicans, Phoenix Suns, and Utah Jazz. The Suns and Jazz wore last season's City uniforms, while the Pelicans wore a more standard City uniform as a tribute to the city of New Orleans. The Classic edition uniform for this season would be donned by the Boston Celtics, Golden State Warriors, and New York Knicks, the NBA's three surviving franchises from its first season. Both the Celtics and Knicks wore modern-day versions of the uniforms they wore from 1946, while the Warriors wore uniforms based on the designs they wore as the Philadelphia Warriors from 1946 to 1962. The classic Nike wordmark-and-swoosh logo appears on the Classic uniforms.

The NBA also unveiled a new set of awards to honor division and conference championship winners, and the MVPs of the conference finals. The division championships were named after Nat "Sweetwater" Clifton (Atlantic Division), Wayne Embry (Central Division), Earl Lloyd (Southeast Division), Willis Reed (Southwest Division), Sam Jones (Northwest Division), and Chuck Cooper (Pacific Division). The previously unnamed conference championship trophies were rebranded in honor of Bob Cousy (Eastern Conference) and Oscar Robertson (Western Conference), while the top performer of each conference finals will now receive awards named after Larry Bird (Eastern) and Magic Johnson (Western), respectively. In addition, the Larry O'Brien Championship Trophy was redesigned to feature the top circular disk engraving the first 75 NBA champions, and the bottom disk representing the next 25 champions.

Also, each team had an honorary celebrity captain to help celebrate the 75th anniversary.

The celebrity captains were:

- Usher - Atlanta Hawks
- Donnie Wahlberg - Boston Celtics
- Olivia Rodrigo - Brooklyn Nets
- Ric Flair - Charlotte Hornets
- Common - Chicago Bulls
- Drew Carey - Cleveland Cavaliers
- Pentatonix - Dallas Mavericks
- Joe Sakic - Denver Nuggets
- Kid Rock - Detroit Pistons
- Guy Fieri - Golden State Warriors
- Travis Scott - Houston Rockets
- David Letterman - Indiana Pacers
- Billy Crystal - Los Angeles Clippers
- Snoop Dogg - Los Angeles Lakers
- Jerry Lawler - Memphis Grizzlies
- DJ Khaled - Miami Heat
- Aaron Rodgers - Milwaukee Bucks
- Jesse Ventura - Minnesota Timberwolves
- Anthony Mackie - New Orleans Pelicans
- Michael Rapaport - New York Knicks
- Darci Lynne Farmer - Oklahoma City Thunder
- Bubba Watson - Orlando Magic
- Will Smith - Philadelphia 76ers
- Alice Cooper - Phoenix Suns
- K.D. Lang - Portland Trail Blazers
- Greta Gerwig - Sacramento Kings
- Shawn Michaels - San Antonio Spurs
- Anne Murray - Toronto Raptors
- Donny Osmond - Utah Jazz
- Wolf Blitzer - Washington Wizards

== Transactions ==
=== Retirement ===
- On July 6, 2021, Ian Mahinmi announced his retirement from the NBA. Mahinmi played 12 seasons in the NBA, winning one championship with the Dallas Mavericks in 2011.
- On July 18, 2021, Omri Casspi announced his retirement from professional basketball. Casspi played for seven teams during his 10-year NBA career.
- On July 21, 2021, Amile Jefferson announced his retirement from the NBA. Jefferson played two seasons with the Orlando Magic.
- On August 7, 2021, Jarrett Jack was hired as an assistant coach for the Phoenix Suns, ending his playing career. Jack played for nine teams during his 13-year NBA career.
- On August 11, 2021, J. R. Smith enrolled at North Carolina A&T State University with plans to join the Aggies golf team, effectively ending his career in the NBA. Smith played for five teams during his 16-year NBA career, winning an NBA championship in 2016 with the Cleveland Cavaliers and another one in 2020 with the Los Angeles Lakers.
- On August 12, 2021, Kyle Korver joined the Brooklyn Nets as a player development coach, effectively ending his playing career in the NBA. Korver played for six teams during his 17-year NBA career.
- On August 15, 2021, J. J. Barea joined the Dallas Mavericks as a player development coach, effectively ending his career in the NBA. Barea played for two teams during his 14-year NBA career, winning one championship with the Mavericks in 2011.
- On August 24, 2021, Jared Dudley announced his retirement from the NBA while accepting a role as an assistant coach for the Dallas Mavericks. Dudley played for seven teams during his 14-year NBA career, winning an NBA championship with the Los Angeles Lakers in 2020.
- On September 20, 2021, Luis Scola joined Pallacanestro Varese as chief executive officer, ending his playing career. Scola played for five teams during his 10-year NBA career.
- On September 21, 2021, JJ Redick announced his retirement from the NBA. Redick played for six teams during his 15-year NBA career.
- On September 28, 2021, it was announced that Tyson Chandler joined the Dallas Mavericks as a player development coach over the summer, effectively ending his playing career. Chandler played for eight teams during his 19-year NBA career, winning one championship with the Mavericks in 2011.
- On October 5, 2021, Pau Gasol announced his retirement from professional basketball. Gasol played for five teams during his 19-year NBA career, winning back-to-back NBA championships with the Los Angeles Lakers in 2009 and 2010.
- On October 16, 2021, the Beijing Royal Fighters announced Sun Yue's retirement from professional basketball. Sun won a championship with the Los Angeles Lakers in 2009, during his only season with the team.
- On October 20, 2021, Mike Hall announced his retirement from professional basketball. Hall played two games for the Washington Wizards in 2007.
- On October 22, 2021, Gerald Green announced his retirement from the NBA and joined the Houston Rockets coaching staff as a player development coach. Green played for eight teams during his 15-year playing career.
- On October 27, 2021, David Andersen announced his retirement from professional basketball. Andersen played for three teams during his two-year NBA career.
- On November 11, 2021, Damjan Rudež announced his retirement from professional basketball. Rudež played for three teams during his three-year NBA career.
- On November 26, 2021, Alexis Ajinça announced his retirement from professional basketball. Ajinça played for four NBA teams during his 13-year professional career.
- On November 27, 2021, Beno Udrih announced his retirement from professional basketball after being a development coach for the New Orleans Pelicans for the past two seasons. Udrih played for eight teams during his 13-year NBA career.
- On January 18, 2022, Chandler Parsons announced his retirement from professional basketball. Parsons played for four teams during his nine-year NBA career.
- On March 9, 2022, Jeff Teague joined the Atlanta Hawks as a scout, effectively ending his NBA career. Teague played for five teams during his 13-year NBA career.
- On March 21, 2022, Jamal Crawford announced his retirement from the NBA. Crawford played for nine teams during his 20-year NBA career.

=== Free agency ===
Free agency began on August 2, 2021; for the second consecutive year, the period for free agency was pushed back from its normal starting date in July due to COVID-19 pandemic. Notable signings included longtime Toronto Raptors guard Kyle Lowry announcing his decision to sign with the Miami Heat on a long-term deal. Lonzo Ball announced he would be signing a four-year, $85 million deal with the Chicago Bulls, joining fellow free agency signing DeMar DeRozan. The Los Angeles Clippers re-signed Kawhi Leonard, and the Phoenix Suns re-signed Chris Paul. In the east, the Brooklyn Nets extended Kevin Durant to a four-year $198 million deal.

=== Coaching changes ===
Coaching changes
Team	2020–21 season	2021–22 season
Off-season
Atlanta Hawks	Nate McMillan (interim)	Nate McMillan
Boston Celtics	Brad Stevens	Ime Udoka
Dallas Mavericks	Rick Carlisle	Jason Kidd
Indiana Pacers	Nate Bjorkgren	Rick Carlisle
New Orleans Pelicans	Stan Van Gundy	Willie Green
Orlando Magic	Steve Clifford	Jamahl Mosley
Portland Trail Blazers	Terry Stotts	Chauncey Billups
Washington Wizards	Scott Brooks	Wes Unseld Jr.
In-season
Sacramento Kings	Luke Walton	Alvin Gentry (interim)

==== Off-season ====
- On June 2, 2021, the Boston Celtics head coach Brad Stevens was promoted to president of basketball operations following the retirement of Danny Ainge.
- On June 4, 2021, the Portland Trail Blazers and Terry Stotts had mutually agreed to part ways after nine seasons with the team.
- On June 5, 2021, the Orlando Magic and Steve Clifford had mutually agreed to part ways after three seasons with the team.
- On June 9, 2021, the Indiana Pacers fired head coach Nate Bjorkgren after only one season with the team in which they missed the playoffs for the first time in six years.
- On June 16, 2021, the New Orleans Pelicans and head coach Stan Van Gundy had mutually agreed to part ways after only one season.
- On June 16, 2021, the Washington Wizards and head coach Scott Brooks part ways after five seasons with the team.
- On June 17, 2021, Rick Carlisle resigned from his position as head coach of the Dallas Mavericks after the 13 seasons with the team.
- On June 24, 2021, the Indiana Pacers rehired Rick Carlisle back as their new head coach for his second stint with the team.
- On June 27, 2021, the Portland Trail Blazers hired Chauncey Billups as their new head coach.
- On June 28, 2021, the Boston Celtics hired Ime Udoka as their new head coach.
- On June 28, 2021, the Dallas Mavericks hired Jason Kidd as their new head coach.
- On July 7, 2021, the Atlanta Hawks hired Nate McMillan as full-time head coach.
- On July 11, 2021, the Orlando Magic hired Jamahl Mosley as their new head coach.
- On July 17, 2021, the Washington Wizards hired Wes Unseld Jr. as their new head coach.
- On July 22, 2021, the New Orleans Pelicans hired Willie Green as their new head coach.

==== In-season ====
- On November 21, 2021, the Sacramento Kings fired head coach Luke Walton and named Alvin Gentry as their interim head coach.

== COVID-19 restrictions ==
As of October 2021, only the cities of Los Angeles, Toronto, New York City, and San Francisco have implemented requirements for spectators at sporting events to present proof of vaccination for COVID-19. While a majority of the league had seen its players get at least one dose of the vaccine, players in these named markets who choose not to be vaccinated would not be allowed to play home games. Moreover, the NBA has stated these players would be forced to forfeit money for the missed games. As of the announcement, the mandates were affecting the Brooklyn Nets, Golden State Warriors, Toronto Raptors, Los Angeles Clippers, Los Angeles Lakers, and New York Knicks. On January 3, 2022, an indoor vaccine mandate went into effect in Philadelphia, adding the Philadelphia 76ers to the aforementioned list. As of December 2021, 97% of NBA players are fully vaccinated against COVID-19. Furthermore, the NBA mandated that all guests ages 2+ seated within 15 feet of the court be fully vaccinated against COVID-19 or submit a negative COVID-19 test, as well as wear masks unless actively eating or drinking.

Below were the COVID-19 rules for each team:

Team	COVID-19 policies
Atlanta	Vaccination and masks were not required.
Boston	Masks were required for all guests ages 2+ until March 5, 2022. All guests ages 12+ were required to be fully vaccinated or provide a qualifying negative COVID-19 test. Beginning January 15, 2022, all guests ages 12+ were required to submit proof of at least one COVID-19 vaccination shot until February 15, where they had to submit full vaccination status. That rule was lifted on February 21, 2022.
Brooklyn	In accordance with NYC's vaccination mandate, all guests ages 12+ were required to submit proof of at least one COVID-19 vaccination shot until December 27, where they had to submit proof of two doses of a two-shot vaccine, or one dose of a single-shot vaccine. All guests ages 5 to 11 were also required to submit proof of at least one COVID-19 vaccination shot until January 29, 2022, where they had to submit proof of two doses of a two-shot vaccine, or one dose of a single-shot vaccine. Those rules were lifted on March 7, 2022. Masks were only required for unvaccinated guests until February 7, 2022.
Charlotte	Vaccination was not required. Masks were required for all guests ages 5+ until February 26, 2022.
Chicago	Masks were required for all guests ages 2+. Furthermore, all guests ages 12+ were required to be fully vaccinated or provide a negative COVID-19 test. Beginning January 3, 2022, all guests ages 5+ were required to submit proof of full vaccination status. Those rules were lifted on February 28, 2022.
Cleveland	Vaccination was not required. Masks were required for all guests ages 2+ from December 31, 2021, until February 1, 2022.
Dallas	Vaccination was not required. Masks were required for all guests ages 2+ until February 26, 2022.
Denver	Masks were required for all guests ages 2+. Beginning November 10, 2021, all guests ages 12+ were required to provide proof of full vaccination against COVID-19 or submit a negative COVID-19 test within 72 hours of tipoff. Those rules were lifted on March 12, 2022.
Detroit	Vaccination and masks were not required.
Golden State	Full vaccination was required for all guests ages 12+. Those not eligible for vaccination (ages 2–11) were required to submit a negative COVID-19 test within 72 hours of tipoff (48 hours for PCR or 24 hours for antigen beginning December 15). Effective December 6, guests ages 5–11 had the option to submit a negative COVID-19 test or show proof of full vaccination status. From February 1 to March 8, guests ages 12+ were required to show proof of full vaccination (including a booster, if eligible) or a negative COVID-19 test. Beginning March 8, the vaccination was reduced to complete initial series. On April 1, those rules were lifted. Masks were required for all guests ages 2+. That rule was lifted for the fully vaccinated on February 16, 2022, and for the unvaccinated in mid-May.
Houston	Vaccination and masks were not required.
Indiana	Vaccination and masks were not required.
L.A. Clippers	All guests ages 2+ were required to be fully vaccinated against COVID-19 or submit a negative COVID-19 test within 72 hours of tipoff (48 hours for PCR or 24 hours for antigen beginning December 15). Those rules were lifted on April 1, 2022. Masks were required for all guests ages 2+. That rule was lifted for the fully vaccinated on February 25, 2022, and for the unvaccinated on March 4.
L.A. Lakers	All guests ages 2+ were required to be fully vaccinated against COVID-19 or submit a negative COVID-19 test within 72 hours of tipoff (48 hours for PCR or 24 hours for antigen beginning December 15). Those rules were lifted on April 1, 2022. Masks were required for all guests ages 2+. That rule was lifted for the fully vaccinated on February 25, 2022, and for the unvaccinated on March 4.
Memphis	Full vaccination or negative COVID-19 test within 72 hours required to attend. Masks were required for all guests ages 2+. That rule for guests ages 12+ was lifted on October 28, 2021, and all other COVID-19 rules were lifted on November 19.
Miami	Vaccination was not required. Masks were required for all guests ages 2+ until February 26, 2022.
Milwaukee	Vaccination was not required. Masks were required for all guests ages 2+ from December 31, 2021, until March 2, 2022.
Minnesota	Vaccination or a negative COVID-19 test was required for all guests ages 5+ from January 26, 2022, until February 10. Masks were required for all guests ages 2+ from January 6, 2022, until February 24.
New Orleans	Proof of at least one vaccination shot or a negative COVID-19 test was required for all guests ages 12+. The rule also applied to guests ages 5+ on January 3, 2022, and full vaccination or a negative test was required, beginning February 1, 2022. Those rules were lifted on March 21, 2022. Masks were required for all guests ages 2+ until October 29, 2021, and from January 12, 2022, until March 3, 2022.
New York	In accordance with NYC's vaccination mandate, all guests ages 12+ were required to submit proof of at least one COVID-19 vaccination shot until December 27, where they had to submit proof of two doses of a two-shot vaccine, or one dose of a single-shot vaccine. All guests ages 5 to 11 were also required to submit proof of at least one COVID-19 vaccination shot until January 29, 2022, where they had to submit proof of two doses of a two-shot vaccine, or one dose of a single-shot vaccine. Those rules were lifted on March 7, 2022. Masks were only required for unvaccinated guests ages 2+ until March 7, 2022.
Orlando	Vaccination and masks were not required.
Philadelphia	Masks were required for all guests ages 2+ until March 2, 2022, and from April 18, 2022, until April 22, 2022. Effective January 3, 2022, all guests ages 12+ must be fully vaccinated against COVID-19. That same day, guests ages 5–11 were required to have least one vaccination shot until February 3, 2022, where they had to be fully vaccinated. Until January 17, they also had the option to provide a negative COVID-19 test.
Phoenix	Vaccination was not required. Masks were only required to enter the arena, but recommended for all other times. That rule was lifted in early March 2022.
Portland	Full vaccination or a negative COVID-19 test was required for all guests ages 12+. Masks were required for all guests ages 2+. Those rules were lifted on March 12, 2022.
Sacramento	All guests ages 2+ were required to be fully vaccinated against COVID-19 or submit a negative COVID-19 test within 72 hours of tipoff (48 hours for PCR or 24 hours for antigen beginning December 15). Those rules were lifted on April 1, 2022. Masks were required for all guests ages 2+. That rule was lifted for the fully vaccinated on February 16, 2022, and for the unvaccinated on March 10.
San Antonio	Vaccination and masks were not required.
Toronto	Full vaccination status was required for all guests ages 12+ until March 1, 2022. The arena was reduced to 50% capacity, effective December 18, 2021, and to no fans, beginning December 31. The arena returned to full capacity on March 1, 2022. Masks were required for all guests ages 2+ until March 21, 2022.
Utah	Full vaccination or negative COVID-19 test within 72 hours of tipoff required for all guests ages 12+ until February 25, 2022. Masks were required for guests ages 2+ from January 8, 2022, to January 21. Masks were only required for guests ages 2–11 until January 8, 2022, and from January 21, 2022, until February 25.
Washington	Masks were required for guests ages 2+ until November 23, 2021, and from December 20 to March 1, 2022. At least one dose of a COVID-19 vaccine was required for all guests ages 12+ from January 15, 2022, to February 15, when that rule was lifted.

== Preseason ==
The preseason began on October 3, 2021, and ended on October 15. On October 5, a game between the Milwaukee Bucks and Memphis Grizzlies was suspended before the fourth quarter due to a false fire alarm.

== Regular season ==
The regular season began on October 19, 2021, and ended on April 10, 2022.

Eastern Conference

Atlantic Division	W	L	PCT	GB	Home	Road	Div	GP
y – Boston Celtics	51	31	.622	–	28‍–‍13	23‍–‍18	9–7	82
x – Philadelphia 76ers	51	31	.622	–	24‍–‍17	27‍–‍14	6–10	82
x – Toronto Raptors	48	34	.585	3.0	24‍–‍17	24‍–‍17	10–6	82
x − Brooklyn Nets	44	38	.537	7.0	20‍–‍21	24‍–‍17	10–6	82
New York Knicks	37	45	.451	14.0	17‍–‍24	20‍–‍21	5–11	82

Central Division	W	L	PCT	GB	Home	Road	Div	GP
y – Milwaukee Bucks	51	31	.622	–	27‍–‍14	24‍–‍17	12–4	82
x – Chicago Bulls	46	36	.561	5.0	27‍–‍14	19‍–‍22	10–6	82
pi − Cleveland Cavaliers	44	38	.537	7.0	25‍–‍16	19‍–‍22	10–6	82
Indiana Pacers	25	57	.305	26.0	16‍–‍25	9‍–‍32	2–14	82
Detroit Pistons	23	59	.280	28.0	13‍–‍28	10‍–‍31	6–10	82

Southeast Division	W	L	PCT	GB	Home	Road	Div	GP
c – Miami Heat	53	29	.646	–	29‍–‍12	24‍–‍17	13–3	82
x − Atlanta Hawks	43	39	.524	10.0	27‍–‍14	16‍–‍25	9–7	82
pi − Charlotte Hornets	43	39	.524	10.0	22‍–‍19	21‍–‍20	8–8	82
Washington Wizards	35	47	.427	18.0	21‍–‍20	14‍–‍27	7–9	82
Orlando Magic	22	60	.268	31.0	12‍–‍29	10‍–‍31	3–13	82

Western Conference

Northwest Division	W	L	PCT	GB	Home	Road	Div	GP
y – Utah Jazz	49	33	.598	–	29‍–‍12	20‍–‍21	15–1	82
x – Denver Nuggets	48	34	.585	1.0	23‍–‍18	25‍–‍16	6–10	82
x – Minnesota Timberwolves	46	36	.561	3.0	26‍–‍15	20‍–‍21	12–4	82
Portland Trail Blazers	27	55	.329	22.0	17‍–‍24	10‍–‍31	1–15	82
Oklahoma City Thunder	24	58	.293	25.0	12‍–‍29	12‍–‍29	6–10	82

Pacific Division	W	L	PCT	GB	Home	Road	Div	GP
z – Phoenix Suns	64	18	.780	–	32‍–‍9	32‍–‍9	10–6	82
x – Golden State Warriors	53	29	.646	11.0	31‍–‍10	22‍–‍19	12–4	82
pi – Los Angeles Clippers	42	40	.512	22.0	25‍–‍16	17‍–‍24	9–7	82
Los Angeles Lakers	33	49	.402	31.0	21‍–‍20	12‍–‍29	3–13	82
Sacramento Kings	30	52	.366	34.0	16‍–‍25	14‍–‍27	6–10	82

Southwest Division	W	L	PCT	GB	Home	Road	Div	GP
y – Memphis Grizzlies	56	26	.683	–	30‍–‍11	26‍–‍15	11–5	82
x – Dallas Mavericks	52	30	.634	4.0	29‍–‍12	23‍–‍18	14–2	82
x – New Orleans Pelicans	36	46	.439	20.0	19‍–‍22	17‍–‍24	6–10	82
pi − San Antonio Spurs	34	48	.415	22.0	16‍–‍25	18‍–‍23	6–10	82
Houston Rockets	20	62	.244	36.0	11‍–‍30	9‍–‍32	3–13	82

=== By conference ===
Eastern Conference
#	Team	W	L	PCT	GB	GP
1	c – Miami Heat *	53	29	.646	–	82
2	y – Boston Celtics *	51	31	.622	2.0	82
3	y – Milwaukee Bucks *	51	31	.622	2.0	82
4	x – Philadelphia 76ers	51	31	.622	2.0	82
5	x – Toronto Raptors	48	34	.585	5.0	82
6	x – Chicago Bulls	46	36	.561	7.0	82
7	x − Brooklyn Nets	44	38	.537	9.0	82
8	pi − Cleveland Cavaliers	44	38	.537	9.0	82
9	x − Atlanta Hawks	43	39	.524	10.0	82
10	pi − Charlotte Hornets	43	39	.524	10.0	82
11	New York Knicks	37	45	.451	16.0	82
12	Washington Wizards	35	47	.427	18.0	82
13	Indiana Pacers	25	57	.305	28.0	82
14	Detroit Pistons	23	59	.280	30.0	82
15	Orlando Magic	22	60	.268	31.0	82

Western Conference
#	Team	W	L	PCT	GB	GP
1	z – Phoenix Suns *	64	18	.780	–	82
2	y – Memphis Grizzlies *	56	26	.683	8.0	82
3	x – Golden State Warriors	53	29	.646	11.0	82
4	x – Dallas Mavericks	52	30	.634	12.0	82
5	y – Utah Jazz *	49	33	.598	15.0	82
6	x – Denver Nuggets	48	34	.585	16.0	82
7	x – Minnesota Timberwolves	46	36	.561	18.0	82
8	pi – Los Angeles Clippers	42	40	.512	22.0	82
9	x – New Orleans Pelicans	36	46	.439	28.0	82
10	pi − San Antonio Spurs	34	48	.415	30.0	82
11	Los Angeles Lakers	33	49	.402	31.0	82
12	Sacramento Kings	30	52	.366	34.0	82
13	Portland Trail Blazers	27	55	.329	37.0	82
14	Oklahoma City Thunder	24	58	.293	40.0	82
15	Houston Rockets	20	62	.244	44.0	82

Notes

- z – Clinched home court advantage for the entire playoffs
- c – Clinched home court advantage for the conference playoffs
- y – Clinched division title
- x – Clinched playoff spot
- pi – Clinched play-in tournament spot
- * – Division leader

=== Postponed games due to COVID-19 ===
- Two Chicago Bulls games (one home game against the Detroit Pistons on December 14 and one road game against the Toronto Raptors on December 16) were postponed after ten Bulls players and additional staff members were placed in the NBA's COVID-19 protocols.
- Two Brooklyn Nets home games (against the Denver Nuggets on December 19 and against the Washington Wizards on December 21) were postponed after ten Nets players were placed in the NBA's COVID-19 protocols.
- The December 19 game between the Cleveland Cavaliers and the Atlanta Hawks was postponed due to five Cavaliers players testing positive for COVID-19.
- The December 19 game between the New Orleans Pelicans and the Philadelphia 76ers was postponed due to the Sixers not having the required minimum eight players available.
- The December 20 game between the Orlando Magic and the Toronto Raptors was postponed due to a COVID outbreak within the Magic organization.
- The December 22 game between the Toronto Raptors and the Chicago Bulls was postponed due to the Raptors not having the required minimum eight players available.
- The December 23 game between the Brooklyn Nets and the Portland Trail Blazers was postponed due to the Nets not having the required minimum eight players available.
- The December 29 game between the Miami Heat and the San Antonio Spurs was postponed due to the Heat not having the required minimum eight players available.
- The December 30 game between the Golden State Warriors and the Denver Nuggets was postponed due to a COVID outbreak within the Nuggets organization.

== Play-in tournament ==
Only the top six seeds in each conference after regular season advanced to the main rounds of the 2022 NBA playoffs, while the teams ranked 7th through 10th in each conference participated in a Page playoff system tournament from April 12–15, 2022, to determine 7th and 8th seeded teams in each conference making playoffs. To this end in each conference: 1) The 7th-place team hosted the 8th-place team in the double-chance round needing to win one game to advance, with the winner clinching the 7th seed in the playoffs. 2) The 9th-place team hosted the 10th-place team in the elimination round that requires two wins to advance, with the loser being eliminated from playoff contention. 3) The loser in the double-chance round hosted the elimination-round game winner, with the winner clinching the 8th seed and the loser being eliminated.

=== Eastern Conference ===
Play-in games
7	Brooklyn	115
8	Cleveland	108
9	Atlanta	132
10	Charlotte	103

No. 8 seed game
8	Cleveland	101
9	Atlanta	107

Final seeds
7	Brooklyn	No. 7 seed
9	Atlanta	No. 8 seed

Bold Game winner
Italic Team with home-court advantage

=== Western Conference ===
Play-in games
7	Minnesota	109
8	LA Clippers	104
9	New Orleans	113
10	San Antonio	103

No. 8 seed game
8	LA Clippers	101
9	New Orleans	105

Final seeds
7	Minnesota	No. 7 seed
9	New Orleans	No. 8 seed

Bold Game winner
Italic Team with home-court advantage

== Playoffs ==
The playoffs began on April 16, 2022. The Finals began on June 2 and concluded on June 16.

=== Bracket ===
First round	Conference semifinals
E1	Miami*	4
E8	Atlanta	1
E1	Miami*	4
E4	Philadelphia	2
E4	Philadelphia	4
E5	Toronto	2
Eastern Conference
E3	Milwaukee*	4
E6	Chicago	1
E3	Milwaukee*	3
E2	Boston*	4
E2	Boston*	4
E7	Brooklyn	0
W1	Phoenix*	4
W8	New Orleans	2
W1	Phoenix*	3
W4	Dallas	4
W4	Dallas	4
W5	Utah*	2
Western Conference
W3	Golden State	4
W6	Denver	1
W3	Golden State	4
W2	Memphis*	2
W2	Memphis*	4
W7	Minnesota	2

Conference finals
E1	Miami*	3
E2	Boston*	4
W4	Dallas	1
W3	Golden State	4

NBA Finals
E2	Boston*	2
W3	Golden State	4

- * Division winner
- Bold Series winner
- Italic Team with home-court advantage

== Statistics ==
Sourced to "2021–22 NBA Traditional Stats". NBA.com.

=== Individual statistic leaders ===
Category	Player	Team(s)	Statistic
Points per game	Joel Embiid	Philadelphia 76ers	30.6
Rebounds per game	Rudy Gobert	Utah Jazz	14.7
Assists per game	Chris Paul	Phoenix Suns	10.8
Steals per game	Dejounte Murray	San Antonio Spurs	2.0
Blocks per game	Jaren Jackson Jr.	Memphis Grizzlies	2.3
Turnovers per game	Luka Dončić	Dallas Mavericks	4.5
Fouls per game	Jae'Sean Tate	Houston Rockets	3.7
Minutes per game	Pascal Siakam	Toronto Raptors	37.9
FG%	Rudy Gobert	Utah Jazz	71.3%
FT%	Jordan Poole	Golden State Warriors	92.5%
3FG%	Luke Kennard	Los Angeles Clippers	44.9%
Efficiency per game	Nikola Jokić	Denver Nuggets	32.8
Double-doubles	Nikola Jokić	Denver Nuggets	66
Triple-doubles	Nikola Jokić	Denver Nuggets	19

=== Individual game highs ===
Category	Player	Team	Statistic
Points	Karl-Anthony Towns	Minnesota Timberwolves	60
Points	Kyrie Irving	Brooklyn Nets	60
Rebounds	Domantas Sabonis	Indiana Pacers	25
Rebounds	Andre Drummond	Philadelphia 76ers	25
Assists	Darius Garland	Cleveland Cavaliers	19
Assists	Chris Paul	Phoenix Suns	19
Steals	Paul George	Los Angeles Clippers	8
Blocks	Daniel Gafford	Washington Wizards	8
Blocks	Mitchell Robinson	New York Knicks	8
Three pointers	Bojan Bogdanović	Utah Jazz	11
Three pointers	Malik Beasley	Minnesota Timberwolves	11
Three pointers	Robert Covington	Los Angeles Clippers	11

=== Team statistic leaders ===
Category	Team	Statistic
Points per game	Minnesota Timberwolves	115.9
Rebounds per game	Memphis Grizzlies	49.2
Assists per game	Charlotte Hornets	28.1
Steals per game	Memphis Grizzlies	9.8
Blocks per game	Memphis Grizzlies	6.5
Turnovers per game	Houston Rockets	16.5
Fouls per game	Detroit Pistons	21.9
FG%	Phoenix Suns	48.5%
FT%	Philadelphia 76ers	82.1%
3P%	Miami Heat	37.9%
+/−	Phoenix Suns	+7.8

== Awards ==
=== Yearly awards ===
2021–22 NBA awards
Award	Recipient(s)	Finalists
Most Valuable Player	Nikola Jokić (Denver Nuggets)	Giannis Antetokounmpo (Milwaukee Bucks); Joel Embiid (Philadelphia 76ers)
Defensive Player of the Year	Marcus Smart (Boston Celtics)	Mikal Bridges (Phoenix Suns); Rudy Gobert (Utah Jazz)
Rookie of the Year	Scottie Barnes (Toronto Raptors)	Cade Cunningham (Detroit Pistons); Evan Mobley (Cleveland Cavaliers)
Sixth Man of the Year	Tyler Herro (Miami Heat)	Cameron Johnson (Phoenix Suns); Kevin Love (Cleveland Cavaliers)
Most Improved Player	Ja Morant (Memphis Grizzlies)	Darius Garland (Cleveland Cavaliers); Dejounte Murray (San Antonio Spurs)
Coach of the Year	Monty Williams (Phoenix Suns)	Taylor Jenkins (Memphis Grizzlies); Erik Spoelstra (Miami Heat)
Executive of the Year	Zachary Kleiman (Memphis Grizzlies)	Koby Altman (Cleveland Cavaliers); Artūras Karnišovas (Chicago Bulls)
NBA Sportsmanship Award	Patty Mills (Brooklyn Nets)	Bam Adebayo (Miami Heat); Mikal Bridges (Phoenix Suns); Darius Garland (Cleveland Cavaliers); Jeff Green (Denver Nuggets); Jaren Jackson Jr. (Memphis Grizzlies)
Twyman–Stokes Teammate of the Year Award	Jrue Holiday (Milwaukee Bucks)	DeMar DeRozan (Chicago Bulls); Boban Marjanović (Dallas Mavericks)
Community Assist Award	Gary Payton II (Golden State Warriors)	Bismack Biyombo (Phoenix Suns); Robert Covington (Los Angeles Clippers); Luka Dončić (Dallas Mavericks); Tobias Harris (Philadelphia 76ers); Jaren Jackson Jr. (Memphis Grizzlies); Brook Lopez (Milwaukee Bucks); Ricky Rubio (Indiana Pacers); Karl-Anthony Towns (Minnesota Timberwolves); Trae Young (Atlanta Hawks)
Kareem Abdul-Jabbar Social Justice Champion Award	Reggie Bullock (Dallas Mavericks)	Jrue Holiday (Milwaukee Bucks); Jaren Jackson Jr. (Memphis Grizzlies); Karl-Anthony Towns (Minnesota Timberwolves); Fred VanVleet (Toronto Raptors)

- All-NBA First Team:
  - F Giannis Antetokounmpo, Milwaukee Bucks
  - F Jayson Tatum, Boston Celtics
  - C Nikola Jokić, Denver Nuggets
  - G Luka Dončić, Dallas Mavericks
  - G Devin Booker, Phoenix Suns
- All-NBA Second Team:
  - F DeMar DeRozan, Chicago Bulls
  - F Kevin Durant, Brooklyn Nets
  - C Joel Embiid, Philadelphia 76ers
  - G Stephen Curry, Golden State Warriors
  - G Ja Morant, Memphis Grizzlies
- All-NBA Third Team:
  - F LeBron James, Los Angeles Lakers
  - F Pascal Siakam, Toronto Raptors
  - C Karl-Anthony Towns, Minnesota Timberwolves
  - G Chris Paul, Phoenix Suns
  - G Trae Young, Atlanta Hawks

- NBA All-Defensive First Team:
  - F Giannis Antetokounmpo, Milwaukee Bucks
  - F Jaren Jackson Jr., Memphis Grizzlies
  - C Rudy Gobert, Utah Jazz
  - G Marcus Smart, Boston Celtics
  - G Mikal Bridges, Phoenix Suns
- NBA All-Defensive Second Team:
  - F Bam Adebayo, Miami Heat
  - F Draymond Green, Golden State Warriors
  - C Robert Williams III, Boston Celtics
  - G Jrue Holiday, Milwaukee Bucks
  - G Matisse Thybulle, Philadelphia 76ers

- NBA All-Rookie First Team:
  - Scottie Barnes, Toronto Raptors
  - Cade Cunningham, Detroit Pistons
  - Evan Mobley, Cleveland Cavaliers
  - Franz Wagner, Orlando Magic
  - Jalen Green, Houston Rockets
- NBA All-Rookie Second Team:
  - Herbert Jones, New Orleans Pelicans
  - Josh Giddey, Oklahoma City Thunder
  - Bones Hyland, Denver Nuggets
  - Ayo Dosunmu, Chicago Bulls
  - Chris Duarte, Indiana Pacers

=== Players of the Week ===
The following players were named the Eastern and Western Conference Players of the Week.

Week	Eastern Conference	Western Conference	Ref
October 19–24	Miles Bridges (Charlotte Hornets) (1/1)	Stephen Curry (Golden State Warriors) (1/2)	
October 25–31	Jimmy Butler (Miami Heat) (1/1)	Rudy Gobert (Utah Jazz) (1/1)	
November 1–7	Jarrett Allen (Cleveland Cavaliers) (1/1)	Paul George (Los Angeles Clippers) (1/1)	
November 8–14	Kevin Durant (Brooklyn Nets) (1/2)	Stephen Curry (Golden State Warriors) (2/2)	
November 15–21	Giannis Antetokounmpo (Milwaukee Bucks) (1/1)	Damian Lillard (Portland Trail Blazers) (1/1)	
November 22–28	Trae Young (Atlanta Hawks) (1/3)	Devin Booker (Phoenix Suns) (1/3)	
November 29 – December 5	DeMar DeRozan (Chicago Bulls) (1/3)	Donovan Mitchell (Utah Jazz) (1/1)	
December 6–12	Domantas Sabonis (Indiana Pacers) (1/1)	LeBron James (Los Angeles Lakers) (1/1)	
December 13–19	Jayson Tatum (Boston Celtics) (1/4)	Karl-Anthony Towns (Minnesota Timberwolves) (1/3)	
December 20–26	Kemba Walker (New York Knicks) (1/1)	Shai Gilgeous-Alexander (Oklahoma City Thunder) (1/1)	
December 27 – January 2	DeMar DeRozan (Chicago Bulls) (2/3)	Ja Morant (Memphis Grizzlies) (1/2)	
January 3–9	Fred VanVleet (Toronto Raptors) (1/1)	Ja Morant (Memphis Grizzlies) (2/2)	
January 10–16	Darius Garland (Cleveland Cavaliers) (1/1)	Devin Booker (Phoenix Suns) (2/3)	
January 17–23	Trae Young (Atlanta Hawks) (2/3)	Nikola Jokić (Denver Nuggets) (1/2)	
January 24–30	Joel Embiid (Philadelphia 76ers) (1/2)	Chris Paul (Phoenix Suns) (1/1)	
January 31 – February 6	Pascal Siakam (Toronto Raptors) (1/1)	Brandon Ingram (New Orleans Pelicans) (1/1)	
February 7–13	DeMar DeRozan (Chicago Bulls) (3/3)	Luka Dončić (Dallas Mavericks) (1/3)	
February 28 – March 6	Jayson Tatum (Boston Celtics) (2/4)	Karl-Anthony Towns (Minnesota Timberwolves) (2/3)	
March 7–13	Kevin Durant (Brooklyn Nets) (2/2)	Luka Dončić (Dallas Mavericks) (2/3)	
March 14–20	Jayson Tatum (Boston Celtics) (3/4)	Karl-Anthony Towns (Minnesota Timberwolves) (3/3)	
March 21–27	Jayson Tatum (Boston Celtics) (4/4)	Devin Booker (Phoenix Suns) (3/3)	
March 28 – April 3	Trae Young (Atlanta Hawks) (3/3)	Nikola Jokić (Denver Nuggets) (2/2)	
April 4–10	Joel Embiid (Philadelphia 76ers) (2/2)	Luka Dončić (Dallas Mavericks) (3/3)	

=== Players of the Month ===
The following players were named the Eastern and Western Conference Players of the Month.

Month	Eastern Conference	Western Conference	Ref
October/November	Kevin Durant (Brooklyn Nets) (1/1)	Stephen Curry (Golden State Warriors) (1/1)	
December	Joel Embiid (Philadelphia 76ers) (1/2)	Donovan Mitchell (Utah Jazz) (1/1)	
January	Joel Embiid (Philadelphia 76ers) (2/2)	Nikola Jokić (Denver Nuggets) (1/2)	
February	DeMar DeRozan (Chicago Bulls) (1/1)	Luka Dončić (Dallas Mavericks) (1/1)	
March/April	Giannis Antetokounmpo (Milwaukee Bucks) (1/1)	Nikola Jokić (Denver Nuggets) (2/2)	

=== Rookies of the Month ===
The following players were named the Eastern and Western Conference Rookies of the Month.

Month	Eastern Conference	Western Conference	Ref
October/November	Evan Mobley (Cleveland Cavaliers) (1/1)	Josh Giddey (Oklahoma City Thunder) (1/4)	
December	Franz Wagner (Orlando Magic) (1/1)	Josh Giddey (Oklahoma City Thunder) (2/4)	
January	Cade Cunningham (Detroit Pistons) (1/1)	Josh Giddey (Oklahoma City Thunder) (3/4)	
February	Scottie Barnes (Toronto Raptors) (1/2)	Josh Giddey (Oklahoma City Thunder) (4/4)	
March/April	Scottie Barnes (Toronto Raptors) (2/2)	Jalen Green (Houston Rockets) (1/1)	

=== Coaches of the Month ===
The following coaches were named the Eastern and Western Conference Coaches of the Month.

Month	Eastern Conference	Western Conference	Ref
October/November	Billy Donovan (Chicago Bulls) (1/1)	Monty Williams (Phoenix Suns) (1/2)	
December	Erik Spoelstra (Miami Heat) (1/1)	Taylor Jenkins (Memphis Grizzlies) (1/1)	
January	J. B. Bickerstaff (Cleveland Cavaliers) (1/1)	Monty Williams (Phoenix Suns) (2/2)	
February	Ime Udoka (Boston Celtics) (1/2)	Quin Snyder (Utah Jazz) (1/1)	
March/April	Ime Udoka (Boston Celtics) (2/2)	Jason Kidd (Dallas Mavericks) (1/1)	

== Arenas ==
- The Indiana Pacers' home arena, formerly known as Bankers Life Fieldhouse, was renamed Gainbridge Fieldhouse on September 27, 2021.
- The Los Angeles Clippers and Los Angeles Lakers' home arena, formerly known as Staples Center, was renamed Crypto.com Arena, beginning December 25, 2021. It was announced in November of that same year.
- The Miami Heat's home arena, formerly known as American Airlines Arena, was renamed FTX Arena on June 4, 2021.
- The Oklahoma City Thunder's home arena, formerly known as Chesapeake Energy Arena, was renamed Paycom Center on July 27, 2021.
- The Phoenix Suns' home arena, formerly known as Phoenix Suns Arena, was renamed Footprint Center on July 16, 2021.
- The Toronto Raptors returned to Scotiabank Arena in Toronto at the start of the season. The Raptors were forced to play their 2020–21 home games at the Amalie Arena in Tampa, Florida, due to the long-term closure of the Canada–United States border as COVID-19 vaccines were not widely available.

== Media ==
This was the sixth year of a nine-year deal with ABC, ESPN, TNT, and NBA TV. Beginning with this season, TNT moved its marquee Thursday doubleheaders to Tuesday nights starting with the season opener. The network continued to air Thursday night doubleheaders, but only during opening week and beginning in January to avoid competing with Thursday Night Football. TNT aired a doubleheader on Martin Luther King Jr. Day (January 17) and the final day of the regular season (April 10).

ABC began its NBA Saturday Primetime early with a special game airing on December 11.

On February 9, 2022, the Warriors–Jazz matchup televised on ESPN was the first in the network's history to have an all women production team. Beth Mowins was the play-by-play commentator, with Doris Burke as analyst and Lisa Salters on the sideline; in addition, 33 other women handled production roles in Salt Lake City and in the ESPN headquarters in Bristol, Connecticut.

The Portland Trail Blazers signed a broadcasting deal with Root Sports Northwest, replacing NBC Sports Northwest as the team's game broadcasters.

In Game 7 of the Eastern Conference Finals, ESPN's lead play-by-play Mike Breen was out due to COVID-19 protocols, which resulted to Mark Jones replacing Breen on play-by-play. In Game 1 of the 2022 NBA Finals, analyst Jeff Van Gundy was also out for the same reason, leaving Jones, Mark Jackson, and sideline reporter Lisa Salters; they were together the first all-African-American broadcast team for an NBA Finals game. Van Gundy returned in Game 2, while Breen followed suit in Game 3.

== Notable occurrences ==
- On May 13, 2020, Wilson once again became the manufacturer and supplier of official NBA game balls, replacing Spalding. Wilson's initial partnership with the league began in 1946 under the NBA's predecessor BAA until it ended after 37 seasons in 1983, when Spalding took over.
- On August 6, 2021, Duncan Robinson re-signed with the Heat on a five-year, $90 million contract, the largest ever for an undrafted player.
- On August 10, 2021, Luka Dončić signed a five-year, $207 million rookie contract extension with the Mavericks, the largest in league history.
- On October 20, 2021, Buddy Hield passed Peja Stojaković to become the all-time three-point scoring leader in Kings franchise history.
- On October 22, 2021, James Harden passed Kyle Korver for fourth place on the NBA all-time three-point scoring list.
- On October 22, 2021, Chris Paul became the first player to reach 20,000 career points and 10,000 career assists.
- On October 23, 2021, Tyler Herro became the first player in Heat franchise history to record at least 30 points and 10 rebounds in one game off the bench.
- On October 24, 2021, Carmelo Anthony passed Moses Malone for ninth place on the NBA all-time scoring list.
- On October 25, 2021, Ja Morant became the first player in Grizzlies franchise history to record at least 40 points and 10 assists in one game.
- On October 27, 2021, Joe Harris passed Jason Kidd to become the all-time leader in three-pointers made in Nets franchise history.
- On November 2, 2021, Chris Paul passed Steve Nash for third place on the NBA all-time assist list.
- On November 6, 2021, Doc Rivers became the 10th coach in NBA history to reach 1,000 wins.
- On November 24, 2021, Kevin Durant passed Allen Iverson for 25th place on the NBA all-time scoring list.
- On December 2, 2021, the Grizzlies defeated the Thunder by 73 points, 152–79, which is the largest margin of victory in NBA history.
- On December 4, 2021, Duncan Robinson became the fastest player to hit 600 three-pointers, in his 184th game, passing the prior record made by Donovan Mitchell in 240 games.
- On December 9, 2021, LeBron James became the fifth player in NBA history to reach 100 career triple-doubles.
- On December 14, 2021, Stephen Curry surpassed Ray Allen to become the NBA all-time leader in made three-pointers.
- On December 16, 2021, Devonte Graham set the record for the longest game-winning buzzer-beater at 61 feet
- On December 17, 2021, Stephen Curry became the fastest player in NBA history to make 150 three-pointers in a season, accomplishing the feat in 28 games.
- On December 27, 2021, Stephen Curry became the first player in NBA history to surpass 3,000 made career three-pointers.
- On December 27, 2021, Greg Monroe became the 541st player to play in the NBA this season, establishing an NBA record.
- On December 27, 2021, Josh Giddey became the second player in NBA history to record a double-double while going scoreless (Norm Van Lier).
- On December 28, 2021, LeBron James became the third player in NBA history to surpass 36,000 career points, and the youngest player to do so.
- On December 31, 2021, LeBron James became the second player in NBA history to record 40 points and zero turnovers in a game at age 35 or older (Michael Jordan). James is also the first player to record at least 40 points, 10 rebounds, and five three-pointers in 30 minutes or less.
- On January 1, 2022, Stephen Curry broke his own NBA record of consecutive games making at least one three-pointer, officially reaching 158 games and surpassing his previous mark of 157 games, which ended on November 5, 2016.
- On January 1, 2022, DeMar DeRozan became the first player in NBA history with a game-winning buzzer beater on consecutive days.
- On January 2, 2022, Josh Giddey became the youngest player in NBA history to record a triple-double at 19 years and 84 days, surpassing the record set by LaMelo Ball last season. Giddey also became the youngest player in NBA history to lead all players in points, rebounds, and assists in one game, becoming the second teenager to do so along with Luka Dončić.
- On January 3, 2022, LeBron James met the minimum criteria for points per game by playing at least 70 percent of his team's games, averaging 28.6 points, and became the oldest player to average 25-plus points per game, having already been the youngest to do so, as he averaged 27.6 points per game in his sophomore season at 20 years old. He also surpassed Oscar Robertson for 4th all-time for free throws made.
- On January 4, 2022, Russell Westbrook had his first game without turnovers since March 14, 2016; this snapped the longest streak of consecutive games with a turnover since they have been first recorded for the 1977–78 NBA season at 407 games.
- On January 7, 2022, LeBron James became the oldest player in NBA history to record at least 25 points in ten straight games, doing so at 37 years old. He also passed Alvin Robertson for 10th all-time in career steals.
- On January 7, 2022, Trae Young had his 17th consecutive 25-point game, breaking a tie with Dominique Wilkins for the Hawks franchise record.
- On January 9, 2022, Klay Thompson played his first game after missing nearly 31 months, or 941 days, since June 13, 2019, the decisive Game 6 of the 2019 NBA Finals.
- On January 9, 2022, LeBron James passed Oscar Robertson for 7th all-time in career assists.
- On January 15, 2022, James Harden set an NBA record for most three-point field goals missed with 4,457, overtaking the previous record set by Ray Allen.
- On January 20, 2022, Joel Embiid tied his career high with 50 points, plus 12 rebounds and three blocks, while making 17-of-23 field goals and 15-of-17 free throws, in just 27 minutes. It is the second-quickest time needed to score at least 50 points in the shot clock era after Klay Thompson's 52-point game in 26 minutes on October 29, 2018. Embiid also joined Hall of Famers Allen Iverson and Wilt Chamberlain as the only players in 76ers franchise history with multiple 50-point games, while recording a double-double with least 50 points and 10 rebounds in the fewest minutes of any NBA player since 1955.
- On January 20, 2022, LeBron James became the fifth player in NBA history to record at least 30,000 career points and 10,000 career rebounds. James is also the first player to record at least 30,000 career points, 10,000 career rebounds, and 9,000 career assists.
- On January 20, 2022, Chris Paul had his 13th career game of recording at least 20 points, ten assists, and no turnovers. He overtook Tim Hardaway's count for most games since individual turnovers were first tracked in the 1977–78 season.
- On January 21, 2022, Dwight Howard broke a tie with Nate Thurmond to claim sole possession of 10th all-time in rebounds.
- On January 23, 2022, Jimmy Butler passed LeBron James for first place on the Miami Heat all-time triple-doubles list.
- On January 25, 2022, Nikola Jokić became the first player in NBA history to record at least 5,000 rebounds and 3,000 assists within their first 500 career games.
- On January 26, 2022, Kelly Oubre became the fourth player in NBA history to record at least ten three-pointers coming off the bench (J. R. Smith, Danilo Gallinari, and Donyell Marshall), as the Hornets recorded a franchise record of 158 points and LaMelo Ball had a plus–minus of 45.
- On January 29, 2022, Russell Westbrook scored 30 of his 35 points in the second half, the most by any Laker since Kobe Bryant's last game on April 13, 2016.
- On January 29, 2022, the Toronto Raptors became the first team to have five players play at least 50 minutes in a game since the shot clock era.
- On February 1, 2022, Josh Giddey became the fourth teenager in NBA history to have record 500 points, 200 rebounds, and 200 assists in his first 45 career games (LeBron James, Luka Dončić, and LaMelo Ball).
- On February 1, 2022, Gary Trent Jr. became the first player in NBA history to have five straight 30-point games after having fewer than five such games in his career (minimum 100 games) entering this streak.
- On February 4, 2022, Gregg Popovich became the first coach in NBA history to win 1,500 games, including the regular season and playoffs.
- On February 5, 2022, Luka Dončić moved into the top 10 for all-time triple-doubles with 44, surpassing Fat Lever.
- On February 8, 2022, Giannis Antetokounmpo, Joel Embiid, and LeBron James reached 20 straight games recording at least 25 points; it is the first season in NBA history that three players have achieved this feat.
- On February 12, 2022, LeBron James passed Kareem Abdul-Jabbar for most combined points in regular season and playoffs.
- On February 12, 2022, DeMar DeRozan tied Michael Jordan's franchise record with the Bulls of five straight games with at least 35 points. On November 22, 2021, DeRozan had already broke a franchise record for most point scored in their first 16 games at 425, just one point ahead Jordan's rookie 1984–85 NBA season.
- On February 12, 2022, Gregg Popovich won his 1,332nd regular season game as head coach, tying Lenny Wilkens for second place all-time.
- On February 12, 2022, Nikola Jokić became the fifth player in NBA history to have multiple seasons recording 15 or more triple-doubles.
- On February 15, 2022, the Celtics became the first team in NBA history to win three straight road games by a margin of at least 30 points in each game. In addition, their win over the Philadelphia 76ers marked the first time in the three-point era (1979–80) that a team made more three-pointers in a game than their opponent had total field goals.
- On February 15, 2022, Josh Giddey became the youngest player in NBA history to both record a triple-double in consecutive games and record a 20-point triple-double.
- On February 16, 2022, DeMar DeRozan recorded his seventh straight 35-point game while shooting 50 percent from the field, breaking a tie with Wilt Chamberlain, and recording the longest such streak.
- On February 16, 2022, Lou Williams passed Dell Curry to become the all-time leader in games played off the bench with 985 (starters were first tracked in 1970–71).
- On February 17, 2022, Duncan Robinson became the fastest player in NBA history to record 700 three-pointers. He made this feat in a span of 216 games, after making six three-pointers in a double-overtime win against the Hornets, surpassing Buddy Hield's previous record in 269 games.
- On February 20, 2022, Stephen Curry set the record for most three-pointers made in an All-Star quarter (6), half (8), and game (16).
- On February 24, 2022, DeMar DeRozan became the seventh player in NBA history with eight straight 35-point games (Wilt Chamberlain, Elgin Baylor, Michael Jordan, Kobe Bryant, LeBron James, and James Harden), at the same time extending his streak of consecutive 35-point games with at least 50 percent shooting to eight, which ended in his next game on February 27. His streak of ten consecutive 30-point games ended on March 1, just one game behind franchise record held by Michael Jordan.
- On March 4, 2022, James Harden, Joel Embiid, and Tyrese Maxey scored at least 20 points in each of their first three games together. Over this four-game undefeated span, Maxey averaged 26.8 points per game, shot 64.9 percent from the field, and shot 70 percent from three-point range on five attempts per game.
- On March 4, 2022, the Pelicans, at that time at least ten games under .500, became the first team in NBA history to outscore their opponents by 100 points across their first four games after the All-Star Break.
- On March 4, 2022, DeMarcus Cousins had his first 30-point game since January 22, 2018. His 31 points in 24 minutes were the fewest minutes in a 30-point game in Nuggets franchise history and the third-fewest minutes played in a 30-point game in his career, as well as his third career 30-point game in 35 minutes or fewer, equalling Freeman Williams for the most such games in the shot clock era.
- On March 5, 2022, LeBron James recorded a season-high 56-point game, which was also his Lakers career high. He became the fourth NBA player to record a 50-point game at the age of 37 (Michael Jordan, Kobe Bryant, and Jamal Crawford); it was the second-most points scored by a player in NBA history after turning 35 years old, behind Bryant's 60-point farewell game. He also became the oldest player to record 55 points and 10 rebounds in a game, and was the first Lakers to do so since Shaquille O'Neal in 2000, as well as the first player in NBA history to have a 50-point game before turning 21 and after turning 35. James also became the second player after Jordan to record a 50-point game in three different decades, and passed Karl Malone to move into second for all-time minutes played, trailing only Kareem Abdul-Jabbar.
- On March 6, 2022, Bojan Bogdanović became the first player in NBA history to make at least eleven three-pointers in a game while not making a two-point field goal.
- On March 6, 2022, Kevin Durant became the 23rd player in NBA history to record 25,000 career points.
- On March 11, 2022, Gregg Popovich won his 1,336th regular season game as head coach, surpassing Don Nelson for first place all-time.
- On March 11, 2022, LeBron James became the oldest player to have multiple 50-point games in a season, and is the first Lakers player since Kobe Bryant in April 2007 to have back-to-back 50-point home games.
- On March 13, 2022, LeBron James became the seventh player in NBA history to record 10,000 assists, and he also became first player with 30,000 points, 10,000 assists, and 10,000 rebounds.
- On March 14, 2022, there were three different 45-plus-point games (Karl-Anthony Towns with 60, Stephen Curry with 47, and Trae Young with 46) in one day for the first time in NBA history. Towns' was a career high, and he broke his own record for the Timberwolves franchise record. He also became the sixth player in NBA history to secure a 60-point, 15-rebound game.
- On March 15, 2022, Kyrie Irving scored a career-high 60 points and passed Deron Williams for Nets franchise record. Irving and Kevin Durant became the first teammates to score 50-plus points in consecutive games.
- On March 19, 2022, LeBron James passed Karl Malone for second place as the NBA all-time scoring leader.
- On March 26, 2022, a game between the Indiana Pacers and Toronto Raptors at Scotiabank Arena was suspended in the second quarter after a speaker caught fire. The fire prompted fans to be evacuated from the building and the game was suspended for 70 minutes. At 9:30 p.m, the game resumed, but fans were not allowed in the arena. The Raptors won 131–91.
- On March 31, 2022, Giannis Antetokounmpo passed Kareem Abdul-Jabbar to become the all-time scoring leader in Bucks franchise history.
- On April 7, 2022, Nikola Jokić became the first player in NBA history to tally at least 2,000 points, 1,000 rebounds, and 500 assists in a season. He finished the season on historical good statistical values on advanced metrics, with the highest single-season player efficiency rating in NBA history at 33.01, and also led the NBA in win shares, offensive win shares, plus–minus, value over replacement player, total rebounds, double-doubles (66), and triple-doubles (19).
- On April 10, 2022, Joel Embiid won a historically close three-player fight with Giannis Antetokounmpo (29.9) and LeBron James (30.3), for the NBA scoring title, with 30.6 points per game. It was Embiid's first scoring title, the first foreign player to do so, as well as the first center to do so since Shaquille O'Neal in 2000, the fourth center to do so since the ABA–NBA merger in 1976, the first center to average at least 30 points since fellow 76ers Moses Malone in 1982, and the first 76er to led the league since Allen Iverson in 2005. Aged 37, James would have broken Michael Jordan's record of oldest scoring leader at 34, but he only played 56 games, two fewer than the necessary to qualify, due to injuries. Embiid became the only player other than Michael Jordan to average 40.4 points or more per 100 possessions.
- Tyus Jones averaged the highest assist-to-turnover ratio (min. 50 games played), at 7.04, in a season in NBA history
- DeMar DeRozan had the highest Win Probability Added in a season (since tracking began 1996–97) at 11.08
- Trae Young became the second player to lead the league in both points and assists in the same season; Nate Archibald was the first to achieve this feat during the 1972–73 season with the Kansas City-Omaha Kings.
- Due to the COVID-19 pandemic allowing teams to acquire players on hardship exceptions, this season produced a record-high 225 10-day contracts signed throughout the NBA.

== See also ==
- List of NBA regular season records
