= Darius Garland =

American basketball player (born 2000)

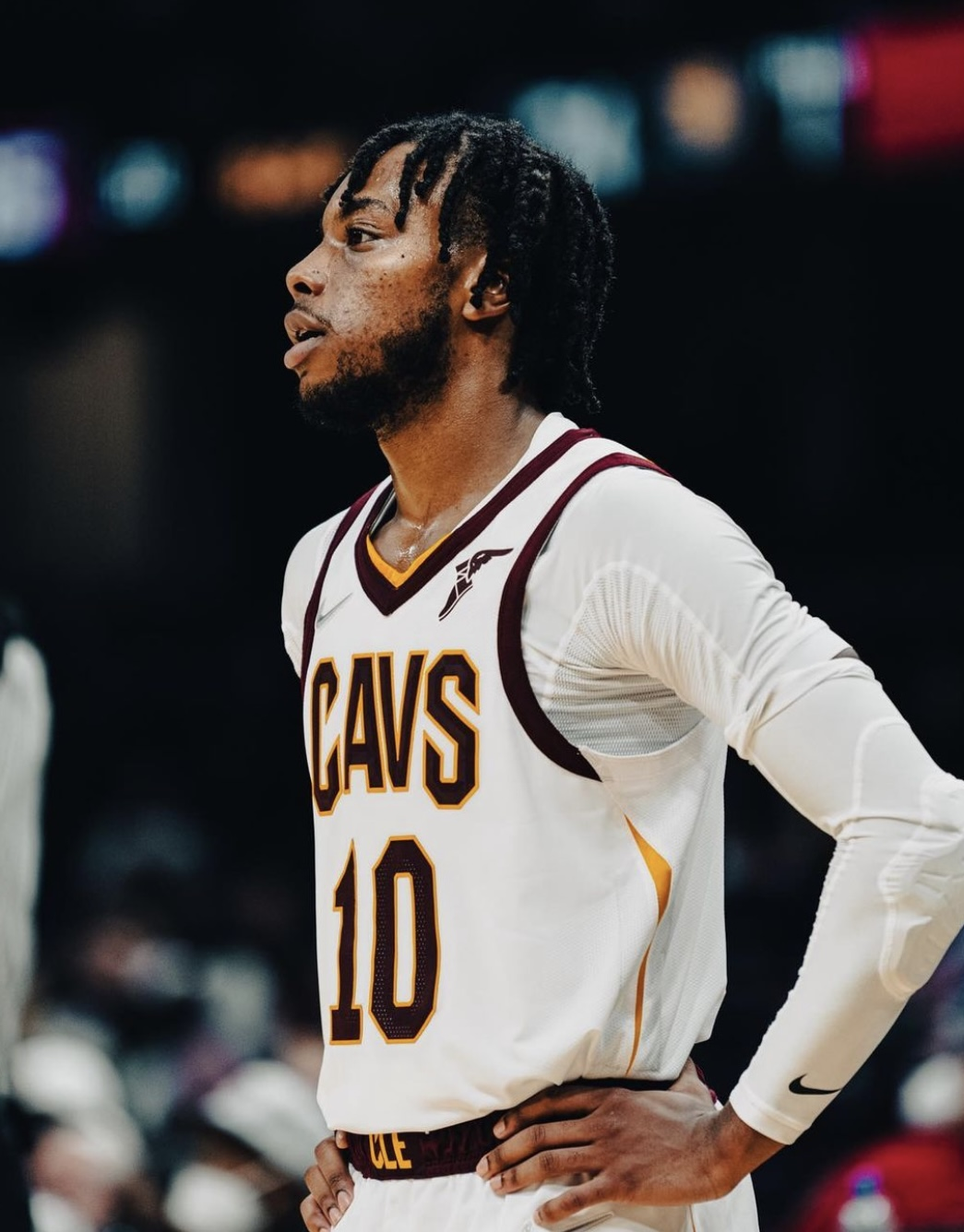
- Garland with the Cleveland Cavaliers in 2022

No. 10 – Los Angeles Clippers
- Position: Point guard
- League: NBA

Personal information
- Born: January 26, 2000 (age 26) Gary, Indiana, U.S.
- Listed height: 6 ft 1 in (1.85 m)
- Listed weight: 192 lb (87 kg)

Career information
- High school: Brentwood Academy (Brentwood, Tennessee)
- College: Vanderbilt (2018–2019)
- NBA draft: 2019: 1st round, 5th overall pick
- Drafted by: Cleveland Cavaliers
- Playing career: 2019–present

Career history
- 2019–2026: Cleveland Cavaliers
- 2026–present: Los Angeles Clippers

Career highlights
- 2× NBA All-Star (2022, 2025); McDonald's All-American (2018); 3× Tennessee Mr. Basketball (2016–2018)
- Stats at NBA.com
- Stats at Basketball Reference

Darius Kinnard Garland (born January 26, 2000) is an American professional basketball player for the Los Angeles Clippers of the National Basketball Association (NBA). He played college basketball for the Vanderbilt Commodores. Born in Gary, Indiana, Garland is the son of former professional basketball player Winston Garland. Garland attended Brentwood Academy in high school, joining the varsity basketball team in eighth grade and leaving as a four-time state champion and three-time Tennessee Mr. Basketball winner. He was a five-star recruit, ranked among the best point guards in the 2018 class, and a McDonald's All-American. He is a two-time NBA All-Star.

Garland committed to Vanderbilt Commodores men's basketball. After five games, his college career was cut short by a meniscus injury, which prompted him to leave the team to prepare for the NBA draft. After criticism in his first season due to perceived disappointing play, Garland was named to his first NBA All-Star Game in 2022, and finished third in voting for the NBA's Most Improved Player award the same year. He was named an All-Star again in 2025.

== Early life ==
Garland was born in Gary, Indiana, to Felicia Garland and former NBA player Winston Garland. He grew up playing baseball and started basketball at age five but soon narrowed down his focus to only the latter sport. Garland continued with basketball in elementary school and scored his first basket in second grade. In third grade, he attended basketball camps in Valparaiso, Indiana led by Bryce Drew, who would become his college coach at Vanderbilt. Garland played on a travel team against older opponents and joined an Amateur Athletic Union (AAU) squad based in Nashville, Tennessee when he was in fourth grade, because none of the local teams met his standards. After he completed sixth grade, his family moved to Tennessee so that he could attend Brentwood Academy in Brentwood, Tennessee with his AAU teammates Gavin Schoenwald and Camron Johnson. Garland's father described, "We had always talked about relocating. My mother had lived in Tennessee and she liked it. I just talked to the family and everybody was on board. It was a big leap of faith."

== High school career ==
Garland joined the starting lineup for the Brentwood Academy varsity basketball team while in eighth grade. In his freshman season, he averaged 17 points, 1.3 rebounds, and 2.7 assists per game, leading his team to a Tennessee Secondary School Athletic Association (TSSAA) Division II-AA state championship. Garland was one of three finalists for Tennessee Mr. Basketball among Division II-AA players. On December 23, 2015, as a sophomore, he claimed most valuable player (MVP) honors at the King of the Bluegrass Holiday Classic, after scoring 23 points versus Fairdale High School in the title game. Garland averaged 18.6 points and 4.3 assists per game and earned TSSAA Division II-AA Mr. Basketball accolades. High school sports website MaxPreps also included him in its Sophomore All-American Team honorable mention. From his sophomore to junior year, he grew 2½ inches, and by his fourth season with Brentwood Academy, he was ranked the best point guard in the 2018 class by recruiting service 247Sports.

In March 2017, Garland garnered Naismith Trophy High School All-America honorable mention recognition. He averaged 23.4 points, 3.9 rebounds and 2.1 steals per game and led his team to a 30–2 record and state championship. Garland additionally earned MaxPreps Junior All-American first team distinction. On November 13, 2017, he committed to play college basketball for Vanderbilt, drawn there by its proximity to his home and head coach Bryce Drew. Entering his senior season, Garland appeared in the USA Today All-USA preseason team. He averaged 27.6 points, 5.0 rebounds, 4.3 assists and 1.7 steals and secured a fourth straight state title for Brentwood Academy, tying the TSSAA record. Garland joined the MaxPreps High School All-American third team and became the only player other than Brandan Wright to win Tennessee Mr. Basketball on three occasions. In March 2018, he was named Gatorade Tennessee Player of the Year and a semifinalist for the Naismith Trophy. On March 28, Garland recorded a game-high 11 assists at the 2018 McDonald's All-American Game. He took part in the Jordan Brand Classic and Nike Hoop Summit as well.

College recruiting
Name	Hometown	School	Height	Weight	Commit date
Darius Garland; PG	Brentwood, TN	Brentwood Academy (TN)	6 ft 1 in (1.85 m)	175 lb (79 kg)	Nov 13, 2017
Darius Garland; PG	Recruit ratings: Rivals: 247Sports: ESPN: (93)				
Overall recruit ranking: Rivals: 17 247Sports: 11 ESPN: 16
Note: In many cases, Scout, Rivals, 247Sports, On3, and ESPN may conflict in their listings of height and weight.; In these cases, the average was taken. ESPN grades are on a 100-point scale.; Sources: "Vanderbilt 2018 Basketball Commitments". Rivals.; "2018 Vanderbilt Commodores Recruiting Class". ESPN.; "2018 Team Ranking". Rivals.

== College career ==
Garland was the only freshman in the Southeastern Conference (SEC) to make the preseason all-conference team. On November 6, 2018, in his first college game against Winthrop, Garland led all scorers with 24 points. In a 79–70 win over Liberty on November 19, he scored a season-high 33 points, the second-most points by a freshman in school history. Garland injured his knee during a layup versus Kent State on November 23 and left the game early. Four days later, Vanderbilt head coach Bryce Drew revealed that Garland would be sidelined for the remainder of the season with a meniscus injury. On January 22, 2019, he announced that he would leave Vanderbilt to recover from his injury and prepare for the 2019 NBA draft. Garland later became one of 77 total invitees to take part in the NBA Draft Combine. However, he left the event early on May 15, with the notion that he got promised a selection by a team in the NBA draft lottery.

== Professional career ==
=== Cleveland Cavaliers (2019–2026) ===
==== Early years (2019–2021) ====
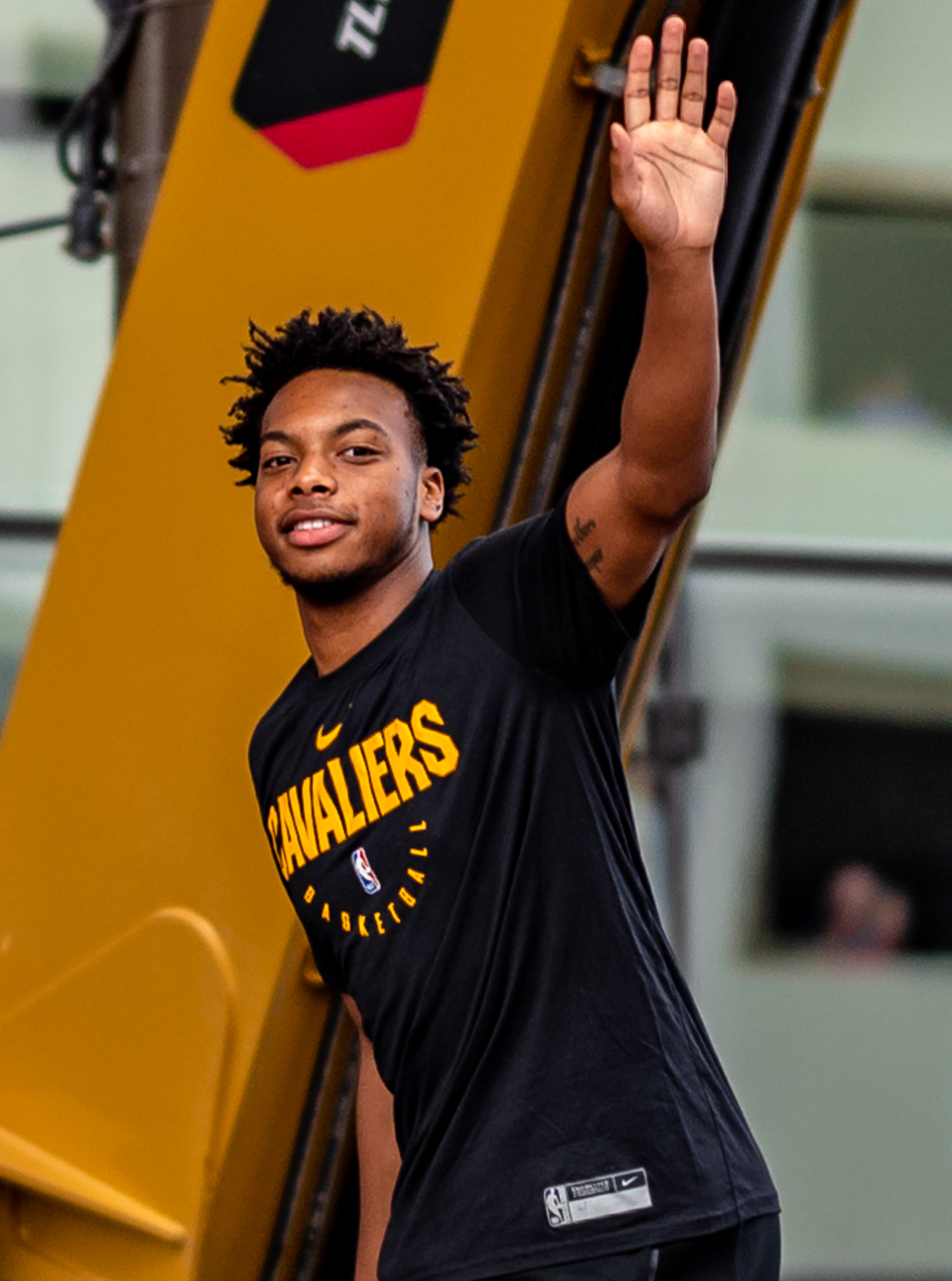
Garland at the opening of Rocket Mortgage FieldHouse in 2019

Garland was selected with the fifth pick by the Cleveland Cavaliers in the 2019 NBA draft. On July 3, 2019, he signed his rookie scale contract with the Cavaliers. On October 23, 2019, Garland made his debut in the NBA, starting in an 85–94 loss to the Orlando Magic with eight points, two rebounds, five assists and a steal. Garland made history during this game by becoming the first player born in the 2000s to make his NBA debut. On November 22, he scored a season-high 23 points, alongside four assists, in a 101–143 loss to the Dallas Mavericks. During his rookie season, Garland was often ranked amongst the NBA's worst players. He finished his rookie season averaging 12.3 points and 3.9 assists per game. Garland was excluded from both of the season-end NBA All-Rookie teams.

On December 23, 2020, Garland made his season debut for the Cavaliers, recording 22 points, six rebounds and six assists in a 121–114 win over the Charlotte Hornets. On April 5, 2021, he scored a then career-high 37 points, along with seven assists in a 125–101 win over the San Antonio Spurs. Despite the Cavaliers missing the playoffs for a third straight season, Garland averaged 17.4 points per game, alongside 6.1 assists and 1.2 steals.

==== First All-Star and playoff appearance (2021–2024) ====
On January 12, 2022, Garland recorded his first career triple-double, putting up 11 points, 10 rebounds, and a then career-high 15 assists, in a 111–91 win over the Utah Jazz. On January 15, Garland recorded 27 points and a career-high 18 assists in a 107–102 win over the Oklahoma City Thunder. On February 3, he was selected to his first NBA All-Star Game as a reserve. On March 8, Garland scored a then career-high 41 points with 13 assists in a 127–124 win against the Indiana Pacers. On April 12, Garland scored a team-leading 34 points in a 115–108 NBA play-in tournament loss to the Brooklyn Nets. The following game, Garland and the Cavaliers lost to the Atlanta Hawks, meaning that despite doubling their previous season's win total from 22 to 44 and finishing with the eighth best record in the eastern conference, they would not advance to the postseason. Garland later finished third, behind Ja Morant and Dejounte Murray, in voting for the Most Improved Player award.

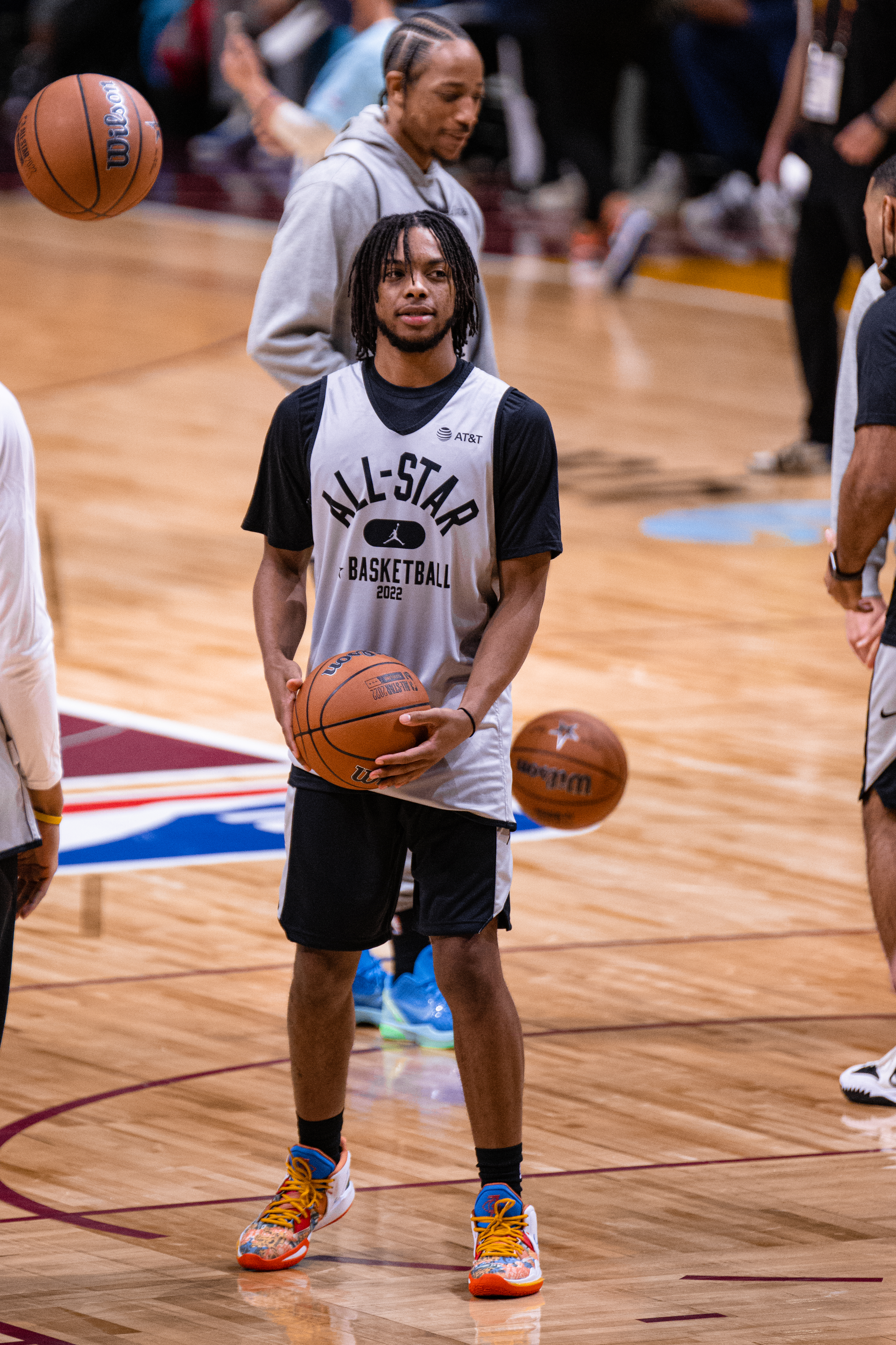
Garland at the 2022 NBA All-Star Game

On July 9, 2022, Garland signed a five-year, $231M designated rookie extension with the Cavaliers. On November 13, he scored a career-high 51 points, with 27 points scored in the fourth quarter, including a personal record 10-of-15 three-point shots in a 129–124 loss to the Minnesota Timberwolves. He became the fourth Cavaliers player to score 50, joining LeBron James (nine times), Kyrie Irving (twice) and Walt Wesley (once). His ten 3-pointers doubled his previous single-game high and were one short of Irving's team record. He also became the youngest player to score 50+ points and hit 10+ threes in a game before turning 25. On November 18, Garland led the Cavaliers to a double-overtime 132–122 win against the Charlotte Hornets with a game-leading 41 points. Garland helped the Cavaliers earn the No. 4 seed in the Eastern Conference, securing home-court advantage in the first round and achieving their first 50-win season since 1993 without LeBron James on the roster.

==== Second All-Star selection and best Eastern Conference record (2024–2026) ====
On January 30, 2025, Garland was named as reserve for the 2025 NBA All-Star Game, his second selection. On February 5, 2025, Garland recorded 25 points, five assists and hit a 31-foot 3-pointer at the buzzer to give the Cavaliers a 118–115 win over the Detroit Pistons. Garland helped lead the Cavaliers to the best record in the Eastern Conference at 64–18, the second-best regular season record in franchise history.

In the playoffs, Garland struggled with injuries, and the Cavaliers were upset by the Indiana Pacers in five games in the Eastern Conference Semifinals for the second year in a row, ending their postseason run earlier than expected. On June 9, Garland underwent surgery on the injured left big toe that had hampered him during Cleveland's playoff exit. Garland is expected to spend 4-to-5 months going through a progression of treatment and rehabilitation before resuming basketball activities by the start of training camp.

Garland made 26 starts for the Cavaliers during the 2025–26 NBA season, recording averages of 18.0 points, 2.4 rebounds, and 6.9 assists.

=== Los Angeles Clippers (2026–present) ===
On February 4, 2026, Garland, along with a second-round pick, was traded to the Los Angeles Clippers in exchange for James Harden. On March 2, Garland made his Clippers debut, putting up 12 points, two assists, two rebounds, and one steal in a 114–101 win over the Golden State Warriors. On March 22, Garland recorded 41 points, 11 assists, and eight three-pointers, leading the Clippers to a 138–131 overtime win over the Dallas Mavericks. He became the first player in Clippers franchise history to record at least 40 points, 10 assists, and seven three-pointers in a single game.

== Career statistics ==
Legend
GP	Games played	GS	Games started	MPG	Minutes per game
FG%	Field goal percentage	3P%	3-point field goal percentage	FT%	Free throw percentage
RPG	Rebounds per game	APG	Assists per game	SPG	Steals per game
BPG	Blocks per game	PPG	Points per game	**Bold**	Career high

=== NBA ===
==== Regular season ====
Year	Team	GP	GS	MPG	FG%	3P%	FT%	RPG	APG	SPG	BPG	PPG
2019–20	Cleveland	59	59	30.9	.401	.355	.875	1.9	3.9	.7	.1	12.3
2020–21	Cleveland	54	50	33.1	.451	.395	.848	**3.4**	6.1	1.2	.1	17.4
2021–22	Cleveland	68	68	**35.7**	.462	.383	**.892**	3.3	**8.6**	**1.3**	.1	**21.7**
2022–23	Cleveland	69	69	35.5	.462	.410	.863	2.7	7.8	1.2	.1	21.6
2023–24	Cleveland	57	57	33.3	.446	.371	.834	2.7	6.5	**1.3**	.1	18.0
2024–25	Cleveland	**75**	**75**	30.7	**.472**	.401	.878	2.9	6.7	1.2	.1	20.6
2025–26	Cleveland	26	26	30.5	.451	.360	.861	2.4	6.9	.8	.1	18.0
2025–26	L.A. Clippers	19	17	29.1	.471	**.438**	.860	2.3	6.4	1.2	**.3**	19.9
Career		427	421	32.9	.454	.389	.866	2.6	6.7	1.1	.1	18.9
All-Star		2	0	15.1	.438	.500	—	.5	3.0	2.0	.0	9.5

==== Playoffs ====
Year	Team	GP	GS	MPG	FG%	3P%	FT%	RPG	APG	SPG	BPG	PPG
2023	Cleveland	5	5	**37.7**	**.438**	**.387**	.840	1.8	5.0	**1.6**	**.2**	**20.6**
2024	Cleveland	**12**	**12**	36.0	.427	.352	.810	**3.6**	**5.8**	1.1	**.2**	15.7
2025	Cleveland	5	5	29.6	.420	.286	**.917**	2.2	5.2	.4	.0	18.0
Career		22	22	35.0	.428	.343	.857	2.9	5.5	1.0	.1	17.3

=== College ===
Year	Team	GP	GS	MPG	FG%	3P%	FT%	RPG	APG	SPG	BPG	PPG
2018–19	Vanderbilt	5	5	27.8	.537	.478	.880	3.8	2.6	1.8	.6	16.2

== Personal life ==
Garland's father Winston Garland played college basketball for Missouri State before spending seven seasons in the National Basketball Association (NBA). He later became a recreational leader at the Indiana State Prison and coach for West Side Leadership Academy in Gary. Both of Garland's grandfathers served in the United States Army. He has an older sister and four older brothers.
