= 2020–21 Bucknell Bison men's basketball team =

American college basketball season

2020–21 Bucknell Bison men's basketball
- Conference: Patriot League
- Central Division
- Record: 5–7 (4–6 Patriot)
- Head coach: Nathan Davis (6th season)
- Associate head coach: Paul Harrison
- Assistant coaches: Joe Meehan; Johnathan Brown
- Home arena: Sojka Pavilion

2020–21 Patriot League men's basketball standings
	Conf.				Overall
Team	W		L	PCT	W		L	PCT
North
Colgate †	11	–	1	.917	14	–	2	.875
Army	7	–	7	.500	12	–	10	.545
Boston University	6	–	10	.375	7	–	11	.389
Holy Cross	5	–	11	.313	5	–	11	.313
Central
Lafayette	9	–	5	.643	9	–	6	.600
Bucknell	4	–	6	.400	5	–	7	.417
Lehigh	4	–	10	.286	4	–	11	.267
South
Navy	12	–	1	.923	15	–	3	.833
American	4	–	5	.444	4	–	6	.400
Loyola	4	–	10	.286	6	–	11	.353
† 2021 Patriot League tournament winner

The 2020–21 Bucknell Bison men's basketball team represented Bucknell University in the 2020–21 NCAA Division I men's basketball season. The Bison, led by sixth-year head coach Nathan Davis, played their home games at Sojka Pavilion in Lewisburg, Pennsylvania as members of the Patriot League. With the creation of mini-divisions to cut down on travel due to the COVID-19 pandemic, they played in the Central Division.

== Previous season ==
The Bison finished the 2019–20 season 14–20, 8–10 in Patriot League play to finish in a tie for sixth place. They defeated Holy Cross and American to advance to the semifinals of the Patriot League tournament, where they lost to Boston University.

== Roster ==
2020–21 Bucknell Bison men's basketball team
Players
Coaches

Pos.	#	Name	Height	Weight	Year	Previous school	Hometown
C	0	Paul Newman	6 ft 9 in (2.06 m)	225 lb (102 kg)	Sr	St. Andrew's School	Philadelphia, PA
G	2	Walter Ellis	6 ft 5 in (1.96 m)	190 lb (86 kg)	Jr	Brewster Academy	Granger, IN
F	3	Malachi Rhodes	6 ft 8 in (2.03 m)	246 lb (112 kg)	So	Wheeler HS	Marietta, GA
G	4	Deuce Turner	6 ft 2 in (1.88 m)	181 lb (82 kg)	Fr	Malvern Prep	Coatesville, PA
G	5	Jordan Sechan	6 ft 1 in (1.85 m)	179 lb (81 kg)	Sr	Northfield Mount Hermon	New Canaan, CT
G	10	Andrew Funk	6 ft 5 in (1.96 m)	188 lb (85 kg)	Jr	Archbishop Wood HS	Warrington, PA
G	11	Josh Adoh	6 ft 3 in (1.91 m)	219 lb (99 kg)	Fr	Combine Academy	Bellflower, CA
F	12	John Meeks	6 ft 6 in (1.98 m)	224 lb (102 kg)	Sr	The Burlington School	Burlington, NC
G	20	Miles Latimer	6 ft 4 in (1.93 m)	186 lb (84 kg)	Jr	Stony Brook	Fairfax, VA
G	21	Xander Rice	6 ft 3 in (1.91 m)	184 lb (83 kg)	So	The Patrick School	West Long Branch, NJ
C	23	Andre Screen	7 ft 0 in (2.13 m)	231 lb (105 kg)	Fr	St. Stephen's & St. Agnes School	Alexandria, VA
G	25	Alek Delev	6 ft 0 in (1.83 m)	140 lb (64 kg)	Fr	Second English Language School	Sofia, Bulgaria
F	32	Jake van der Heijden	6 ft 9 in (2.06 m)	225 lb (102 kg)	So	Ravenscroft School	Raleigh, NC
C	40	Alex Timmerman	6 ft 9 in (2.06 m)	267 lb (121 kg)	So	Crystal Lake Central HS	Crystal Lake, IL

Head coach

- Nathan Davis (Randolph–Macon)

Assistant coach(es)

- Paul Harrison (Washington and Lee)
- Joe Meehan (Lebanon Valley)
- Johnathan Brown (Dominican (NY))

Legend

- (C) Team captain
- (S) Suspended
- (I) Ineligible
- (W) Walk-on
- Injured
- Current redshirt

Roster
Last update: January 31, 2021

== Schedule and results ==
Date time, TV	Rank^{#}	Opponent^{#}	Result	Record	Site (attendance) city, state
Patriot League regular season
January 2, 2021; 2:00 pm, ESPN+		at Navy	L 69–78	0–1 (0–1)	Alumni Hall; Annapolis, MD
January 3, 2021; 6:00 pm, CBSSN		Navy	L 60–63	0–2 (0–2)	Sojka Pavilion; Lewisburg, PA
January 9, 2021; 4:00 pm, ESPN+		Lafayette	L 60–83	0–3 (0–3)	Sojka Pavilion; Lewisburg, PA
January 10, 2021; 6:00 pm, SNY/ESPN+		at Lafayette	L 76–87	0–4 (0–4)	Kirby Sports Center; Easton, PA
January 16, 2021; 2:00 pm, WQMY/ESPN+		Lehigh	W 75–70	1–4 (1–4)	Sojka Pavilion; Lewisburg, PA
January 17, 2021; 4:00 pm, ESPN+		at Lehigh	W 77–61	2–4 (2–4)	Stabler Arena; Bethlehem, PA
January 23, 2021; 1:00 pm, ESPN+		at Colgate	Postponed		Cotterell Court; Hamilton, NY
January 24, 2021; 1:00 pm, ESPN+		at Colgate	Postponed		Cottrell Court; Hamilton, NY
January 30, 2021; 2:00 pm, ESPN+		at Lehigh	W 84–70	3–4 (3–4)	Stabler Arena; Bethlehem, PA
January 31, 2021; 2:00 pm, WQMY/ESPN+		Lehigh	W 92–68	4–4 (4–4)	Sojka Pavilion; Lewisburg, PA
February 6, 2021; 2:00 pm, ESPN+		at Loyola (MD)	Postponed		Reitz Arena; Baltimore, MD
February 8, 2021; 7:00 pm, CBSSN		Loyola (MD)	Postponed		Sojka Pavilion; Lewisburg, PA
February 20, 2021; 4:00 pm, ESPN+		at Lafayette	Postponed		Kirby Sports Center; Easton, PA
February 21, 2021; 6:00 pm, WQMY/ESPN+		Lafayette	Postponed		Sojka Pavilion; Lewisburg, PA
February 27, 2021; 2:00 pm, ESPN+		American	L 71–78	4–5 (4–5)	Sojka Pavilion; Lewisburg, PA
February 28, 2021; 4:00 pm, CBSSN		at American	L 68–81	4–6 (4–6)	Bender Arena; Washington, D.C.
Patriot League tournament
March 6, 2021; 2:00 pm, ESPN+	(6)	at (3) Lafayette; Quarterfinals	W 92–84	5–6	Kirby Sports Center; Easton, PA
March 10, 2021; 7:30 pm, CBSSN	(6)	at (2) Colgate; Semifinals	L 75–105	5–7	Cottrell Court; Hamilton, NY
*Non-conference game. ^{#}Rankings from AP Poll. (#) Tournament seedings in parentheses. All times are in Eastern.
