= 2021 Patriot League men's basketball tournament =

- Classification: Division I
- Season: 2020–21
- Teams: 10
- Site: Campus sites
- Champions: Colgate (4th title)
- Winning coach: Matt Langel (2nd title)
- MVP: Jordan Burns (Colgate)
- Television: ESPN+, CBSSN

2020–21 Patriot League men's basketball standings
	Conf.				Overall
Team	W		L	PCT	W		L	PCT
North
Colgate †	11	–	1	.917	14	–	2	.875
Army	7	–	7	.500	12	–	10	.545
Boston University	6	–	10	.375	7	–	11	.389
Holy Cross	5	–	11	.313	5	–	11	.313
Central
Lafayette	9	–	5	.643	9	–	6	.600
Bucknell	4	–	6	.400	5	–	7	.417
Lehigh	4	–	10	.286	4	–	11	.267
South
Navy	12	–	1	.923	15	–	3	.833
American	4	–	5	.444	4	–	6	.400
Loyola	4	–	10	.286	6	–	11	.353
† 2021 Patriot League tournament winner

The 2021 Patriot League men's basketball tournament was the conference postseason tournament for the Patriot League. The tournament was held March 3, 6, 10, and 14, 2021 at campus sites of the higher seeds. The winner received the conference's automatic bid to the NCAA tournament.

== Seeds ==
All ten teams in the conference standings qualified for the tournament. The teams were seeded by record in conference, with a tiebreaker system to seed teams with identical conference records.

The two tiebreakers used by the Patriot League are: 1) head-to-head record of teams with identical record and 2) NCAA NET Rankings available on day following the conclusion of Patriot League regular season play.

Seed	School	Conference	Tiebreaker
1	Navy	12–1	
2	Colgate	11–1	
3	Lafayette	9–5	
4	Army	7–7	
5	American	4–5	
6	Bucknell	4–6	
7	Boston University	6–10	
8	Holy Cross	5–11	
9	Loyola	4–10	Better NET Ranking than Lehigh
10	Lehigh	4–10	

== Schedule ==
Game	Time	Matchup	Score	Television	Attendance
First round – Wednesday, March 3
1	6:00 pm	No. 9 Loyola vs. No. 8 Holy Cross	Forfeit	ESPN+	N/A
2	7:00 pm	No. 10 Lehigh vs. No. 7 Boston University	58–69	ESPN+	
Quarterfinals – Saturday, March 6
1	12:00 pm	No. 9 Loyola vs. No. 1 Navy	76–68	ESPN+	
2	2:00 pm	No. 7 Boston University vs. No. 2 Colgate	69–77	ESPN+	
3	3:00 pm	No. 6 Bucknell vs. No. 3 Lafayette	92–84	ESPN+	
4	7:00 pm	No. 5 American vs. No. 4 Army	66–89	ESPN+	
Semifinals – Wednesday, March 10
5	4:30 pm	No. 9 Loyola vs. No. 4 Army	67–63	CBSSN	
6	7:45 pm	No. 6 Bucknell vs. No. 2 Colgate	75–105	CBSSN	
Championship – Sunday, March 14
7	12:00 pm	No. 9 Loyola vs. No. 2 Colgate	72–85	CBSSN	
Game times in ET. Rankings denote tournament seeding. All games hosted by higher-seeded team.

== Bracket ==
First round Wednesday, March 3, 2021; ESPN+
8	Holy Cross
9	Loyola	NC
7	Boston University	69
10	Lehigh	58

Quarterfinals; Saturday, March 6, 2021; ESPN+
1	Navy	68
9	Loyola	76
4	Army	89
5	American	66
2	Colgate	77
7	Boston University	69
3	Lafayette	84
6	Bucknell	92

Semifinals; Wednesday, March 10, 2021; CBSSN
9	Loyola	67
4	Army	63
2	Colgate	105
6	Bucknell	75

Championship; Sunday, March 14, 2021; CBSSN
9	Loyola	72
2	Colgate	85

== Game summaries ==
=== First round ===
ESPN+

March 3, 2021
7:00 p.m. EST

Report

No. 10 Lehigh Mountain Hawks 58, No. 7 Boston University Terriers 69
Scoring by half: 23–31, 35–38
Pts: M. Wilson – 19; Rebs: M. Wilson – 7 Asts: E. Taylor – 3	Pts: W. Whyte – 19; Rebs: J. Harper – 9 Asts: S. Mathon – 3

Case Gym – Boston, Massachusetts
Referees: Tim Kelly, Nathan Hall, Michael Palau

=== Quarterfinals ===
ESPN+

March 6, 2021
12:00 p.m. EST

Report

No. 9 Loyola Greyhounds 76, No. 1 Navy Midshipmen 68
Scoring by half: 40-28, 36-40
Pts: J. Andrews – 17; Rebs: S. Aldama – 12; Asts: C. Spencer – 7	Pts: G. Summers – 21; Rebs: D. Deaver – 5 Asts: D. Deaver – 6

Alumni Hall – Annapolis, Maryland
Referees: Dwayne Gladden, Phil Sallustio, Ed Corliss

ESPN+

March 6, 2021
2:00 p.m. EST

Report

No. 6 Bucknell Bison 92, No. 3 Lafayette Leopards 84
Scoring by half: 46-37, 46-47
Pts: J. Meeks – 31; Rebs: J. Meeks – 11; Asts: W. Ellis – 4	Pts: J. Jaworski – 28; Rebs: N. Quinn – 5 Asts: J. Jaworski – 5

Kirby Sports Center – Easton, Pennsylvania
Referees: Michael McCloskey, Sean Campbell, Michael Palau

ESPN+

March 6, 2021
3:00 p.m. EST

Report

No. 5 American Eagles 66, No. 4 Army Black Knights 89
Scoring by half: 29-47, 37-42
Pts: J. Harris – 18; Rebs: S. Beckton Jr., C. Smalls – 4 Asts: C. Nelson – 4	Pts: A. King – 20; Rebs: A. King – 9 Asts: J. Rucker – 5

Christl Arena – West Point, New York
Referees: Dave Fernandez, Brian Zink, Tom Deneen

ESPN+

March 6, 2021
7:00 p.m. EST

Report

No. 7 Boston University Terriers 69, No. 2 Colgate Raiders 77
Scoring by half: 26-34, 43-43
Pts: J. McCoy – 27; Rebs: S. Mathon – 14; Asts: S. Mathon, J. Harper, J. Hemphill – 2	Pts: T. Richardson, J. Burns, J. Ferguson – 16; Rebs: K. Records, R. Moffatt – 7 Asts: T. Richardson, J. Burns – 3

Cotterell Court – Hamilton, New York
Referees: Guy Pagano, Michael Luckie, Matt Lavigne

=== Semifinals ===
CBSSN

March 10, 2021
4:30 p.m. EST

Report

No. 9 Loyola Greyhounds 67, No. 4 Army Black Knights 63
Scoring by half: 42-27, 25-36
Pts: S. Aldama – 33; Rebs: S. Aldama – 12; Asts: K. Jones – 5	Pts: J. Rucker – 21; Rebs: J. Rucker – 6 Asts: J. Ricker – 2

Christl Arena – West Point, New York
Referees: Guy Pagano, Tony Crisp, Nathan Hall

CBSSN

March 10, 2021
7:45 p.m. EST

Report

No. 6 Bucknell Bison 75, No. 2 Colgate Raiders 105
Scoring by half: 35-58, 40-47
Pts: J. Meeks – 23; Rebs: A. Screen – 6 Asts: W. Ellis – 6	Pts: K. Records – 21; Rebs: T. Richardson – 9 Asts: J. Burns – 7

Cotterell Court – Hamilton, New York
Referees: Michael McCloskey, Ed Corbett Jr., Ed Corliss

=== Championship ===
CBSSN

March 14, 2021
12:00 p.m. EST

Report

No. 9 Loyola Greyhounds 72, No. 2 Colgate Raiders 85
Scoring by half: 33–38, 39–47
Pts: J. Andrews – 20; Rebs: S. Aldama – 7 Asts: S. Aldama – 3	Pts: T. Richardson – 17; Rebs: T. Richardson – 5 Asts: T. Richardson – 4

Cotterell Court – Hamilton, New York
Referees: Sean Hull, Tim Comer, Evon Burroughs
