= 2021 NCAA Division I men's basketball tournament =

2021 edition of NCAA Division 1 Men's college basketball tournament

- Season: 2020–21
- Teams: 68 (including one that did not play)
- Finals site: Lucas Oil Stadium, Indianapolis, Indiana
- Champions: Baylor Bears (1st title, 2nd title game, 3rd Final Four)
- Runner-up: Gonzaga Bulldogs (2nd title game, 2nd Final Four)
- Semifinalists: Houston Cougars (6th Final Four); UCLA Bruins (19th Final Four)
- Winning coach: Scott Drew (1st title)
- MOP: Jared Butler (Baylor)
- Attendance: 173,592
- Top scorer: Johnny Juzang (UCLA) (137 points)

The 2021 NCAA Division I men's basketball tournament was a single-elimination tournament of 68 teams to determine the National Collegiate Athletic Association (NCAA) Division I men's college basketball national champion for the 2020–21 season. The 82nd edition of the tournament began play on March 18, 2021, in sites around the state of Indiana, and concluded with the championship game at Lucas Oil Stadium in Indianapolis on April 5, with the Baylor Bears defeating the previously undefeated Gonzaga Bulldogs 86–70 to earn the team's first ever title.

For logistical considerations surrounding the ongoing COVID-19 pandemic (which resulted in the cancellation of the previous year's tournament), the NCAA announced in January 2021 that all tournament games would be held in Indiana rather than at sites across the country. This was the only time in the history of the tournament to date that a single state has hosted it in its entirety.

This marked the first time since 1976 that neither Duke or Kentucky qualified for the tournament. It was also the first time since 1995 that Duke failed to make the tournament, breaking a streak of 24 consecutive appearances. America East champion Hartford and WAC champion Grand Canyon made their NCAA Tournament debuts.

The tournament was marked by many upsets, with Yahoo Sports journalist Pete Thamel calling it "one of the most dizzying NCAA men's tournaments in history". With only half of the 16 second-round games having been played, there had been 11 upsets to that point, using the NCAA's definition of "upset" as a win by a team seeded five or more lines below its defeated opponent. This had already broken the record for most upsets prior to the round of 16; by the end of the second round, this number went up to 12. In addition, at least one team seeded #9 through #15 won a first-round game for the fourth time ever, and the first time since 2016. Also, a record four teams seeded 13 or lower won first-round games. Another notable mark set during the tournament was a record-breaking 14 upsets throughout the event, breaking the original record of 13 upsets from the 1985 and 2014 tournaments.

The Final Four game between UCLA and Gonzaga (the first semifinal game to go into overtime since 1998) saw a game-winning buzzer-beater by Jalen Suggs to take Gonzaga into the championship game, the first buzzer-beater in a national semifinal since 1977. By defeating Gonzaga in the championship game, the Baylor Bears became the second consecutive first-time NCAA champions, following the Virginia Cavaliers in 2019. The last time this happened was in 2002 and 2003, when the Maryland Terrapins and Syracuse Orange (then nicknamed Orangemen) won their first titles in their respective years. Baylor also joined Texas Western (now known as the University of Texas at El Paso) as the only two teams from the state of Texas to have won an NCAA Division I Basketball championship, the Miners having done so in 1966.

== Tournament procedure ==
A total of 68 teams entered the 2021 tournament, with 31 of them (down from 32, due to the Ivy League having canceled all winter semester sports due to COVID-19) having received an automatic bid by winning their conference's tournament. The remaining 37 bids were "at-large", with selections extended by the NCAA Selection Committee. Teams met sport sponsorship requirements and were considered for NCAA championship selection if they played 13 games, which represented a 50 percent reduction of the current minimum. For NCAA championship consideration, all 13 games had to be against other Division I opponents. Teams could also play 12 regular-season games against Division I opponents and one conference tournament game to be eligible for tournament consideration.

The Selection Committee seeded the entire field from 1 to 68. The four lowest-seeded automatic qualifiers and the four lowest-seeded at-large teams played in the First Four round: for the 2021 tournament, the games were played between the overall 65th and 66th seeds, the 67th and 68th seed, and the last four at-large seeds.

The top four teams outside of the ranking (commonly known as the "first four out" in pre-tourney analyses) acted as standbys in the event a school was forced to withdraw from the tournament due to COVID-19 protocols. However, if a team withdrew within 48 hours of the tournament's commencement, they would not be replaced; the bracket was not reseeded, and the affected team's opponent would automatically advance to the next round. The replacement teams are as follows, in order:

First Four Out
NET	School	Conference	Record
56	Louisville	ACC	13–7
51	Colorado State	Mountain West	18–6
43	Saint Louis	Atlantic 10	14–6
53	Ole Miss	SEC	16–11

== Schedule and venues ==
2021 NCAA tournament venues

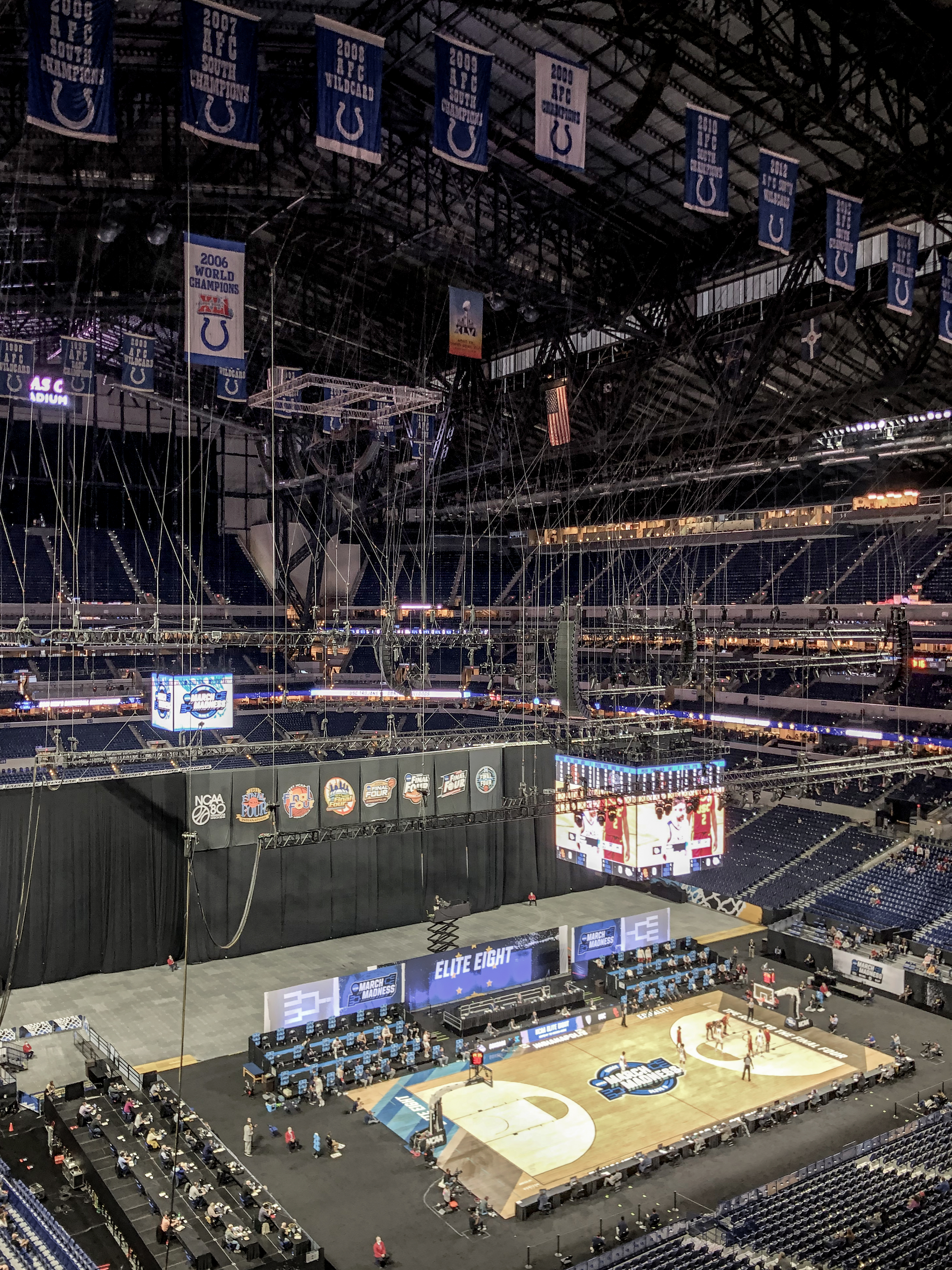
Gonzaga vs. University of Southern California at Lucas Oil Stadium

On January 4, 2021, the NCAA announced that due to logistical considerations associated with the COVID-19 pandemic (which prompted the cancellation of the 2020 tournament), the entirety of the tournament would be conducted at sites within the Indianapolis metro area and central Indiana, rather than across the country. Players stayed at hotels near the Indiana Convention Center, which served as the main practice facility. Lucas Oil Stadium had two courts named "Unity Court" and "Equality Court" during the First Round, Second Round, and Elite Eight.

On February 19, it was announced that all venues would operate at a maximum of 25% capacity. As this capacity includes staff and players, the exact number of spectators varied by venue. Artificial crowd noise was used at all venues to augment the limited in-person attendance.

This tournament marked the first time ever that Indiana Farmers Coliseum was a tournament venue, the first time since 2017 that Bankers Life Fieldhouse was a tournament venue, the first time since 1940 that Hinkle Fieldhouse was a tournament venue, the first time since 1980 that Mackey Arena was a tournament venue, and the first time since 1981 that Assembly Hall was a tournament venue.

First Four:

- Thursday, March 18
  - Mackey Arena, West Lafayette, Indiana (Host: Purdue University)
  - Simon Skjodt Assembly Hall, Bloomington, Indiana (Host: Indiana University Bloomington)

First and Second Rounds:

- Friday, March 19 and Saturday, March 20
  - Mackey Arena, West Lafayette, Indiana (Host: Purdue University)
  - Simon Skjodt Assembly Hall, Bloomington, Indiana (Host: Indiana University Bloomington)
  - Bankers Life Fieldhouse, Indianapolis, Indiana (Host: Ball State University)
  - Hinkle Fieldhouse, Indianapolis, Indiana (Host: Butler University)
  - Indiana Farmers Coliseum, Indianapolis, Indiana (Host: IUPUI)
  - Lucas Oil Stadium, Indianapolis, Indiana (Unity Court and Equality Court) (Hosts: IUPUI, Horizon League)
- Sunday, March 21 and Monday, March 22
  - Bankers Life Fieldhouse, Indianapolis, Indiana (Host: Ball State University)
  - Hinkle Fieldhouse, Indianapolis, Indiana (Host: Butler University)
  - Indiana Farmers Coliseum, Indianapolis, Indiana (Host: IUPUI)
  - Lucas Oil Stadium, Indianapolis, Indiana (Unity Court and Equality Court) (Hosts: IUPUI, Horizon League)

Regional Semifinals and Finals (Sweet Sixteen and Elite Eight):

- Saturday, March 27 and Sunday, March 28
  - Bankers Life Fieldhouse, Indianapolis, Indiana (Host: Ball State University)
  - Hinkle Fieldhouse, Indianapolis, Indiana (Host: Butler University)
- Monday, March 29 and Tuesday, March 30
  - Lucas Oil Stadium, Indianapolis, Indiana (Unity Court and Equality Court) (Hosts: IUPUI, Horizon League)

National Semifinals and Championship (Final Four and Championship):

- Saturday, April 3 and Monday, April 5
  - Lucas Oil Stadium, Indianapolis, Indiana (Hosts: IUPUI, Horizon League)

=== Original 2021 NCAA Tournament schedule and venues ===
2021 First Four (orange) and First and Second Rounds (green) as originally selected.

2021 Regionals (blue) and Final Four (red) as originally selected.

The following sites were originally selected to host each round of the 2021 tournament; with the exceptions of Boise, all cities and venues listed have hosted or are scheduled to host tournament games after 2021:

First Four

- March 16 and 17
  - University of Dayton Arena, Dayton, Ohio (Host: University of Dayton)

First and Second Rounds

- March 18 and 20
  - Dunkin' Donuts Center, Providence, Rhode Island (Host: Providence College)
  - ExtraMile Arena, Boise, Idaho (Host: Boise State University)
  - Little Caesars Arena, Detroit, Michigan (Hosts: University of Detroit Mercy, Oakland University)
  - American Airlines Center, Dallas, Texas (Host: Big 12 Conference)
- March 19 and 21
  - Intrust Bank Arena, Wichita, Kansas (Host: Wichita State University)
  - Rupp Arena, Lexington, Kentucky (Host: University of Kentucky)
  - PNC Arena, Raleigh, North Carolina (Host: North Carolina State University)
  - SAP Center, San Jose, California (Host: West Coast Conference)

Regional Semifinals and Finals (Sweet Sixteen and Elite Eight)

- March 25 and 27
  - Midwest Regional, Target Center, Minneapolis, Minnesota (Host: University of Minnesota, Twin Cities)
  - West Regional, Ball Arena, Denver, Colorado (Host: Mountain West Conference)
- March 26 and 28
  - South Regional, FedExForum, Memphis, Tennessee (Host: University of Memphis)
  - East Regional, Barclays Center, Brooklyn, New York (Host: Atlantic 10 Conference)

National Semifinals and Championship (Final Four and Championship)

- April 3 and 5
  - Lucas Oil Stadium, Indianapolis, Indiana (Hosts: IUPUI, Horizon League)

== Qualification and selection ==
=== Automatic qualifiers ===
Conference	Team	Appearance	Last bid
America East	Hartford	1st	Never
American	Houston	22nd	2019
Atlantic 10	St. Bonaventure	8th	2018
ACC	Georgia Tech	17th	2010
ASUN	Liberty	5th	2019
Big 12	Texas	35th	2018
Big East	Georgetown	31st	2015
Big Sky	Eastern Washington	3rd	2015
Big South	Winthrop	11th	2017
Big Ten	Illinois	31st	2013
Big West	UC Santa Barbara	6th	2011
CAA	Drexel	5th	1996
C-USA	North Texas	4th	2010
Horizon	Cleveland State	3rd	2009
Ivy League	Season not played		
MAAC	Iona	15th	2019
MAC	Ohio	14th	2012
MEAC	Norfolk State	2nd	2012
Missouri Valley	Loyola Chicago	7th	2018
Mountain West	San Diego State	13th	2018
NEC	Mount St. Mary's	6th	2017
Ohio Valley	Morehead State	8th	2011
Pac-12	Oregon State	15th	2016
Patriot	Colgate	4th	2019
SEC	Alabama	22nd	2018
Southern	UNC Greensboro	4th	2018
Southland	Abilene Christian	2nd	2019
SWAC	Texas Southern	9th	2018
Summit League	Oral Roberts	6th	2008
Sun Belt	Appalachian State	3rd	2000
WAC	Grand Canyon	1st	Never
WCC	Gonzaga	23rd	2019

=== Tournament seeds ===
The tournament seeds and regions were determined through the NCAA basketball tournament selection process.

In contrast to previous years, the S-Curve used to establish overall seeds will also be used as primary determinant of the tournament bracket; this was made possible by the relatively condensed locations of this year's tournament making geographic concerns irrelevant. However, rules that can modify pairings to avoid early rematches and to distribute top conference representatives to different regions will remain in effect.

West Regional
Seed	School	Conference	Record	Overall Seed	Berth type	Last bid
1	Gonzaga	West Coast	26–0	1	Automatic	2019
2	Iowa	Big Ten	21–8	7	At-Large	2019
3	Kansas	Big 12	20–8	12	At-Large	2019
4	Virginia	ACC	18–6	16	At-Large	2019
5	Creighton	Big East	20–8	17	At-Large	2018
6	USC	Pac-12	22–7	21	At-Large	2017
7	Oregon	Pac-12	20–6	25	At-Large	2019
8	Oklahoma	Big 12	15–10	32	At-Large	2019
9	Missouri	SEC	16–9	33	At-Large	2018
10	VCU	Atlantic 10	19–7	38	At-Large	2019
11*	Wichita State	American	16–5	45	At-Large	2018
11*	Drake	Missouri Valley	25–4	48	At-Large	2008
12	UC Santa Barbara	Big West	22–4	50	Automatic	2011
13	Ohio	MAC	16–7	51	Automatic	2012
14	Eastern Washington	Big Sky	16–7	58	Automatic	2015
15	Grand Canyon	WAC	17–6	59	Automatic	Never
16*	Norfolk State	MEAC	16–7	67	Automatic	2012
16*	Appalachian State	Sun Belt	17–11	68	Automatic	2000

South Regional
Seed	School	Conference	Record	Overall Seed	Berth type	Last bid
1	Baylor	Big 12	22–2	2	At-Large	2019
2	Ohio State	Big Ten	21–9	6	At-Large	2019
3	Arkansas	SEC	22–6	9	At-Large	2018
4	Purdue	Big Ten	18–9	14	At-Large	2019
5	Villanova	Big East	16–6	18	At-Large	2019
6	Texas Tech	Big 12	17–10	22	At-Large	2019
7	Florida	SEC	14–9	28	At-Large	2019
8	North Carolina	ACC	18–10	31	At-Large	2019
9	Wisconsin	Big Ten	17–12	35	At-Large	2019
10	Virginia Tech	ACC	15–6	37	At-Large	2019
11	Utah State	Mountain West	20–8	42	At-Large	2019
12	Winthrop	Big South	23–1	49	Automatic	2017
13	North Texas	C-USA	17–9	52	Automatic	2010
14	Colgate	Patriot	14–1	57	Automatic	2019
15	Oral Roberts	Summit	16–10	61	Automatic	2008
16	Hartford	America East	15–8	64	Automatic	Never

East Regional
Seed	School	Conference	Record	Overall Seed	Berth type	Last bid
1	Michigan	Big Ten	20–4	4	At-Large	2019
2	Alabama	SEC	24–6	5	Automatic	2018
3	Texas	Big 12	19–7	11	Automatic	2018
4	Florida State	ACC	16–6	13	At-Large	2019
5	Colorado	Pac-12	22–8	20	At-Large	2016
6	BYU	West Coast	20–6	23	At-Large	2015
7	UConn	Big East	15–7	26	At-Large	2016
8	LSU	SEC	18–9	29	At-Large	2019
9	St. Bonaventure	Atlantic 10	16–4	39	Automatic	2018
10	Maryland	Big Ten	16–13	36	At-Large	2019
11*	Michigan State	Big Ten	15–12	43	At-Large	2019
11*	UCLA	Pac-12	17–9	44	At-Large	2018
12	Georgetown	Big East	13–12	47	Automatic	2015
13	UNC Greensboro	Southern	21–8	54	Automatic	2018
14	Abilene Christian	Southland	23–4	55	Automatic	2019
15	Iona	MAAC	12–5	62	Automatic	2019
16*	Mount St. Mary's	Northeast	12–10	65	Automatic	2017
16*	Texas Southern	SWAC	16–8	66	Automatic	2018

Midwest Regional
Seed	School	Conference	Record	Overall Seed	Berth type	Last bid
1	Illinois	Big Ten	23–6	3	Automatic	2013
2	Houston	American	24–3	8	Automatic	2019
3	West Virginia	Big 12	18–9	10	At-Large	2018
4	Oklahoma State	Big 12	20–8	15	At-Large	2017
5	Tennessee	SEC	18–8	19	At-Large	2019
6	San Diego State	Mountain West	23–4	24	Automatic	2018
7	Clemson	ACC	16–7	27	At-Large	2018
8	Loyola Chicago	Missouri Valley	24–4	30	Automatic	2018
9	Georgia Tech	ACC	17–8	34	Automatic	2010
10	Rutgers	Big Ten	15–11	40	At-Large	1991
11	Syracuse	ACC	16–9	41	At-Large	2019
12	Oregon State	Pac-12	17–12	46	Automatic	2016
13	Liberty	Atlantic Sun	23–5	53	Automatic	2019
14	Morehead State	Ohio Valley	23–7	56	Automatic	2011
15	Cleveland State	Horizon	19–7	60	Automatic	2009
16	Drexel	Colonial	12–7	63	Automatic	1996

*See First Four

== Tournament bracket ==
Note: Unlike past tournaments, teams are not grouped as pods. Second round games will match teams that played at different venues in the first round.

=== First Four ===
The First Four games involved eight teams: the four overall lowest-ranked teams, and the four lowest-ranked at-large teams.

March 18 – West Regional; Simon Skjodt Assembly Hall; Bloomington
16	Norfolk State	54
16	Appalachian State	53

March 18 – West Regional; Mackey Arena; West Lafayette
11	Wichita State	52
11	Drake	53

March 18 – East Regional; Mackey Arena; West Lafayette
11	Michigan State	80
11	UCLA	86^{OT}

March 18 – East Regional; Simon Skjodt Assembly Hall; Bloomington
16	Mount St. Mary's	52
16	Texas Southern	60

=== West Regional ===
First Round; Round of 64; Saturday, March 20
Bankers Life Fieldhouse
1	Gonzaga	98
16	Norfolk State	55
Lucas Oil Stadium – Equality
8	Oklahoma	72
9	Missouri	68
Lucas Oil Stadium – Unity
5	Creighton	63
12	UC Santa Barbara	62
Simon Skjodt Assembly Hall
4	Virginia	58
13	Ohio	62
Bankers Life Fieldhouse
6	USC	72
11	Drake	56
Indiana Farmers Coliseum
3	Kansas	93
14	Eastern Washington	84
Indiana Farmers Coliseum
7	Oregon	WO
10	VCU (Note: Game declared no contest due to COVID-19 protocols with VCU. Oregon advances in the tournament.)
Indiana Farmers Coliseum
2	Iowa	86
15	Grand Canyon	74

Second Round; Round of 32; Monday, March 22
Hinkle Fieldhouse
1	Gonzaga	87
8	Oklahoma	71
Hinkle Fieldhouse
5	Creighton	72
13	Ohio	58
Hinkle Fieldhouse
6	USC	85
3	Kansas	51
Bankers Life Fieldhouse
7	Oregon	95
2	Iowa	80

Regional Semifinals; Sweet 16; Sunday, March 28
Hinkle Fieldhouse
1	Gonzaga	83
5	Creighton	65
Bankers Life Fieldhouse
6	USC	82
7	Oregon	68

Regional Final; Elite 8 Tuesday, March 30
Lucas Oil Stadium – Equality
1	Gonzaga	85
6	USC	66

==== West Regional Final ====
TBS

March 30
7:15 pm EDT

Box score

#6 USC Trojans 66, #1 Gonzaga Bulldogs 85
Scoring by half: 30–49, 36–36
Pts: I. Mobley, 19; Rebs: I. Mobley, 7 Asts: I. Mobley, E. Mobley, 3	Pts: D. Timme, 23; Rebs: J. Suggs, 10; Asts: J. Suggs, 8

Equality Court – Lucas Oil Stadium
Indianapolis, Indiana
Attendance: 6,166
Referees: Randy McCall, Doug Shows, Bert Smith, Tony Henderson

==== West Regional all tournament team ====
- Drew Timme, Gonzaga (MOP)
- Corey Kispert, Gonzaga
- Evan Mobley, USC
- Isaiah Mobley, USC
- Jalen Suggs, Gonzaga

=== East Regional ===
First round Round of 64; Saturday, March 20
Mackey Arena
1	Michigan	82
16	Texas Southern	66
Simon Skjodt Assembly Hall
8	LSU	76
9	St. Bonaventure	61
Hinkle Fieldhouse
5	Colorado	96
12	Georgetown	73
Bankers Life Fieldhouse
4	Florida State	64
13	UNC Greensboro	54
Hinkle Fieldhouse
6	BYU	62
11	UCLA	73
Lucas Oil Stadium – Unity
3	Texas	52
14	Abilene Christian	53
Mackey Arena
7	UConn	54
10	Maryland	63
Hinkle Fieldhouse
2	Alabama	68
15	Iona	55

Second Round; Round of 32; Monday, March 22
Lucas Oil Stadium – Unity
1	Michigan	86
8	LSU	78
Indiana Farmers Coliseum
5	Colorado	53
4	Florida State	71
Bankers Life Fieldhouse
11	UCLA	67
14	Abilene Christian	47
Bankers Life Fieldhouse
10	Maryland	77
2	Alabama	96

Regional Semifinals; Sweet 16; Sunday, March 28
Bankers Life Fieldhouse
1	Michigan	76
4	Florida State	58
Hinkle Fieldhouse
11	UCLA	88^{OT}
2	Alabama	78

Regional Final; Elite 8 Tuesday, March 30
Lucas Oil Stadium – Unity
1	Michigan	49
11	UCLA	51

==== East Regional Final ====
TBS

March 30
9:57 pm EDT

Box score

#11 UCLA Bruins 51, #1 Michigan Wolverines 49
Scoring by half: 27–23, 24–26
Pts: J. Juzang, 28; Rebs: J. Bernard, 9 Asts: J. Jaquez Jr., 4	Pts: H. Dickinson, 11; Rebs: C. Brown Jr., 9 Asts: E. Brooks, M. Smith, 4

Unity Court – Lucas Oil Stadium
Indianapolis, Indiana
Attendance: 7,515
Referees: Bo Boroski, Verne Harris, Lee Cassell

==== East Regional all tournament team ====
- Johnny Juzang, UCLA (MOP)
- Chaundee Brown Jr., Michigan
- Tyger Campbell, UCLA
- Hunter Dickinson, Michigan
- Jaime Jaquez Jr., UCLA

=== South Regional ===
First round Round of 64; Friday, March 19
Lucas Oil Stadium – Unity
1	Baylor	79
16	Hartford	55
Mackey Arena
8	North Carolina	62
9	Wisconsin	85
Indiana Farmers Coliseum
5	Villanova	73
12	Winthrop	63
Lucas Oil Stadium – Equality
4	Purdue	69
13	North Texas	78^{OT}
Simon Skjodt Assembly Hall
6	Texas Tech	65
11	Utah State	53
Bankers Life Fieldhouse
3	Arkansas	85
14	Colgate	68
Hinkle Fieldhouse
7	Florida	75^{OT}
10	Virginia Tech	70
Mackey Arena
2	Ohio State	72
15	Oral Roberts	75^{OT}

Second Round; Round of 32; Sunday, March 21
Hinkle Fieldhouse
1	Baylor	76
9	Wisconsin	63
Bankers Life Fieldhouse
5	Villanova	84
13	North Texas	61
Hinkle Fieldhouse
6	Texas Tech	66
3	Arkansas	68
Indiana Farmers Coliseum
7	Florida	78
15	Oral Roberts	81

Regional semifinals Sweet 16; Saturday, March 27
Hinkle Fieldhouse
1	Baylor	62
5	Villanova	51
Bankers Life Fieldhouse
3	Arkansas	72
15	Oral Roberts	70

Regional Final; Elite 8 Monday, March 29
Lucas Oil Stadium – Unity
1	Baylor	81
3	Arkansas	72

==== South Regional Final ====
CBS

March 29
9:57 pm EDT

Box score

#3 Arkansas Razorbacks 72, #1 Baylor Bears 81
Scoring by half: 38–46, 34–35
Pts: D. Davis, J. Notae, 14; Rebs: J. Smith, D. Davis, D. Sills, 6 Asts: D. Sills, 4	Pts: M. Teague, 22; Rebs: J. Tchamwa Tchatchoua, 6 Asts: D. Mitchell, 6

Unity Court – Lucas Oil Stadium
Indianapolis, Indiana
Attendance: 7,519
Referees: Terry Oglesby, Jeff Clark, Paul Szelc

==== South Regional all tournament team ====
- Davion Mitchell, Baylor (MOP)
- Max Abmas, Oral Roberts
- Jared Butler, Baylor
- Jalen Tate, Arkansas
- MaCio Teague, Baylor

=== Midwest Regional ===
First round Round of 64; Friday, March 19
Indiana Farmers Coliseum
1	Illinois	78
16	Drexel	49
Hinkle Fieldhouse
8	Loyola Chicago	71
9	Georgia Tech	60
Bankers Life Fieldhouse
5	Tennessee	56
12	Oregon State	70
Indiana Farmers Coliseum
4	Oklahoma State	69
13	Liberty	60
Hinkle Fieldhouse
6	San Diego State	62
11	Syracuse	78
Lucas Oil Stadium – Unity
3	West Virginia	84
14	Morehead State	67
Bankers Life Fieldhouse
7	Clemson	56
10	Rutgers	60
Simon Skjodt Assembly Hall
2	Houston	87
15	Cleveland State	56

Second Round; Round of 32; Sunday, March 21
Bankers Life Fieldhouse
1	Illinois	58
8	Loyola Chicago	71
Hinkle Fieldhouse
12	Oregon State	80
4	Oklahoma State	70
Bankers Life Fieldhouse
11	Syracuse	75
3	West Virginia	72
Lucas Oil Stadium – Unity
10	Rutgers	60
2	Houston	63

Regional Semifinals; Sweet 16; Saturday, March 27
Bankers Life Fieldhouse
8	Loyola Chicago	58
12	Oregon State	65
Hinkle Fieldhouse
11	Syracuse	46
2	Houston	62

Regional Final; Elite 8 Monday, March 29
Lucas Oil Stadium – Equality
12	Oregon State	61
2	Houston	67

==== Midwest Regional Final ====
CBS

March 29
7:15 pm EDT

Box score

#12 Oregon State Beavers 61, #2 Houston Cougars 67
Scoring by half: 17–34, 44–33
Pts: M. Calloo, 13; Rebs: E. Thompson, 7 Asts: E. Thompson, 6	Pts: M. Sasser, 20; Rebs: J. Gorham, 10; Asts: D. Jarreau, 8

Equality Court – Lucas Oil Stadium
Indianapolis, Indiana
Attendance: 7,519
Referees: Ron Groover, Jeff Anderson, Mike Reed

==== Midwest Regional all tournament team ====
- DeJon Jarreau, Houston (MOP)
- Quentin Grimes, Houston
- Cameron Krutwig, Loyola Chicago
- Marcus Sasser, Houston
- Ethan Thompson, Oregon State

=== Final Four – Lucas Oil Stadium ===
National Semifinals; Saturday, April 3
W1	Gonzaga	93^{OT}
E11	UCLA	90
S1	Baylor	78
MW2	Houston	59

National Championship Game; Monday, April 5
W1	Gonzaga	70
S1	Baylor	86

==== National semifinals ====
CBS

April 3
5:14 pm EDT

Box score

S1 Baylor Bears 78, MW2 Houston Cougars 59
Scoring by half: 45–20, 33–39
Pts: J. Butler, 17; Rebs: J. Tchamwa Tchatchoua, 6 Asts: D. Mitchell, 11	Pts: M. Sasser, 20; Rebs: J. Gorham, 6 Asts: J. Gorham, 3

Lucas Oil Stadium – Indianapolis, Indiana
Attendance: 8,131
Referees: Doug Sirmons, Pat Adams, Chris Rastatter

CBS

April 3
8:34 pm EDT

Box score

W1 Gonzaga Bulldogs 93, E11 UCLA Bruins 90 (OT)
Scoring by half: 45–44, 36–37 Overtime: 12–9
Pts: D. Timme, 25; Rebs: J. Ayayi, 6 Asts: A. Nembhard, 8	Pts: J. Juzang, 29; Rebs: C. Riley, 10; Asts: T. Campbell, 7

Lucas Oil Stadium – Indianapolis, Indiana
Attendance: 8,131
Referees: Ron Groover, Jeff Anderson, James Breeding

==== National championship ====
CBS

April 5
9:20 pm EDT

Box score

S1 Baylor Bears 86, W1 Gonzaga Bulldogs 70
Scoring by half: 47–37, 39–33
Pts: J. Butler, 22; Rebs: M. Vital, 11; Asts: J. Butler, 7	Pts: J. Suggs, 22; Rebs: D. Timme, 5 Asts: A. Nembhard, 4

Lucas Oil Stadium – Indianapolis, Indiana
Referees: Randy McCall, Bo Boroski, Keith Kimble

==== Final Four all-tournament team ====
- Jared Butler, Baylor (MOP)
- Johnny Juzang, UCLA
- Davion Mitchell, Baylor
- Jalen Suggs, Gonzaga
- Drew Timme, Gonzaga

== Game summaries and tournament notes ==
=== Upsets ===
Per the NCAA, "Upsets are defined as when the winner of the game was seeded five or more places lower than the team it defeated."

The 2021 tournament saw a record total of 14 upsets, with seven in the first round, five in the second round, one in the Sweet Sixteen, and one in the Elite Eight.

Upsets in the 2021 NCAA Division I men's basketball tournament
Round	West	East	South	Midwest
Round of 64	No. 13 Ohio defeated No. 4 Virginia, 62–58	No. 14 Abilene Christian defeated No. 3 Texas, 53–52; No. 11 UCLA defeated No. 6 BYU, 73–62	No. 15 Oral Roberts defeated No. 2 Ohio State, 75–72 ^{OT}; No. 13 North Texas defeated No. 4 Purdue, 78–69 ^{OT}	No. 12 Oregon State defeated No. 5 Tennessee, 70–56; No. 11 Syracuse defeated No. 6 San Diego State, 78–62
Round of 32	No. 7 Oregon defeated No. 2 Iowa, 95–80	None	No. 15 Oral Roberts defeated No. 7 Florida, 81–78	No. 12 Oregon State defeated No. 4 Oklahoma State, 80–70; No. 11 Syracuse defeated No. 3 West Virginia, 75–72; No. 8 Loyola Chicago defeated No. 1 Illinois, 71–58
Sweet 16	None	No. 11 UCLA defeated No. 2 Alabama, 88–78 ^{OT}	None	
Elite 8	None	No. 11 UCLA defeated No. 1 Michigan, 51–49	None	
Final 4	None			
National Championship	None			

== Record by conference ==
Conference	Bids	Record	Win %	FF	R64	R32	S16	E8	F4	CG	NC
Big 12	7	11–6	.647	–	7	6	1	1	1	1	1
WCC	2	5–2	.714	–	2	1	1	1	1	1	–
American	2	4–2	.667	1	1	1	1	1	1	–	–
Pac-12	5	13–5	.722	1	5^{†}	5	4	3	1	–	–
Big Ten	9	8–9	.471	1	8	6	1	1	–	–	–
SEC	6	7–6	.538	–	6	4	2	1	–	–	–
ACC	7	4–7	.364	–	7	2	2	–	–	–	–
Big East	4	4–4	.500	–	4	2	2	–	–	–	–
Missouri Valley	2	3–2	.600	1	2	1	1	–	–	–	–
Summit	1	2–1	.667	–	1	1	1	–	–	–	–
C-USA	1	1–1	.500	–	1	1	–	–	–	–	–
MAC	1	1–1	.500	–	1	1	–	–	–	–	–
Southland	1	1–1	.500	–	1	1	–	–	–	–	–
MEAC	1	1–1	.500	1	1	–	–	–	–	–	–
SWAC	1	1–1	.500	1	1	–	–	–	–	–	–
Atlantic 10	2	0–1	.000	–	2^{†}	–	–	–	–	–	–
Mountain West	2	0–2	.000	–	2	–	–	–	–	–	–
America East	1	0–1	.000	–	1	–	–	–	–	–	–
Atlantic Sun	1	0–1	.000	–	1	–	–	–	–	–	–
Big Sky	1	0–1	.000	–	1	–	–	–	–	–	–
Big South	1	0–1	.000	–	1	–	–	–	–	–	–
Big West	1	0–1	.000	–	1	–	–	–	–	–	–
Colonial	1	0–1	.000	–	1	–	–	–	–	–	–
Horizon	1	0–1	.000	–	1	–	–	–	–	–	–
MAAC	1	0–1	.000	–	1	–	–	–	–	–	–
Ohio Valley	1	0–1	.000	–	1	–	–	–	–	–	–
Patriot	1	0–1	.000	–	1	–	–	–	–	–	–
Southern	1	0–1	.000	–	1	–	–	–	–	–	–
WAC	1	0–1	.000	–	1	–	–	–	–	–	–
Northeast	1	0–1	.000	1	–	–	–	–	–	–	–
Sun Belt	1	0–1	.000	1	–	–	–	–	–	–	–

^{†} Includes a game declared no-contest due to COVID-19 protocols with VCU. Oregon of the Pac-12 conference advanced to the second round and VCU of the Atlantic 10 conference was eliminated from the tournament.

- The FF, R64, R32, S16, E8, F4, CG, and NC columns indicate how many teams from each conference were in the First Four, Round of 64 (first round), Round of 32 (second round), Regional semifinals (Sweet 16), Regional Finals (Elite Eight), National semifinals (Final Four), National Championship Game, and national champion, respectively.
- The Record column does not include wins or losses in games declared no-contest.

== Media coverage ==
=== Television ===
CBS Sports and Turner Sports had US television rights to the tournament. As part of a cycle that began in 2016, CBS televised the 2021 Final Four and the national championship game. Because the 2020 tournament had been cancelled due to COVID-19 concerns, the last two rounds in back-to-back editions were broadcast on CBS for the first time since 2015 (TBS would have broadcast the 2020 Final Four and National Championship according to the arrangement).

==== Television channels ====
- First Four – truTV and TBS
- First and Second Rounds – CBS, TBS, TNT, and truTV
- Regional semifinals and Final (Sweet Sixteen and Elite Eight) – CBS and TBS
- National semifinals (Final Four) and championship – CBS

==== Studio hosts ====
- Greg Gumbel (New York City and Indianapolis) – First Four, first round, second round, Regionals, Final Four and National Championship Game
- Ernie Johnson (Atlanta and Indianapolis) – First Four, first round, second round, Regionals and Final Four
- Adam Zucker (New York City) – First round and Second round
- Matt Winer (Atlanta) – First round (Game Breaks)

==== Studio analysts ====
- Charles Barkley (Atlanta and Indianapolis) – First Four, first round, second round, Regionals, Final Four and National Championship Game
- Seth Davis (New York City and Indianapolis) – First Four, first round, second round, Regionals, Final Four and National Championship Game
- Jim Jackson (Indianapolis) – National Championship Game
- Andy Katz (Atlanta) – First Four, first round, second round and Regionals
- Clark Kellogg (New York City and Indianapolis) – First Four, first round, second round, Regionals, Final Four and National Championship Game
- Candace Parker (Indianapolis) – Final Four
- Kenny Smith (Atlanta and Indianapolis) – First Four, first round, second round, Regionals, Final Four and National Championship Game
- Gene Steratore (New York City and Indianapolis) (Rules Analyst) – First Four, first round, second round, Regionals, Final Four and National Championship Game
- Wally Szczerbiak (New York City) – First Four, first round, second round and Regionals

==== Commentary teams ====
- Jim Nantz/Bill Raftery/Grant Hill/Tracy Wolfson – First round at Hinkle Fieldhouse; Second Round and Regional Semi-finals at Bankers Life Fieldhouse (Sunday); South Regional Final at Lucas Oil Stadium Unity (South); Final Four and National Championship at Lucas Oil Stadium
  - Hill joined Nantz, Raftery and Wolfson during the Regionals, Final Four and National Championship Games.
- Brian Anderson/Jim Jackson/Allie LaForce – First Four at Mackey Arena; First and Second Rounds at Bankers Life Fieldhouse; Regional Semi-finals at Hinkle Fieldhouse (Saturday); West Regional Final at Lucas Oil Stadium Unity (South)
- Ian Eagle/Grant Hill or Jim Spanarkel/Jamie Erdahl – First round at Mackey Arena; Second Round and Regional Semi-finals at Hinkle Fieldhouse (Sunday); Midwest Regional Final at Lucas Oil Stadium Equality (North)
  - Hill called the First & Second Rounds, Spanarkel did the Regionals.
- Kevin Harlan/Dan Bonner/Dana Jacobson – First round at Indiana Farmers Coliseum; Second Round at Hinkle Fieldhouse; Regional Semi-finals at Bankers Life Fieldhouse (Saturday); East Regional Final at Lucas Oil Stadium Equality (North)
- Brad Nessler/Steve Lavin/Avery Johnson (First Four only)/Evan Washburn – First Four at Assembly Hall; First and Second Rounds at Indiana Farmers Coliseum
- Spero Dedes/Brendan Haywood/Lauren Shehadi – First round at Bankers Life Fieldhouse; Second Round at Lucas Oil Stadium Unity (South)
- Andrew Catalon/Steve Lappas/AJ Ross – First and Second Rounds at Hinkle Fieldhouse
- Carter Blackburn/Debbie Antonelli/Evan Washburn (Friday)/Dana Jacobson (Saturday)/Lauren Shehadi (Monday) – First round at Assembly Hall; Second Round at Hinkle Fieldhouse
- Lisa Byington/Steve Smith/AJ Ross (Friday & Sunday)/Lauren Shehadi (Saturday) – First round at Lucas Oil Stadium Unity (South); Second Round at Indiana Farmers Coliseum
- Tom McCarthy/Avery Johnson/AJ Ross (Friday)/Lauren Shehadi (Saturday) – First round at Lucas Oil Stadium Equality (North)

ESPN International had international rights to the tournament. Coverage used CBS/Turner play-by-play teams until the Final Four.

- Sean McDonough/Jay Bilas or Dick Vitale - Final Four and National Championship at Lucas Oil Stadium
  - Bilas did UCLA vs. Gonzaga, Vitale did Houston vs. Baylor and the National Championship Game

==== Most-watched tournament games ====
All times Eastern. Tournament seedings and region are in parentheses.

Rank	Round	Date	Matchup				Network	Viewers (millions)	TV Rating
1	National Championship	April 5, 2021, 9:20 ET	(1 S) Baylor	86	(1 W) Gonzaga	70	CBS	16.92	9.4
2	Final Four	April 3, 2021, 8:34 ET	(11 E) UCLA	90	(1 W) Gonzaga	93	CBS	14.94	7.6
3	Sweet 16	March 28, 2021 5:00 ET	(4 E) Florida State	58	(1 E) Michigan	76	CBS	9.03	5.1
4	Final Four	April 3, 2021, 5:14 ET	(2 MW) Houston	59	(1 S) Baylor	78	CBS	8.18	4.4
5	Round of 32	March 21, 2021, 5:15 ET	(11 MW) Syracuse	75	(3 MW) West Virginia	72	CBS	7.86	4.5
6	Sweet 16	March 27, 2021 5:15 ET	(5 S) Villanova	51	(1 S) Baylor	62	CBS	7.54	4.2
7	Round of 32	March 21, 2021, 2:40 ET	(9 S) Wisconsin	63	(1 S) Baylor	76	CBS	7.42	4.5
8	Elite Eight	March 30, 2021, 9:57 ET	(11 E) UCLA	51	(1 E) Michigan	49	TBS	6.89	3.9
9	Sweet 16	March 28, 2021, 2:10 ET	(5 W) Creighton	65	(1 W) Gonzaga	83	CBS	6.66	3.9
10	Sweet 16	March 28, 2021, 7:15 ET	(11 E) UCLA	88	(2 E) Alabama	78	TBS	6.51	3.7

=== Radio ===
==== First Four ====
- Ted Emrich and Kyle Macy – at Assembly Hall
- John Sadak and Jordan Cornette – at Mackey Arena

==== First and Second Rounds ====
- Ryan Radtke and Austin Croshere – at Hinkle Fieldhouse and Indiana Farmers Coliseum
- Kevin Kugler and P. J. Carlesimo – at Bankers Life Fieldhouse and Lucas Oil Stadium
- Craig Way and Donny Marshall – at Indiana Farmers Coliseum and Hinkle Fieldhouse
- Ted Emrich and Kyle Macy – at Assembly Hall
- John Sadak and Jordan Cornette – at Mackey Arena
- Bill Rosinski and Will Perdue – at Lucas Oil Stadium and Bankers Life Fieldhouse
- Jason Benetti and Robbie Hummel – at Lucas Oil Stadium, Bankers Life Fieldhouse and Hinkle Fieldhouse
- Brandon Gaudin and Dan Dickau – at Hinkle Fieldhouse and Bankers Life Fieldhouse
- Dave Pasch and Danny Manning – at Bankers Life Fieldhouse and Hinkle Fieldhouse
- Scott Graham and Jon Crispin – at Indiana Farmers Coliseum, Lucas Oil Stadium and Bankers Life Fieldhouse

==== Regionals ====
- Ryan Radtke and Donny Marshall – at Bankers Life Fieldhouse (Saturday) and Hinkle Fieldhouse (Sunday)
- Kevin Kugler and P. J. Carlesimo – at Hinkle Fieldhouse (Saturday), Bankers Life Fieldhouse (Sunday) and Lucas Oil Stadium (Monday & Tuesday)
- Ryan Radtke and Robbie Hummel – at Lucas Oil Stadium (Monday & Tuesday)

==== Final Four and National Championship ====
- Kevin Kugler, Jim Jackson, P. J. Carlesimo, and Jim Gray – Lucas Oil Stadium

=== Internet ===
FastBreak is an online-only program providing whiparound coverage of all tournament games similar to NFL RedZone during the first weekend.

- Dave Briggs, Rex Chapman, Tony Delk (New York City)

== See also ==
- 2021 NCAA Division I women's basketball tournament
