= 2020–21 Colgate Raiders men's basketball team =

American college basketball season

2020–21 Colgate Raiders men's basketball

Patriot League North division champions and tournament champions

NCAA tournament, first round
- Conference: Patriot League
- North Division
- Record: 14–2 (11–1 Patriot)
- Head coach: Matt Langel (10th season)
- Assistant coaches: Dave Klatsky; Shawn Trice; Pat Moore
- Home arena: Cotterell Court

2020–21 Patriot League men's basketball standings
| | Conf. | | | | Overall |
| Team | W | | L | PCT | W | | L | PCT |
|---|---|---|---|---|---|---|---|---|
North
| Colgate † | 11 | – | 1 | .917 | 14 | – | 2 | .875 |
| Army | 7 | – | 7 | .500 | 12 | – | 10 | .545 |
| Boston University | 6 | – | 10 | .375 | 7 | – | 11 | .389 |
| Holy Cross | 5 | – | 11 | .313 | 5 | – | 11 | .313 |
Central
| Lafayette | 9 | – | 5 | .643 | 9 | – | 6 | .600 |
| Bucknell | 4 | – | 6 | .400 | 5 | – | 7 | .417 |
| Lehigh | 4 | – | 10 | .286 | 4 | – | 11 | .267 |
South
| Navy | 12 | – | 1 | .923 | 15 | – | 3 | .833 |
| American | 4 | – | 5 | .444 | 4 | – | 6 | .400 |
| Loyola | 4 | – | 10 | .286 | 6 | – | 11 | .353 |
† 2021 Patriot League tournament winner

The 2020–21 Colgate Raiders men's basketball team represented Colgate University in the 2020–21 NCAA Division I men's basketball season. The Raiders, were led by tenth-year head coach Matt Langel, play their home games at Cotterell Court in Hamilton, New York as members of the Patriot League. With the creation of mini-divisions to cut down on travel due to the COVID-19 pandemic, they played in the North Division. They finished the season 14–2, 11–1 in Patriot League Play to finish as champions of the North Division. They defeated Boston University, Bucknell, and Loyola (MD) to be champions of the Patriot League tournament. They received the conference’s automatic bid to the NCAA tournament where they lost in the first round to Arkansas.

== Previous season ==
The Raiders finished the 2019–20 season 25–9, 14–4 in Patriot League play to win the Patriot League regular season championship. They defeated Lehigh and Lafayette to reach the championship game of the Patriot League tournament, where they lost to Boston University. As a regular season league champion who failed to win their league tournament, they received an automatic bid to the 2020 National Invitation Tournament. However, the NIT and all other postseason tournaments were cancelled amid the COVID-19 pandemic.

== Roster ==
2020–21 Colgate Raiders men's basketball team
Players
Coaches

| Pos. | # | Name | Height | Weight | Year | Previous school | Hometown |
|---|---|---|---|---|---|---|---|
| G | 0 | Nelly Cummings | 6 ft 0 in (1.83 m) | 180 lb (82 kg) | Jr | Bowling Green | Midland, Pennsylvania |
| G | 1 | Jordan Burns | 6 ft 0 in (1.83 m) | 175 lb (79 kg) | Sr | Kent School | San Antonio, Texas |
| G | 2 | Zach Light | 6 ft 3 in (1.91 m) | 195 lb (88 kg) | Jr | Northfield Mount Hermon | New York, New York |
| G | 3 | Pearson Parker | 6 ft 1 in (1.85 m) | 185 lb (84 kg) | So | Phillips Exeter | Los Angeles, California |
| G/F | 4 | Ryan Moffatt | 6 ft 6 in (1.98 m) | 220 lb (100 kg) | So | Hempfield High School | Lancaster, Pennsylvania |
| G | 5 | David Maynard | 6 ft 4 in (1.93 m) | 205 lb (93 kg) | Sr | Herriman High School | Herriman, Utah |
| F | 12 | Nicholas Evtimov | 6 ft 7 in (2.01 m) | 215 lb (98 kg) | So | Western Carolina | King, North Carolina |
| G | 13 | Jack Ferguson | 6 ft 3 in (1.91 m) | 180 lb (82 kg) | Sr | Homestead High School | Fort Wayne, Indiana |
| F | 14 | Keegan Records | 6 ft 10 in (2.08 m) | 245 lb (111 kg) | So | St. Andrew's School | South Kingstown, Rhode Island |
| G | 15 | Tucker Richardson | 6 ft 5 in (1.96 m) | 205 lb (93 kg) | Jr | Blair Academy | Flemington, New Jersey |
| F | 22 | Malcolm Bailey | 6 ft 10 in (2.08 m) | 210 lb (95 kg) | So | Ridley College | Stratford, Ontario |
| F | 30 | Sam Thomson | 6 ft 8 in (2.03 m) | 220 lb (100 kg) | Fr | Brooks School | Kitchener–Waterloo, Ontario |
| G | 33 | Oliver Lynch-Daniels | 6 ft 2 in (1.88 m) | 190 lb (86 kg) | Jr | Houston Baptist | Chapel Hill, North Carolina |
| G | 34 | Alex Capitano | 6 ft 4 in (1.93 m) | 195 lb (88 kg) | Fr | Episcopal Academy | Malvern, Pennsylvania |
| F | 35 | Blake Henry | 6 ft 8 in (2.03 m) | 225 lb (102 kg) | Jr | Foothill College | Menlo Park, California |
| C | 55 | Jeff Woodward | 6 ft 11 in (2.11 m) | 265 lb (120 kg) | Fr | Methacton High School | Audubon, Pennsylvania |

Head coach

- Matt Langel (Penn)

Assistant coach(es)

- Dave Klatsky (Penn)
- Shawn Trice (Penn)
- Pat Moore (Colgate)

Legend

- (C) Team captain
- (S) Suspended
- (I) Ineligible
- (W) Walk-on
- Injured
- Current redshirt

Roster
Last update: January 12, 2021

== Schedule and results ==
| Date time, TV | Rank^{#} | Opponent^{#} | Result | Record | Site (attendance) city, state |
Patriot League regular season
| January 2, 2021; 3:00 pm, ESPN+ | | Army | W 101–57 | 1–0 (1–0) | Cotterell Court; Hamilton, NY |
| January 3, 2021; 4:00 pm, ESPN+ | | Army | L 73–75 | 1–1 (1–1) | Cotterell Court; Hamilton, NY |
| January 9, 2021; 6:00 pm, ESPN+ | | at Boston University | W 86–79 | 2–1 (2–1) | Case Gym; Boston, MA |
| January 10, 2021; 6:00 pm, CBSSN | | at Boston University | W 89–45 | 3–1 (3–1) | Case Gym; Boston, MA |
| January 16, 2021; 1:00 pm, ESPN+ | | Holy Cross | W 95-55 | 4–1 (4–1) | Cotterell Court; Hamilton, NY |
| January 17, 2021; 1:00 pm, ESPN+ | | Holy Cross | W 96-87 | 5–1 (5–1) | Cotterell Court; Hamilton, NY |
| January 30, 2021; 2:00 pm, ESPN+ | | at Holy Cross | W 74-63 ^{OT} | 6–1 (6–1) | Hart Center; Worcester, MA |
| January 31, 2021; 5:00 pm, ESPN+ | | at Holy Cross | W 78-60 | 7–1 (7–1) | Hart Center; Worcester, MA |
| February 13, 2021; 4:00 pm, ESPN+ | | at Army | W 95–55 | 8–1 (8–1) | Christl Arena; West Point, NY |
| February 14, 2021; 6:00 pm, ESPN+ | | at Army | W 92–83 | 9–1 (9–1) | Christl Arena; West Point, NY |
| February 20, 2021; 1:00 pm, ESPN+ | | Boston University | W 82–72 | 10–1 (10–1) | Cotterell Court; Hamilton, NY |
| February 21, 2021; 1:00 pm, ESPN+ | | Boston University | W 78–63 | 11–1 (11–1) | Cotterell Court; Hamilton, NY |
Patriot League tournament
| March 6, 2021; 1:00 pm, ESPN+ | (2) | (7) Boston University; Quarterfinals | W 77–69 | 12–1 | Cotterell Court; Hamilton, NY |
| March 10, 2021; 7:30 pm, CBSSN | (2) | (6) Bucknell; Semifinals | W 105–75 | 13–1 | Cotterell Court; Hamilton, NY |
| March 14, 2021; 12:00 pm, CBSSN | (2) | (9) Loyola (MD); Championship | W 85–72 | 14–1 | Cotterell Court; Hamilton, NY |
NCAA tournament
| March 19, 2021; 12:45 pm, truTV | (14 S) | vs. (3 S) No. 10 Arkansas; First Round | L 68–85 | 14–2 | Bankers Life Fieldhouse; Indianapolis, IN |
*Non-conference game. ^{#}Rankings from AP Poll. (#) Tournament seedings in parentheses. All times are in Eastern.
