= 2020–21 American Eagles men's basketball team =

American college basketball season

2020–21 American Eagles men's basketball
- Conference: Patriot League
- South Division
- Record: 4–6 (4–5 Patriot)
- Head coach: Mike Brennan (8th season)
- Assistant coaches: Scott Greenman; Matt Wolff; Eddie Jackson
- Home arena: Bender Arena

2020–21 Patriot League men's basketball standings
	Conf.				Overall
Team	W		L	PCT	W		L	PCT
North
Colgate †	11	–	1	.917	14	–	2	.875
Army	7	–	7	.500	12	–	10	.545
Boston University	6	–	10	.375	7	–	11	.389
Holy Cross	5	–	11	.313	5	–	11	.313
Central
Lafayette	9	–	5	.643	9	–	6	.600
Bucknell	4	–	6	.400	5	–	7	.417
Lehigh	4	–	10	.286	4	–	11	.267
South
Navy	12	–	1	.923	15	–	3	.833
American	4	–	5	.444	4	–	6	.400
Loyola	4	–	10	.286	6	–	11	.353
† 2021 Patriot League tournament winner

The 2020–21 American Eagles men's basketball team represented American University in the 2020–21 NCAA Division I men's basketball season. The Eagles, led by eighth-year head coach Mike Brennan, played their home games at Bender Arena in Washington, D.C. as members of the Patriot League. With the creation of mini-divisions to cut down on travel due to the COVID-19 pandemic, they played in the South Division.

== Previous season ==
The Eagles finished the 2019–20 season 16–14, 12–6 in Patriot League play to finish in a tie for second place. They lost in the quarterfinals of the Patriot League tournament to Bucknell.

== Roster ==
2020–21 American Eagles men's basketball team
Players
Coaches

Pos.	#	Name	Height	Weight	Year	Previous school	Hometown
G	0	Chris Gleaton	6 ft 3 in (1.91 m)	175 lb (79 kg)	Fr	Trinity-Pawling	Thiells, New York
G	1	Victor Brown Jr.	6 ft 4 in (1.93 m)	190 lb (86 kg)	Fr	Lake Highland	Maitland, Florida
G	2	Stacy Beckton Jr.	6 ft 4 in (1.93 m)	186 lb (84 kg)	Sr	Atlantic	Daytona Beach, Florida
G	3	Colin Smalls	6 ft 2 in (1.88 m)	185 lb (84 kg)	Fr	St. Andrew's	Upper Marlboro, Maryland
G	4	Jamir Harris	6 ft 2 in (1.88 m)	198 lb (90 kg)	Sr	Minnesota	North Brunswick, New Jersey
F	5	Connor Nelson	6 ft 6 in (1.98 m)	220 lb (100 kg)	Jr	Central Wyoming College	Denver, Colorado
G	10	Ben Lubarsky	6 ft 5 in (1.96 m)	210 lb (95 kg)	So	The Benjamin School	Palm Beach, Florida
F	12	Christian Lorng	6 ft 9 in (2.06 m)	260 lb (118 kg)	Jr	Chipola College	Paris, France
F	14	Johnny O'Neil	6 ft 9 in (2.06 m)	200 lb (91 kg)	Fr	Chaminade-Madonna	Miami Shores, Florida
F	15	Matt Rogers	6 ft 9 in (2.06 m)	220 lb (100 kg)	Fr	St. Maria Goretti	Knoxville, Maryland
F	21	Josh Alexander	6 ft 8 in (2.03 m)	243 lb (110 kg)	Jr	Iona Prep	Carmel, New York
G	33	Christian Sutton	6 ft 3 in (1.91 m)	193 lb (88 kg)	Jr	Riverwood	Atlanta, Georgia
G	41	Lorenzo Donadio	6 ft 4 in (1.93 m)	190 lb (86 kg)	Fr	Boys' Latin	Rome, Italy
G		Marvin Bragg	6 ft 6 in (1.98 m)	195 lb (88 kg)	Sr	Gahr	Cerritos, California
F		Jesse Little	6 ft 10 in (2.08 m)	204 lb (93 kg)	Sr	Starkville	Starkville, Mississippi

Head coach

- Mike Brennan (Princeton)

Assistant coach(es)

- Scott Greenman (Princeton)
- Matt Wolff (Boston University)
- Eddie Jackson (Ohio State)

Legend

- (C) Team captain
- (S) Suspended
- (I) Ineligible
- (W) Walk-on
- Injured
- Current redshirt

Roster
Last update: December 29, 2020

== Schedule and results ==
Date time, TV	Rank^{#}	Opponent^{#}	Result	Record	Site (attendance) city, state
Patriot League regular season
January 9, 2021; 2:00 pm, ESPN+		at Lehigh			Stabler Arena; Bethlehem, PA
January 10, 2021; 4:00 pm, ESPN+		Lehigh			Bender Arena; Washington, D.C.
January 16, 2021; 12:00 pm, ESPN+		at Navy	L 86–87 ^{OT}	0–1 (0–1)	Alumni Hall (0); Annapolis, MD
January 17, 2021; 4:00 pm, ESPN+		Navy	L 59–71	0–2 (0–2)	Bender Arena (0); Washington, D.C.
January 23, 2021; 12:00 pm, ESPN+		Loyola (MD)	W 71–70	1–2 (1–2)	Bender Arena (0); Washington, D.C.
January 24, 2021; 6:00 pm, ESPN+		at Loyola (MD)	W 81–79 ^{3OT}	2–2 (2–2)	Reitz Arena (0); Baltimore, MD
January 30, 2021; 2:00 pm, ESPN+		Lafayette	Postponed due to COVID-19 issues		Bender Arena; Washington, D.C.
January 31, 2021; 4:00 pm, ESPN+		at Lafayette	Postponed due to COVID-19 issues		Kirby Sports Center; Easton, PA
February 20, 2021; 12:00 pm, ESPN+		Navy	L 60–72	2–3 (2–3)	Bender Arena (0); Washington, D.C.
February 21, 2021; 6:00 pm, ESPN+		Navy	L 60–69	2–4 (2–4)	Bender Arena (0); Washington, D.C.
February 24, 2021; 7:00 pm, ESPN+		at Loyola (MD)	L 49–60	2–3 (2–3)	Reitz Arena (0); Baltimore, MD
February 27, 2021; 2:00 pm, ESPN+		at Bucknell	W 78–71	3–5 (3–5)	Sojka Pavilion (0); Lewisburg, PA
February 28, 2021; 4:00 pm, ESPN+		Bucknell	W 81–68	4–5 (4–5)	Bender Arena (0); Washington, D.C.
Patriot League tournament
March 6, 2021; 3:00 pm, ESPN+	(5)	at (4) Army; Quarterfinals	L 66–89	4–6	Christl Arena; West Point, NY
*Non-conference game. ^{#}Rankings from AP Poll. (#) Tournament seedings in parentheses. All times are in Eastern.
