= 2020–21 Holy Cross Crusaders men's basketball team =

American college basketball season

2020–21 Holy Cross Crusaders men's basketball
- Conference: Patriot League
- North Division
- Record: 5–11 (5–11 Patriot)
- Head coach: Brett Nelson (2nd season)
- Assistant coaches: R.J. Evans; Sam Ferry; Joe Kennedy
- Home arena: Hart Center

2020–21 Patriot League men's basketball standings
	Conf.				Overall
Team	W		L	PCT	W		L	PCT
North
Colgate †	11	–	1	.917	14	–	2	.875
Army	7	–	7	.500	12	–	10	.545
Boston University	6	–	10	.375	7	–	11	.389
Holy Cross	5	–	11	.313	5	–	11	.313
Central
Lafayette	9	–	5	.643	9	–	6	.600
Bucknell	4	–	6	.400	5	–	7	.417
Lehigh	4	–	10	.286	4	–	11	.267
South
Navy	12	–	1	.923	15	–	3	.833
American	4	–	5	.444	4	–	6	.400
Loyola	4	–	10	.286	6	–	11	.353
† 2021 Patriot League tournament winner

The 2020–21 Holy Cross Crusaders men's basketball team represented the College of the Holy Cross in the 2020–21 NCAA Division I men's basketball season. The Crusaders, led by second-year head coach Brett Nelson, played their home games at the Hart Center in Worcester, Massachusetts as members of the Patriot League. With the creation of mini-divisions to cut down on travel due to the COVID-19 pandemic, they played in the North Division.

The Crusaders finished the season with a 5–11 record in Patriot League play to finish in last place in the North Division and eighth overall in the conference. On March 2, 2021, they suspended their season after another positive COVID-19 test within the program and did not play in the Patriot League tournament.

== Previous season ==
The Crusaders finished the 2019–20 season 3–29, 2–16 in Patriot League play, to finish in the last place. They lost in the first round of the Patriot League tournament to Bucknell.

== Roster ==
2020–21 Holy Cross Crusaders men's basketball team
Players
Coaches

Pos.	#	Name	Height	Weight	Year	Previous school	Hometown
G	0	Ryan Wade	6 ft 2 in (1.88 m)	185 lb (84 kg)	So	Skyline High School	Ann Arbor, MI
G	1	R.J. Johnson	6 ft 1 in (1.85 m)	175 lb (79 kg)	Fr	Charlotte Latin School	Matthews, NC
G	2	Bo Montgomery	6 ft 5 in (1.96 m)	180 lb (82 kg)	Fr	Lausanne Collegiate School	Memphis, TN
G	3	DáJion Humphrey	6 ft 4 in (1.93 m)	175 lb (79 kg)	Fr	Southfield Christian School	Detroit, MI
G	4	Austin Butler	6 ft 5 in (1.96 m)	212 lb (96 kg)	Sr	Greater Latrobe Senior High School	Latrobe, PA
F	10	Gerrale Gates	6 ft 6 in (1.98 m)	230 lb (104 kg)	Jr	David W. Butler High School	Charlotte, NC
G	11	Joey Reilly	6 ft 0 in (1.83 m)	170 lb (77 kg)	So	East Catholic High School	Cromwell, CT
G	12	Malcolm Townsel	6 ft 5 in (1.96 m)	205 lb (93 kg)	Jr	State Fair Community College	Chicago, IL
F	15	Matt Faw	6 ft 9 in (2.06 m)	223 lb (101 kg)	Sr	Upper Merion Area High School	King of Prussia, PA
F	24	D.J. Hart	6 ft 5 in (1.96 m)	232 lb (105 kg)	Jr	St. Benedict's Prep	Newark, NJ
F	32	Michael Rabinovich	6 ft 10 in (2.08 m)	220 lb (100 kg)	Fr	Worcester Academy	Hopkinton, MA
G/F	33	Judson Martindale	6 ft 6 in (1.98 m)	205 lb (93 kg)	Fr	Worcester Academy	Sudbury, MA
F	44	Louth-M Coulibaly	6 ft 8 in (2.03 m)	220 lb (100 kg)	Fr	Canada Topflight Academy	Ottawa, ON

Head coach

- Brett Nelson (Florida)

Assistant coach(es)

- R.J. Evans (Connecticut)
- Sam Ferry (Vanderbilt)
- Joe Kennedy (Northwestern)

Legend

- (C) Team captain
- (S) Suspended
- (I) Ineligible
- (W) Walk-on
- Injured
- Current redshirt

Roster
Last update: January 29, 2021

== Schedule and results ==
Date time, TV	Rank^{#}	Opponent^{#}	Result	Record	Site (attendance) city, state
Patriot League regular season
January 4, 2021; 2:00 p.m., ESPN+		Boston University	L 76–83	0–1 (0–1)	Hart Center; Worcester, MA
January 5, 2021; 2:00 p.m., ESPN+		at Boston University	W 68–66	1–1 (1–1)	Case Gym; Boston, MA
January 9, 2021; 3:00 p.m., ESPN+		Army	L 68–83	1–2 (1–2)	Hart Center; Worcester, MA
January 10, 2021; 3:00 p.m., ESPN+		at Army	W 70–61	2–2 (2–2)	Christl Arena; West Point, NY
January 16, 2021; 1:00 p.m., ESPN+		at Colgate	L 55–95	2–3 (2–3)	Cotterell Court; Hamilton, NY
January 17, 2021; 1:00 p.m., ESPN+		at Colgate	L 87–96	2–4 (2–4)	Cottrell Court; Hamilton, NY
January 23, 2021; 2:00 p.m., ESPN+		Lehigh	L 72–75	2–5 (2–5)	Hart Center; Worcester, MA
January 24, 2021; 2:00 p.m., ESPN+		Lehigh	L 74–82	2–6 (2–6)	Hart Center; Worcester, MA
January 30, 2021; 2:00 p.m., ESPN+		Colgate	L 63–74	2–7 (2–7)	Hart Center; Worcester, MA
January 31, 2021; 5:00 p.m., CBSSN		Colgate	L 60–78	2–8 (2–8)	Hart Center; Worcester, MA
February 13, 2021; 2:00 p.m., ESPN+		Boston University	W 82–65	3–8 (3–8)	Hart Center; Worcester, MA
February 14, 2021; 5:00 p.m., ESPN+		at Boston University	L 68–86	3–9 (3–9)	Case Gym; Boston, MA
February 17, 2021; 5:00 p.m., ESPN+		Boston University	L 69–78	3–10 (3–10)	Hart Center; Worcester, MA
February 20, 2021; 3:00 p.m., ESPN+		at Army	L 65–69	3–11 (3–11)	Christl Arena (45); West Point, NY
February 21, 2021; 3:00 p.m., ESPN+		Army	W 67–51	4–11 (4–11)	Hart Center; Worcester, MA
February 24, 2021; 7:00 p.m., ESPN+		at Boston University	W 86–75	5–11 (5–11)	Case Gym; Boston, MA
Patriot League tournament
March 3, 2021; 6:00 p.m., ESPN+	(8)	(9) Loyola (MD); First round	Forfeit		Hart Center; Worcester, MA
*Non-conference game. ^{#}Rankings from AP poll. (#) Tournament seedings in parentheses. All times are in Eastern.
