= Jordan Burns =

American basketball player (born 1997)

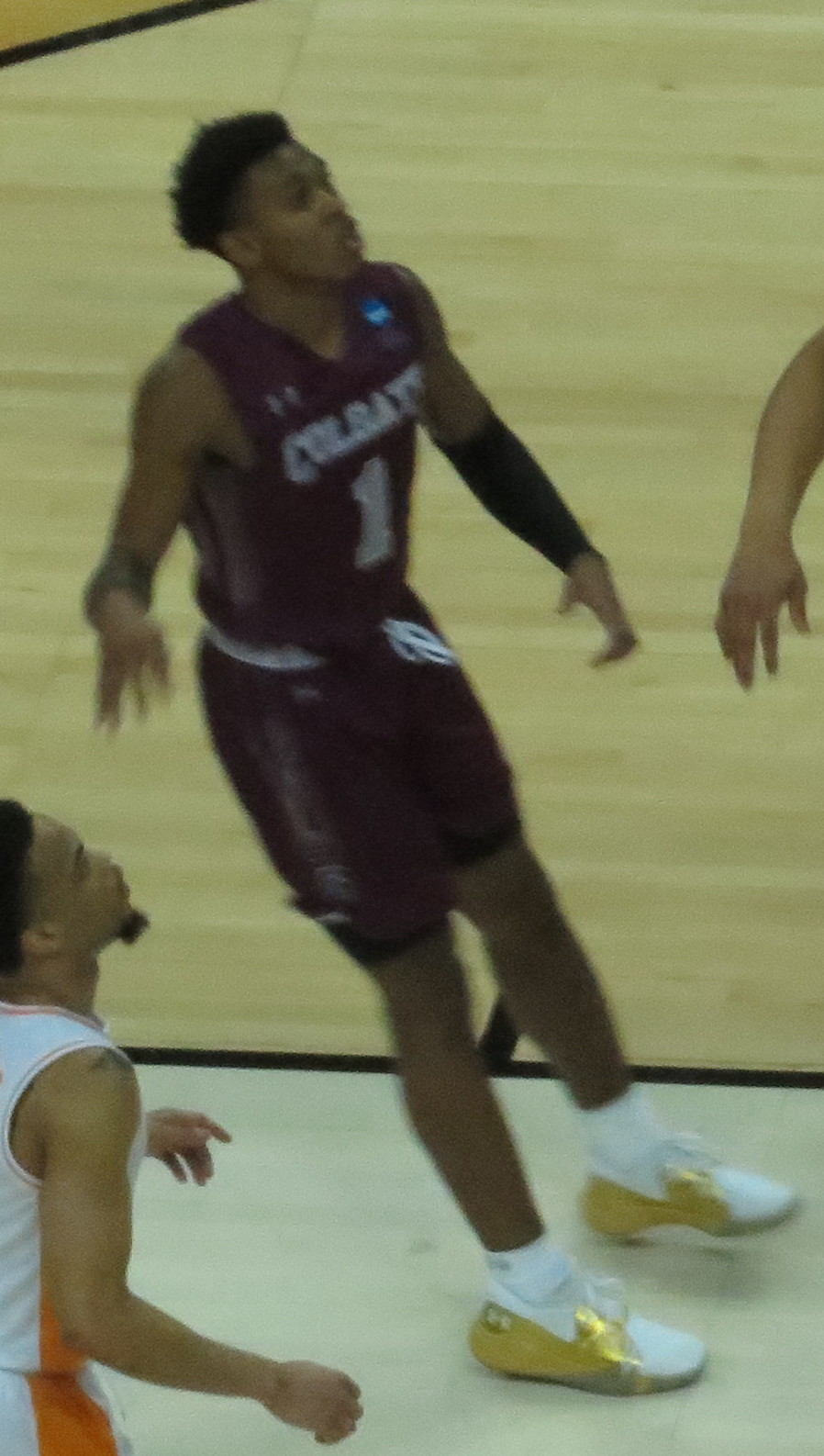
- Burns with Colgate in 2019

Free agent
- Position: Point guard

Personal information
- Born: August 28, 1997 (age 29) Jackson, Tennessee, U.S.
- Listed height: 6 ft 0 in (1.83 m)
- Listed weight: 175 lb (79 kg)

Career information
- High school: John Marshall (San Antonio, Texas); Kent School (Kent, Connecticut)
- College: Colgate (2017–2021)
- NBA draft: 2021: undrafted
- Playing career: 2021–present

Career history
- 2021–2022: Austin Spurs
- 2022: Maine Celtics
- 2022: Beroe
- 2022: London Lightning
- 2022: Twarde Pierniki Toruń
- 2022–2023: Caledonia Gladiators
- 2023: London Lightning
- 2023: Santos del Potosí
- 2023: Lusitânia EXPERT
- 2024: Piratas de Los Lagos
- 2024–2025: KW Titans
- 2025: Tijuana Zonkeys

Career highlights
- Patriot League Player of the Year (2021); 2× First-team All-Patriot League (2020, 2021); Second-team All-Patriot League (2019); Patriot League All-Rookie Team (2018); 2× Patriot League tournament MVP (2019, 2021)
- Stats at NBA.com
- Stats at Basketball Reference

Jordan Kennedy Burns (born August 28, 1997) is an American professional basketball player who last played for the Tijuana Zonkeys of the CIBACOPA. He played college basketball for the Colgate Raiders.

== High school career ==
Burns was a four-year basketball captain for John Marshall High School in San Antonio, Texas. Entering his freshman season, he stood 5 feet 7 inches (1.70 m) and weighed 110 pounds (50 kg). Burns earned All-District honors in each season. As a senior, he led his team to the Conference 6A Region IV playoffs for its first time in 20 years and was named to the All-Region team. After initially committing to NCAA Division II program Midwestern State, he switched his commitment to Colgate, his only NCAA Division I offer. To meet Colgate's academic requirements, Burns attended Kent School in Kent, Connecticut, for a prep year. He averaged 19 points, five rebounds and four assists per game, leading Kent to the Founders League title while sharing league most valuable player (MVP) honors.

== College career ==
On November 19, 2017, in his third game for Colgate, Burns scored 26 points and shot 12-of-15 from the field in a 93–88 win over UMBC. He was subsequently named Patriot League Rookie of the Week. On January 27, he scored a freshman season-high 27 points in an 83–69 victory over American. Burns subsequently earned Patriot League Rookie of the Week honors for a third time. As a freshman, he averaged 11.9 points, 2.9 assists and 2.7 rebounds per game, making the Patriot League All-Rookie Team.

In the second game as a sophomore, on November 9, 2018, Burns recorded 30 points, six assists and five rebounds in an 87–74 win over Monmouth. Four days later, he was named Patriot League Player of the Week. On March 13, 2019, Burns scored a sophomore season-high 35 points to go with six assists and three steals, leading his team to a 94–80 victory over Bucknell in the 2019 Patriot League tournament final. He was named tournament MVP and helped Colgate earn its first NCAA tournament berth since 1996. In the first round of the 2019 NCAA tournament, Burns scored 32 points and made a career-high eight three-pointers in a 77–70 loss to second-seeded Tennessee. As a sophomore, he averaged 16.3 points, 5.7 assists and three rebounds per game and was named to the second team All-Patriot League.

On November 26, 2019, in his junior season, Burns scored a career-high 40 points and made eight three-pointers in a 99–81 win over Green Bay at the Legends Classic and was named tournament MVP. He recorded the most single-game points by a Colgate player since Tucker Neale in 1995 and surpassed the tournament scoring record. The performance helped him win Patriot League Player of the Week and Lou Henson National Player of the Week recognition on December 2. Burns recorded 21 points and 10 assists in a December 22 victory over Columbia, 89–71, before being named Patriot League Player of the Week again. As a junior, he averaged 15.8 points, 4.5 assists, 3.2 rebounds and 1.7 steals per game, earning first-team All-Patriot League honors. Following the season, he declared for the 2020 NBA draft. Burns ultimately withdrew from the draft and returned to Colgate.

Burns averaged 16.8 points, 4.3 rebounds and 5.3 assists per game as a senior. He helped lead the Raiders to an NCAA tournament appearance. Burns was named Patriot League Player of the Year as well as collecting first-team All-Patriot League honors. He declared for the 2021 NBA draft instead of using the additional year of eligibility the NCAA granted due to the COVID-19 pandemic.

== Professional career ==
=== Austin Spurs (2021–2022) ===
After going undrafted in the 2021 NBA draft, Burns signed with the San Antonio Spurs on October 11, 2021. However, he was waived three days later. On October 27, he signed with the Austin Spurs as an affiliate player. Burns was then later waived on January 12, 2022.

=== Maine Celtics (2022) ===
On January 15, 2022, Burns was acquired via available player pool by the Maine Celtics. He was then later waived on January 23, 2022.

=== BC Beroe Stara Zagora (2022) ===
On February 15, 2022, Burns signed with BC Beroe of the NBL.

=== London Lightning (2022 & 2023) ===
In 2022, Burns signed with the London Lightning where he played in 10 games. He averaged 17.1 points per game, 3.8 assists per game and 3.4 rebounds per game.

In 2023, Burns resigned with the London Lightning where he played in 21 games. He averaged 20.8 points per game, 8.6 assists per game, and 4.4 rebounds per game.

=== Twarde Pierniki Toruń (2022) ===
On July 22, 2022, he has signed with Twarde Pierniki Toruń of the Polish Basketball League (PLK).

=== Caledonia Gladiators (2022) ===
On November 19, 2022, he signed with Caledonia Gladiators of the British Basketball League (BBL).

=== SC Lusitania Expert (2023) ===
On November 17, 2023, Burns signed with SC Luisitania of the Liga Portuguesa de Basquetebol. He played in 1 game and left in December 2023.

=== Piratas de Los Lagos (2024) ===
On May 15, 2024, Burns signed with Piratas de Los Lagos of Liga Baquet Pro.

== Career statistics ==
Legend
GP	Games played	GS	Games started	MPG	Minutes per game
FG%	Field goal percentage	3P%	3-point field goal percentage	FT%	Free throw percentage
RPG	Rebounds per game	APG	Assists per game	SPG	Steals per game
BPG	Blocks per game	PPG	Points per game	**Bold**	Career high

=== College ===
Year	Team	GP	GS	MPG	FG%	3P%	FT%	RPG	APG	SPG	BPG	PPG
2017–18	Colgate	31	19	27.3	.431	.365	.763	2.6	3.0	.8	.1	11.9
2018–19	Colgate	30	30	**32.9**	**.438**	.394	.821	3.0	**5.7**	1.2	.1	16.3
2019–20	Colgate	**34**	**34**	32.4	.404	.359	.785	3.1	4.5	**1.7**	.1	15.8
2020–21	Colgate	16	16	29.3	.402	**.423**	**.899**	**4.3**	5.3	1.6	**.2**	**16.8**
Career		111	99	30.7	.419	.378	.813	3.1	4.5	1.3	.1	15.0

== Personal life ==
Burns is the son of Eroy and Arenda Burns. Burns's older brother, Jaylon Myers, played football at John Marshall High School and in college. His younger brother, Joshua, also played football for John Marshall and UIW despite suffering from aphasia.

Burns welcomed a son, Jordan Kennedy Burns II on July 30, 2021. On July 18, 2024, his son died.
