= 2020–21 Navy Midshipmen men's basketball team =

American college basketball season

2020–21 Navy Midshipmen men's basketball

Patriot League South division champions
- Conference: Patriot League
- Record: 15–3 (12–1 Patriot)
- Head coach: Ed DeChellis (10th season)
- Assistant coaches: Emmett Davis; Drew Gibson; Jon Perry; Adam Notteboom
- Home arena: Alumni Hall

2020–21 Patriot League men's basketball standings
	Conf.				Overall
Team	W		L	PCT	W		L	PCT
North
Colgate †	11	–	1	.917	14	–	2	.875
Army	7	–	7	.500	12	–	10	.545
Boston University	6	–	10	.375	7	–	11	.389
Holy Cross	5	–	11	.313	5	–	11	.313
Central
Lafayette	9	–	5	.643	9	–	6	.600
Bucknell	4	–	6	.400	5	–	7	.417
Lehigh	4	–	10	.286	4	–	11	.267
South
Navy	12	–	1	.923	15	–	3	.833
American	4	–	5	.444	4	–	6	.400
Loyola	4	–	10	.286	6	–	11	.353
† 2021 Patriot League tournament winner

The 2020–21 Navy Midshipmen men's basketball team represented the United States Naval Academy during the 2020–21 NCAA Division I men's basketball season. The team was led by tenth-year head coach Ed DeChellis, and played their home games at Alumni Hall in Annapolis, Maryland as a member of the Patriot League (South division). The Midshipmen finished the season 15–3, 12–1 in Patriot League play, to finish in first place.

== Previous season ==
The Midshipmen finished the 2019–20 season 14–16, 8–10 in Patriot League play, to finish in a tie for sixth place. They lost in the first round of the Patriot League tournament to Boston University.

== Roster ==
2020–21 Navy Midshipmen men's basketball team
Players
Coaches

Pos.	#	Name	Height	Weight	Year	Previous school	Hometown
G	0	Austin Inge	6 ft 0 in (1.83 m)	186 lb (84 kg)	Fr	Greensboro Day School	Greensboro, NC
G	1	John Carter Jr.	6 ft 3 in (1.91 m)	195 lb (88 kg)	Jr	Summit High School	Spring Hill, TN
G	3	Sean Yoder	6 ft 2 in (1.88 m)	195 lb (88 kg)	So	Pennridge High School	Dublin, PA
F	5	Tyler Nelson	6 ft 6 in (1.98 m)	214 lb (97 kg)	So	Metrolina Christian Academy	Monroe, NC
G	10	Christian Jones	6 ft 1 in (1.85 m)	188 lb (85 kg)	So	Annapolis High School	Bowie, MD
F	11	Jaylen Walker	6 ft 5 in (1.96 m)	218 lb (99 kg)	So	Allen High School	Allen, TX
G	12	Trae Broadnax	6 ft 3 in (1.91 m)	195 lb (88 kg)	Fr	Montverde Academy	Savannah, GA
G	15	P.J. Roach Jr.	6 ft 2 in (1.88 m)	175 lb (79 kg)	So	Atlantic Shores Christian School	Virginia Beach, VA
G	20	Greg Summers	6 ft 4 in (1.93 m)	200 lb (91 kg)	Jr	The First Academy	Ocoee, FL
G	21	Patrick Dorsey	6 ft 5 in (1.96 m)	208 lb (94 kg)	So	Millbrook High School	Raleigh, NC
G	22	Cam Davis	6 ft 0 in (1.83 m)	183 lb (83 kg)	Sr	Kickapoo High School	Battlefield, MO
F	23	B.J. Knight	6 ft 5 in (1.96 m)	220 lb (100 kg)	Fr	Peachtree Ridge High School	Suwanee, GA
F	24	P.J. Fenton	6 ft 7 in (2.01 m)	212 lb (96 kg)	So	Green Hope High School	Cary, NC
F	25	Alec Loehr	6 ft 7 in (2.01 m)	225 lb (102 kg)	Sr	Rosemount High School	Inver Grove Heights, MN
G	30	Christian Silva	6 ft 2 in (1.88 m)	197 lb (89 kg)	Jr	Archbishop Carroll High School	Miami, FL
F	31	Daniel Deaver	6 ft 8 in (2.03 m)	225 lb (102 kg)	So	Marshall High School	Falls Church, VA
G	32	Charles West	6 ft 3 in (1.91 m)	195 lb (88 kg)	Fr	Spanish River High School	Delray Beach, FL
F	33	Luke Loehr	6 ft 7 in (2.01 m)	225 lb (102 kg)	Sr	Rosemount High School	Inver Grove Heights, MN
F	35	Nate Allison	6 ft 6 in (1.98 m)	223 lb (101 kg)	So	Starr's Mill High School	Fayetteville, GA
G	40	Aaron Davis	6 ft 3 in (1.91 m)	215 lb (98 kg)	Fr	Klein High School	Spring, TX
F	41	Tony Atkinson	6 ft 7 in (2.01 m)	235 lb (107 kg)	Fr	Westminster Academy	Palm Beach Gardens, FL
C	44	Ejai Washington	6 ft 7 in (2.01 m)	220 lb (100 kg)	Fr	Lanier High School	Buford, GA
F	55	Richard Njoku	6 ft 7 in (2.01 m)	230 lb (104 kg)	Jr	St. John's College High School	Washington, D.C.

Head coach

- Ed DeChellis (Penn State)

Assistant coach(es)

- Emmett Davis (St. Lawrence)
- Drew Gibson (Wofford)
- Adam Notteboom (Xavier)
- Jon Perry (East Tennessee State)

Legend

- (C) Team captain
- (S) Suspended
- (I) Ineligible
- (W) Walk-on
- Injured
- Current redshirt

Roster
Last update: December 3, 2020

== Schedule and results ==
Date time, TV	Rank^{#}	Opponent^{#}	Result	Record	Site (attendance) city, state
Regular season
November 25, 2020*; 12:00 pm, CBSSN		George Washington	W 78–71	1–0	Alumni Hall (87); Annapolis, MD
November 27, 2020*; 3:00 pm, BTN		at Maryland	L 52–82	1–1	Xfinity Center; College Park, MD
November 28, 2020*; 3:00 pm		vs. Mount St. Mary's	W 73–67	2–1	Xfinity Center; College Park, MD
December 1, 2020*; 6:00 pm, CBSSN		at Georgetown	W 78–71	3–1	McDonough Gymnasium; Washington, D.C.
December 16, 2020*; 6:00 pm, ESPN+		Morgan State	Canceled		Alumni Hall; Annapolis, MD
December 21, 2020*; 6:00 pm, ESPN+		Delaware	Canceled		Alumni Hall; Annapolis, MD
January 2, 2021; 2:00 pm, ESPN+		Bucknell	W 78–69	4–1 (1–0)	Alumni Hall; Annapolis, MD
January 3, 2021; 6:00 pm, CBSSN		at Bucknell	W 63–60	5–1 (2–0)	Sojka Pavilion; Lewisburg, PA
January 9, 2021; 1:00 pm, ESPN+		at Loyola	Postponed		Reitz Arena; Baltimore, MD
January 9, 2021; 2:00 pm, ESPN+		at Lehigh	W 69–61	6–1 (3–0)	Stabler Arena; Bethlehem, PA
January 10, 2021; 2:00 pm, ESPN+		Loyola	Postponed		Alumni Hall; Annapolis, MD
January 10, 2021; 3:00 pm, ESPN+		Lehigh	W 73–58	7–1 (4–0)	Alumni Hall; Annapolis, MD
January 16, 2021; 12:00 pm, ESPN+		American	W 87–86 ^{OT}	8–1 (5–0)	Alumni Hall; Annapolis, MD
January 17, 2021; 12:00 pm, ESPN+		American	W 71–59	9–1 (6–0)	Alumni Hall; Annapolis, MD
January 23, 2021; 2:30 pm, CBSSN		Army	W 69–62	10–1 (7–0)	Alumni Hall (250); Annapolis, MD
January 24, 2021; 3:00 pm, ESPN+		Army	L 78–87 ^{OT}	10–2 (7–1)	Alumni Hall (150); Annapolis, MD
January 30, 2021; 12:00 pm, ESPN+		Loyola	W 70–52	11–2 (8–1)	Alumni Hall; Annapolis, MD
January 31, 2021; 6:00 pm, ESPN+		at Loyola	Postponed		Reitz Arena; Baltimore, MD
February 6, 2021; 12:00 pm, ESPN+		at American	Postponed		Bender Arena; Washington, D.C.
February 7, 2021; 3:00 pm, ESPN+		at American	Postponed		Bender Arena; Washington, D.C.
February 13, 2021; 1:00 pm, ESPN+		Lafayette	Postponed		Alumni Hall; Annapolis, MD
February 14, 2021; 4:00 pm, ESPN+		at Lafayette	Postponed		Kirby Sports Center; Easton, PA
February 20, 2021; CBSSN		at Army	Cancelled		Christl Arena; West Point, NY
February 20, 2021; 12:00 p.m., ESPN+		at American	W 72–60	12–2 (9–1)	Bender Arena; Washington, D.C.
February 21, 2021; 3:00 p.m., ESPN+		at Army	Cancelled		Christl Arena; West Point, NY
February 21, 2021; 6:00 p.m., CBSSN		at American	W 69–60	13–2 (10–1)	Bender Arena; Washington, D.C.
February 27, 2021; 12:00 p.m., ESPN+		at Loyola	W 73–67	14–2 (11–1)	Reitz Arena; Baltimore, MD
February 28, 2021; 4:00 p.m., ESPN+		Loyola	W 66–58	15–2 (12–1)	Alumni Hall; Annapolis, MD
Patriot League tournament
March 6, 2021; 12:00 pm, ESPN+	(1)	(9) Loyola; Quarterfinals	L 68–76	15–3	Alumni Hall; Annapolis, MD
*Non-conference game. ^{#}Rankings from AP poll. (#) Tournament seedings in parentheses. All times are in Eastern Time.
