= 2020–21 Loyola Greyhounds men's basketball team =

American college basketball season

2020–21 Loyola Greyhounds men's basketball
- Conference: Patriot League
- South Division
- Record: 6–11 (4–10 Patriot)
- Head coach: Tavaras Hardy (3rd season)
- Assistant coaches: Ivo Simović; Taj Finger; Corin 'Tiny' Adams
- Home arena: Reitz Arena

2020–21 Patriot League men's basketball standings
	Conf.				Overall
Team	W		L	PCT	W		L	PCT
North
Colgate †	11	–	1	.917	14	–	2	.875
Army	7	–	7	.500	12	–	10	.545
Boston University	6	–	10	.375	7	–	11	.389
Holy Cross	5	–	11	.313	5	–	11	.313
Central
Lafayette	9	–	5	.643	9	–	6	.600
Bucknell	4	–	6	.400	5	–	7	.417
Lehigh	4	–	10	.286	4	–	11	.267
South
Navy	12	–	1	.923	15	–	3	.833
American	4	–	5	.444	4	–	6	.400
Loyola	4	–	10	.286	6	–	11	.353
† 2021 Patriot League tournament winner

The 2020–21 Loyola Greyhounds men's basketball team represented Loyola University Maryland in the 2020–21 NCAA Division I men's basketball season. The Greyhounds, led by third-year head coach Tavaras Hardy, played their home games at Reitz Arena in Baltimore, Maryland as members of the Patriot League. With the creation of mini-divisions to cut down on travel due to the ongoing COVID-19 pandemic, they played in the South Division. They finished the season 6–11, 4–10 in Patriot League play to finish in last place in the South Division. In the Patriot League tournament, they advanced to the quarterfinals when Holy Cross was forced to forfeit due to COVID-19 issues. In the quarterfinals, they defeated Navy to advance to the semifinals where they defeated Army. In the championship game, they lost to Colgate.

== Previous season ==
The Greyhounds finished the 2019–20 season 15–17, 7–11 in Patriot League play to finish in a tie for eighth place. They lost in the first round of the Patriot League tournament to Lehigh.

== Roster ==
2020–21 Loyola Greyhounds men's basketball team
Players
Coaches

Pos.	#	Name	Height	Weight	Year	Previous school	Hometown
G	1	Wade Jackson	6 ft 3 in (1.91 m)	183 lb (83 kg)	Fr	St. Vincent Pallotti HS	Columbia, Maryland
G	2	Jaylin Andrews	6 ft 4 in (1.93 m)	186 lb (84 kg)	Jr	Boys' Latin School of Maryland	Owings Mills, Maryland
G	3	Luke Johnson	6 ft 3 in (1.91 m)	180 lb (82 kg)	Sr	Lexington Catholic HS	Lexington, Kentucky
G	4	Isaiah Hart	5 ft 11 in (1.8 m)	185 lb (84 kg)	Sr	Whitefield Academy	Morrow, Georgia
G	5	Garren Davis	6 ft 4 in (1.93 m)	200 lb (91 kg)	So	The Colony HS	Dallas, Texas
F	10	Golden Dike	6 ft 10 in (2.08 m)	257 lb (117 kg)	So	Colegio SEK El Castillo International School	Málaga, Spain
G	11	Brandon Bradsher	5 ft 10 in (1.78 m)	185 lb (84 kg)	Sr	Boys' Latin School of Maryland	Ellicott City, Maryland
G	12	Cam Spencer	6 ft 4 in (1.93 m)	207 lb (94 kg)	So	Boys' Latin School of Maryland	Davidsonville, Maryland
F	13	Markese Redding	6 ft 6 in (1.98 m)	201 lb (91 kg)	Jr	LREI	Brooklyn, New York
F	14	Alonso Faure	6 ft 10 in (2.08 m)	221 lb (100 kg)	Fr	IES Fuente San Luis	Busot, Spain
G	21	Ethan Norton	6 ft 4 in (1.93 m)	162 lb (73 kg)	Sr	The Hill School	Collegeville, Pennsylvania
F	22	Casmir Ochiaka	6 ft 8 in (2.03 m)	235 lb (107 kg)	Jr	St. Mary of the Assumption HS	Enugu, Nigeria
F	23	Brent Holcombe	6 ft 8 in (2.03 m)	211 lb (96 kg)	Sr	Coral Reef HS	Miami, Florida
G	24	Daraun Gray	5 ft 11 in (1.8 m)	177 lb (80 kg)	So	Landon School	Clarksburg, Maryland
G	25	Kenneth Jones	6 ft 0 in (1.83 m)	187 lb (85 kg)	Jr	Mater Dei Prep	Hillside, New Jersey
F	34	Santi Aldama	6 ft 11 in (2.11 m)	224 lb (102 kg)	So	Canterbury Academy	Las Palmas de Gran Canaria, Spain

Head coach

- Tavaras Hardy (Northwestern)

Assistant coach(es)

- Ivo Simović (Union (Serbia))
- Taj Finger (Stanford)
- Corin 'Tiny' Adams (Morgan State)

Legend

- (C) Team captain
- (S) Suspended
- (I) Ineligible
- (W) Walk-on
- Injured
- Current redshirt

Roster
Last update: January 3, 2021

== Schedule and results ==
Date time, TV	Rank^{#}	Opponent^{#}	Result	Record	Site (attendance) city, state
Patriot League regular season
January 2, 2021; 1:00 pm, ESPN+		American	Postponed		Reitz Arena; Baltimore, MD
January 3, 2021; 4:00 pm, ESPN+		at American	Postponed		Bender Arena; Washington, D.C.
January 9, 2021; 1:00 pm, ESPN+		Navy	Postponed		Reitz Arena; Baltimore, MD
January 10, 2021; 3:00 pm, ESPN+		at Navy	Postponed		Alumni Hall; Annapolis, MD
January 16, 2021; 4:00 pm, ESPN+		at Lafayette	L 75–77	0–1 (0–1)	Kirby Sports Center (0); Easton, PA
January 17, 2021; 6:00 pm, CBSSN		Lafayette	L 70–72	0–2 (0–2)	Reitz Arena (0); Baltimore, MD
January 23, 2021; 12:00 pm, ESPN+		at American	L 70–71	0–3 (0–3)	Bender Arena (0); Washington, D.C.
January 24, 2021; 6:00 pm, ESPN+		American	L 79–81 ^{3OT}	0–4 (0–4)	Reitz Arena (0); Baltimore, MD
January 30, 2021; 12:00 pm, ESPN+		at Navy	L 52–70	0–5 (0–5)	Alumni Hall (0); Annapolis, MD
January 31, 2021; 6:00 pm, ESPN+		Navy	Postponed		Reitz Arena; Baltimore, MD
February 6, 2021; 2:00 pm, ESPN+		Bucknell	Postponed		Reitz Arena; Baltimore, MD
February 7, 2021; 2:00 pm, ESPN+		Lafayette	W 75–62	1–5 (1–5)	Reitz Arena (0); Baltimore, MD
February 8, 2021; 7:00 pm, CBSSN		Bucknell	Postponed		Sojka Pavilion; Lewisburg, PA
February 8, 2021; 7:00 pm, CBSSN		at Lafayette	L 76–80	1–6 (1–6)	Kirby Sports Center (0); Easton, PA
February 13, 2021; 2:00 pm, ESPN+		at Lafayette	L 94–97 ^{3OT}	1–7 (1–7)	Kirby Sports Center (0); Easton, PA
February 14, 2021; 5:00 pm, ESPN+		Lafayette	W 88–69	2–7 (2–7)	Reitz Arena (0); Baltimore, MD
February 20, 2021; 1:00 pm, ESPN+		at Lehigh	W 75–47	3–7 (3–7)	Stabler Arena; Bethlehem, PA
February 21, 2021; 6:00 pm, ESPN+		Lehigh	L 72–76	3–8 (3–8)	Reitz Arena; Baltimore, MD
February 24, 2021; 7:00 pm, ESPN+		American	W 60–49	4–8 (4–8)	Reitz Arena; Baltimore, MD
February 27, 2021; 12:00 pm, ESPN+		Navy	L 67–73	4–9 (4–9)	Reitz Arena; Baltimore, MD
February 28, 2021; 4:00 pm, ESPN+		at Navy	L 58–66	4–10 (4–10)	Alumni Hall; Annapolis, MD
Patriot League tournament
March 3, 2021; 6:00 pm, ESPN+	(9)	at (8) Holy Cross; First round	Won by forfeit due to COVID-19 issues at Holy Cross		Hart Center; Worcester, MA
March 6, 2021; 12:00 pm, ESPN+	(9)	at (1) Navy; Quarterfinals	W 76–68	5–10	Alumni Hall; Annapolis, MD
March 10, 2021; 5:30 pm, CBSSN	(9)	at (4) Army; Semifinals	W 67–63	6–10	Christl Arena; West Point, NY
March 14, 2021; 12:00 pm, CBSSN	(9)	at (2) Colgate; Championship	L 72–85	6–11	Cotterell Court; Hamilton, NY
*Non-conference game. ^{#}Rankings from AP Poll. (#) Tournament seedings in parentheses. All times are in Eastern.
