= 2020–21 Lehigh Mountain Hawks men's basketball team =

American college basketball season

2020–21 Lehigh Mountain Hawks men's basketball
- Conference: Patriot League
- Central Division
- Record: 4–11 (4–10 Patriot)
- Head coach: Brett Reed (14th season)
- Assistant coaches: Harry Morra; Noel Hightower; Quinn McDowell
- Home arena: Stabler Arena

2020–21 Patriot League men's basketball standings
	Conf.				Overall
Team	W		L	PCT	W		L	PCT
North
Colgate †	11	–	1	.917	14	–	2	.875
Army	7	–	7	.500	12	–	10	.545
Boston University	6	–	10	.375	7	–	11	.389
Holy Cross	5	–	11	.313	5	–	11	.313
Central
Lafayette	9	–	5	.643	9	–	6	.600
Bucknell	4	–	6	.400	5	–	7	.417
Lehigh	4	–	10	.286	4	–	11	.267
South
Navy	12	–	1	.923	15	–	3	.833
American	4	–	5	.444	4	–	6	.400
Loyola	4	–	10	.286	6	–	11	.353
† 2021 Patriot League tournament winner

The 2020–21 Lehigh Mountain Hawks men's basketball team represented Lehigh University in the 2020–21 NCAA Division I men's basketball season. The Mountain Hawks, led by 14th-year head coach Brett Reed, played their home games at Stabler Arena in Bethlehem, Pennsylvania as members of the Patriot League. With the creation of mini-divisions to cut down on travel due to the COVID-19 pandemic, they play in the Central Division.

== Previous season ==
The Mountain Hawks finished the 2019–20 season 11–21, 7–11 in Patriot League play to finish in a tie for eighth place. They defeated Loyola (MD) in the first round of the Patriot League tournament, before losing in the quarterfinals to Colgate.

== Roster ==
2020–21 Lehigh Mountain Hawks men's basketball team
Players
Coaches

Pos.	#	Name	Height	Weight	Year	Previous school	Hometown
F	0	Jakob Alamudun	6 ft 6 in (1.98 m)	225 lb (102 kg)	So	Marina HS	Huntington Beach, CA
F	1	Jeameril Wilson	6 ft 7 in (2.01 m)	200 lb (91 kg)	Jr	Woodstock Academy	Chicago, IL
G	2	Jake Betlow	6 ft 2 in (1.88 m)	185 lb (84 kg)	So	St. Benedict's Prep	Mendham, NJ
G	4	Andrei Arion	6 ft 3 in (1.91 m)	180 lb (82 kg)	So	American International School of Bucharest	Bucharest, Romania
G	5	Evan Taylor	6 ft 6 in (1.98 m)	200 lb (91 kg)	So	Glenbard West HS	Glen Ellyn, IL
G	10	Jalin Sinclair	5 ft 10 in (1.78 m)	182 lb (83 kg)	Fr	Suffield Academy	Manhattan, NY
G	11	Marques Wilson	6 ft 4 in (1.93 m)	210 lb (95 kg)	Sr	Edmond North HS	Edmond, OK
F	13	Luke Traina	6 ft 10 in (2.08 m)	206 lb (93 kg)	Jr	Germantown Academy	Doylestown, PA
G	15	Reed Fenton	6 ft 4 in (1.93 m)	165 lb (75 kg)	So	Greater Latrobe HS	Latrobe, PA
G	20	Jayshen Saigal	6 ft 2 in (1.88 m)	175 lb (79 kg)	Fr	Scarsdale HS	Scarsdale, NY
F	21	Ben Li	6 ft 6 in (1.98 m)	230 lb (104 kg)	Fr	Thornlea Secondary School	Toronto, ON
F/C	35	Dominic Parolin	6 ft 8 in (2.03 m)	230 lb (104 kg)	Fr	Centennial Secondary School	Coquitlam, BC
C	42	JT Tan	6 ft 8 in (2.03 m)	280 lb (127 kg)	Fr	Rolling Hills Prep	Redondo Beach, CA
C	44	Nic Lynch	6 ft 11 in (2.11 m)	250 lb (113 kg)	Jr	Seattle Prep	Seattle, WA

Head coach

- Brett Reed (Wayne State (MI))

Assistant coach(es)

- Harry Morra (DeSales)
- Noel Hightower (Chestnut Hill)
- Quinn McDowell (William & Mary)

Legend

- (C) Team captain
- (S) Suspended
- (I) Ineligible
- (W) Walk-on
- Injured
- Current redshirt

Roster
Last update: February 2, 2021

== Schedule and results ==
Date time, TV	Rank^{#}	Opponent^{#}	Result	Record	Site (attendance) city, state
Patriot League regular season
January 2, 2021; 2:00 pm, ESPN+		Lafayette	W 90–89 ^{OT}	1–0 (1–0)	Stabler Arena; Bethlehem, PA
January 3, 2021; 4:00 pm, CBSSN		at Lafayette	L 70–82	1–1 (1–1)	Kirby Sports Center; Easton, PA
January 9, 2021; 2:00 pm, ESPN+		Navy	L 61–69	1–2 (1–2)	Stabler Arena; Bethlehem, PA
January 9, 2021; 2:00 pm, ESPN+		American	Postponed		Stabler Arena; Bethlehem, PA
January 10, 2021; 3:00 pm, ESPN+		at Navy	L 58–73	1–3 (1–3)	Alumni Hall; Annapolis, MD
January 10, 2021; 4:00 pm, ESPN+		at American	Postponed		Bender Arena; Washington, D.C.
January 16, 2021; 2:00 pm, ESPN+		at Bucknell	L 70–75	1–4 (1–4)	Sojka Pavilion; Lewisburg, PA
January 17, 2021; 4:00 pm, SEN/ESPN+		Bucknell	L 61–77	1–5 (1–5)	Stabler Arena; Bethlehem, PA
January 23, 2021; 2:00 pm, ESPN+		at Holy Cross	W 75–72	2–5 (2–5)	Hart Center; Worcester, MA
January 24, 2021; 2:00 pm, ESPN+		at Holy Cross	W 82–74	3–5 (3–5)	Hart Center; Worcester, MA
January 30, 2021; 2:00 pm, ESPN+		Bucknell	L 70–84	3–6 (3–6)	Stabler Arena; Bethlehem, PA
January 31, 2021; 2:00 pm, ESPN+		at Bucknell	L 68–92	3–7 (3–7)	Sojka Pavilion; Lewisburg, PA
February 6, 2021; 2:00 pm, ESPN+		at Lafayette	Postponed		Kirby Sports Center; Easton, PA
February 7, 2021; 4:00 pm, ESPN+		Lafayette	Postponed		Stabler Arena; Bethlehem, PA
February 20, 2021; 4:00 pm, ESPN+		Loyola (MD)	L 47–75	3–8 (3–8)	Stabler Arena; Bethlehem, PA
February 21, 2021; 6:00 pm, ESPN+		at Loyola (MD)	W 76–72	4–8 (4–8)	Reitz Arena; Baltimore, MD
February 20, 2021; 3:00 pm, ESPN+		Colgate	Canceled		Stabler Arena; Bethlehem, PA
February 21, 2021; 6:00 pm, CBSSN		at Colgate	Canceled		Cotterell Court; Hamilton, NY
February 27, 2021; 2:00 pm, ESPN+		at Lafayette	L 69–75	4–9 (4–9)	Kirby Sports Center; Easton, PA
February 28, 2021; 4:00 pm, ESPN+		Lafayette	L 70–71	4–10 (4–10)	Stabler Arena; Bethlehem, PA
Patriot League tournament
March 3, 2021; 7:00 pm, ESPN+	(10)	at (7) Boston University; First round	L 58–69	4–11	Case Gym; Boston, MA
*Non-conference game. ^{#}Rankings from AP Poll. (#) Tournament seedings in parentheses. All times are in Eastern.
