= 2020–21 Army Black Knights men's basketball team =

American college basketball season

2020–21 Army Black Knights men's basketball

CBI, quarterfinals
- Conference: Patriot League
- Record: 12–10 (7–7 Patriot)
- Head coach: Jimmy Allen (5th season)
- Assistant coaches: David Belfield; Ben Wilkins; Zak Boisvert; David Belfield
- Home arena: Christl Arena

2020–21 Patriot League men's basketball standings
	Conf.				Overall
Team	W		L	PCT	W		L	PCT
North
Colgate †	11	–	1	.917	14	–	2	.875
Army	7	–	7	.500	12	–	10	.545
Boston University	6	–	10	.375	7	–	11	.389
Holy Cross	5	–	11	.313	5	–	11	.313
Central
Lafayette	9	–	5	.643	9	–	6	.600
Bucknell	4	–	6	.400	5	–	7	.417
Lehigh	4	–	10	.286	4	–	11	.267
South
Navy	12	–	1	.923	15	–	3	.833
American	4	–	5	.444	4	–	6	.400
Loyola	4	–	10	.286	6	–	11	.353
† 2021 Patriot League tournament winner

The 2020–21 Army Black Knights men's basketball team represented the United States Military Academy during the 2020–21 NCAA Division I men's basketball season. The Black Knights were led by fifth-year head coach Jimmy Allen, and played their home games at Christl Arena in West Point, New York as members of the Patriot League. They finished the season 12–10, 7–7 in Patriot League play, to finish in second place in the North Division. They earned the fourth seed in the Patriot League tournament, losing in the semifinals to Loyola. They were invited to the College Basketball Invitational (the program's first-ever invitation to this tournament) where they lost to Bellarmine in the quarterfinals.

== Previous season ==
The Black Knights finished the 2020–21 season with a record of 15–15, 10–8 in Patriot League play, to finish in a tie for fourth place. They lost in the quarterfinals of the Patriot League tournament to Lafayette.

== Roster ==
2020–21 Army Black Knights men's basketball team
Players
Coaches

Pos.	#	Name	Height	Weight	Year	Previous school	Hometown
G	0	Josh Caldwell	6 ft 2 in (1.88 m)	185 lb (84 kg)	Jr	Heathwood Hall (USMAPS)	Columbia, SC
G	1	Jalen Rucker	5 ft 10 in (1.78 m)	180 lb (82 kg)	Fr	Gilman (USMAPS)	Baltimore, MD
G	2	Brendan Thiele	6 ft 5 in (1.96 m)	205 lb (93 kg)	Jr	St. Peter's Prep	Kearny, NJ
G	3	Traye Carson	5 ft 8 in (1.73 m)	160 lb (73 kg)	Fr	Westside (USMAPS)	Anderson, SC
F	4	Chris Mann	6 ft 6 in (1.98 m)	205 lb (93 kg)	So	Phillipsburg (USMAPS)	Phillipsburg, NJ
G	5	Mark Madden (C)	6 ft 5 in (1.96 m)	210 lb (95 kg)	Sr	St. Joseph (USMAPS)	South Bend, IN
G	10	Tucker Blackwell	6 ft 2 in (1.88 m)	190 lb (86 kg)	Sr	Bloomington North (USMAPS)	Bloomington, IN
F	12	Nick Finke	6 ft 7 in (2.01 m)	223 lb (101 kg)	Sr	Champaign Central (USMAPS)	Champaign, IL
G	13	Lonnie Grayson (C)	6 ft 0 in (1.83 m)	180 lb (82 kg)	Sr	Wyoming HS	Cincinnati, OH
G	15	Noah Jager	5 ft 9 in (1.75 m)	165 lb (75 kg)	Fr	Bloomington South	Bloomington, IN
G	21	Zach Lezanic	6 ft 0 in (1.83 m)	165 lb (75 kg)	Fr	Conestoga	Berwyn, PA
G	22	Kwabena Davis	6 ft 3 in (1.91 m)	182 lb (83 kg)	Fr	Byron P. Steele (USMAPS)	Columbia, SC
G	23	Aaron Duhart	6 ft 0 in (1.83 m)	190 lb (86 kg)	Jr	Trinity Episcopal (USMAPS)	Richmond, VA
G	24	Jared Cross	6 ft 3 in (1.91 m)	196 lb (89 kg)	Fr	St. Stephen's & St. Agnes	Leesburg, VA
G	25	Jordan Coleman	6 ft 6 in (1.98 m)	190 lb (86 kg)	Jr	Greenwood (USMAPS)	Greenwood, SC
F	30	Ben Kinker	6 ft 9 in (2.06 m)	220 lb (100 kg)	Jr	Oldenburg Academy (USMAPS)	Greensburg, IN
G	32	John Scully	6 ft 1 in (1.85 m)	185 lb (84 kg)	Jr	Flower Mound (USMAPS)	Flower Mound, TX
F	34	Charlie Peterson	6 ft 9 in (2.06 m)	223 lb (101 kg)	Fr	North Central	Indianapolis, IN
F	35	Alex King	6 ft 8 in (2.03 m)	200 lb (91 kg)	Sr	Columbus North	Columbus, IN
G	43	Isaac Bullard	6 ft 4 in (1.93 m)	210 lb (95 kg)	Fr	Hendrickson (USMAPS)	Pflugerville, TX
F	44	Matt Dove	6 ft 10 in (2.08 m)	240 lb (109 kg)	Fr	Princeton Community (USMAPS)	Princeton, IN
F	52	Ben Jensen	6 ft 10 in (2.08 m)	200 lb (91 kg)	So	W.T. Woodson	Fairfax, VA
G	53	Zach Rocco	6 ft 1 in (1.85 m)	180 lb (82 kg)	Fr	Penn-Trafford	Export, PA
F	54	Abe Johnson	6 ft 8 in (2.03 m)	225 lb (102 kg)	Fr	Hellgate	Missoula, MT

Head coach

- Jimmy Allen (Emory & Henry)

Assistant coach(es)

- Ben Wilkins (NC State)
- Zak Boisvert (Fordham)
- David Belfield (USC Aiken)

Legend

- (C) Team captain
- (S) Suspended
- (I) Ineligible
- (W) Walk-on
- Injured
- Current redshirt

Roster
Last update: January 10, 2021

== Schedule and results ==
Date time, TV	Rank^{#}	Opponent^{#}	Result	Record	High points	High rebounds	High assists	Site (attendance) city, state
Non-conference regular season
November 25, 2020; 6:30 p.m., ESPN+		USMMA	W 93–32	1–0	14 – Mann	7 – Caldwell; Finke; Peterson	8 – Jager	Christl Arena (100); West Point, NY
November 27, 2020; 2:00 p.m., FloHoops		vs. Central Connecticut; Basketball Hall of Fame Bubbleville	W 79–57	2–0	24 – Grayson	10 – Finke	6 – Rucker	Mohegan Sun Arena (0); Uncasville, CT
November 28, 2020; 3:00 p.m., FloHoops		vs. Buffalo; Basketball Hall of Fame Bubbleville	W 78–74	3–0	19 – Caldwell	10 – Caldwell	5 – Rucker	Mohegan Sun Arena (0); Uncasville, CT
December 2, 2020; 2:30 p.m., ESPN2		vs. Florida; Basketball Hall of Fame Bubbleville	L 69–76	3–1	13 – Grayson	8 – Grayson	6 – Rucker	Mohegan Sun Arena (0); Uncasville, CT
December 6, 2020; 4:00 p.m., ESPN+		La Salle	W 63–59	4–1	12 – Duhart; Grayson	6 – Caldwell	4 – Caldwell	Christl Arena (100); West Point, NY
Patriot League regular season
January 2, 2021; 3:00 p.m., ESPN+		at Colgate	L 57–101	4–2 (0–1)	9 – Grayson	3 – Grayson	3 – Coleman; Duhart	Cotterell Court; Hamilton, NY
January 3, 2021; 3:00 p.m., ESPN+		at Colgate	W 75–73	5–2 (1–1)	13 – Grayson	11 – Finke	7 – Rucker	Cotterell Court; Hamilton, NY
January 9, 2021; 3:00 p.m., ESPN+		at Holy Cross	W 83–68	6–2 (2–1)	20 – Caldwell	8 – Duhart	4 – Finke	Hart Center; Worcester, MA
January 10, 2021; 3:00 p.m., ESPN+		Holy Cross	L 61–70	6–3 (2–2)	21 – King	8 – Peterson	3 – Finke	Christl Arena (7); West Point, NY
January 16, 2021; 1:00 p.m., ESPN+		at Boston University	W 79–59	7–3 (3–2)	20 – King	6 – Duhart	5 – Duhart	Case Gym; Boston, MA
January 17, 2021; 1:00 p.m., ESPN+		at Boston University	W 76–65	8–3 (4–2)	21 – Grayson	7 – Finke	6 – Duhart	Case Gym; Boston, MA
January 23, 2021; 2:30 p.m., CBSSN		at Navy	L 62–69	8–4 (4–3)	18 – Grayson	8 – Grayson	4 – Grayson	Alumni Hall (250); Annapolis, MD
January 24, 2021; 3:00 p.m., ESPN+		at Navy	W 87–78 ^{OT}	9–4 (5–3)	19 – Grayson	11 – King	4 – Rucker	Alumni Hall; Annapolis, MD
January 30, 2021; 3:00 p.m., ESPN+		Colgate	Postponed					Christl Arena; West Point, NY
January 31, 2022; 3:00 p.m., ESPN+		Colgate	Postponed					Christl Arena; West Point, NY
February 6, 2021; 2:30 p.m., ESPN+		Holy Cross	Postponed					Christl Arena; West Point, NY
February 7, 2021; 2:30 p.m., ESPN+		at Holy Cross	Postponed					Hart Center; Worcester, MA
February 13, 2021; 3:00 p.m., ESPN+		Boston University	Postponed					Christl Arena; West Point, NY
February 13, 2021; 4:00 p.m., ESPN+		Colgate	L 74–84	9–5 (5–4)	14 – Grayson; King	8 – Finke	4 – Rucker	Christl Arena; West Point, NY
February 14, 2021; 3:00 p.m., ESPN+		Boston University	Postponed					Christl Arena; West Point, NY
February 14, 2021; 6:00 p.m., CBSSN		Colgate	L 83–92	9–6 (5–5)	18 – Grayson; Rucker	11 – Grayson	3 – Finke	Christl Arena; West Point, NY
February 20, 2021; ESPN+		Navy	Cancelled					Christl Arena; West Point, NY
February 20, 2021; 3:00 p.m., ESPN+		Holy Cross	W 69–65	10–6 (6–5)	13 – Caldwell	7 – Finke	2 – Blackwell; Duhart; Rucker	Christl Arena (45); West Point, NY
February 21, 2021; 3:00 p.m., ESPN+		Navy	Cancelled					Christl Arena; West Point, NY
February 21, 2021; 3:00 p.m., ESPN+		at Holy Cross	L 51–67	10–7 (6–6)	14 – Grayson	7 – Grayson; Peterson	3 – Caldwell; King	Hart Center; Worcester, MA
February 27, 2021; 3:00 p.m., ESPN+		Boston University	L 63–75	10–8 (6–7)	17 – King	5 – Caldwell; King	3 – Multiple	Christl Arena; West Point, NY
February 28, 2021; 3:00 p.m., ESPN+		Boston University	W 57–55	11–8 (7–7)	19 – King	9 – Finke	5 – Grayson	Christl Arena; West Point, NY
Patriot League tournament
March 6, 2021; 3:00 p.m., ESPN+	(4)	(5) American; Quarterfinals	W 89–66	12–8	20 – King	9 – King	5 – Rucker	Christl Arena; West Point, NY
March 10, 2021; 5:30 p.m., CBSSN	(4)	(9) Loyola; Semifinals	L 63–67	12–9	21 – Caldwell; Rucker	6 – Rucker	2 – Grayson; Rucker	Christl Arena; West Point, NY
College Basketball Invitational
March 22, 2021; 8:30 p.m., FloSports		Bellarmine; Quarterfinals	L 67–77	12–10	14 – King	10 – King	4 – Duhart	Ocean Center; Daytona Beach, FL
*Non-conference game. ^{#}Rankings from AP poll. (#) Tournament seedings in parentheses. All times are in Eastern.
