= 2020–21 Lafayette Leopards men's basketball team =

American college basketball season

2020–21 Lafayette Leopards men's basketball

Patriot League Central division champions
- Conference: Patriot League
- Central Division
- Record: 9–6 (9–5 Patriot)
- Head coach: Fran O'Hanlon (26th season)
- Assistant coaches: Jarren Dyson; Justin Burrell; Andrew Radomicki
- Home arena: Kirby Sports Center

2020–21 Patriot League men's basketball standings
	Conf.				Overall
Team	W		L	PCT	W		L	PCT
North
Colgate †	11	–	1	.917	14	–	2	.875
Army	7	–	7	.500	12	–	10	.545
Boston University	6	–	10	.375	7	–	11	.389
Holy Cross	5	–	11	.313	5	–	11	.313
Central
Lafayette	9	–	5	.643	9	–	6	.600
Bucknell	4	–	6	.400	5	–	7	.417
Lehigh	4	–	10	.286	4	–	11	.267
South
Navy	12	–	1	.923	15	–	3	.833
American	4	–	5	.444	4	–	6	.400
Loyola	4	–	10	.286	6	–	11	.353
† 2021 Patriot League tournament winner

The 2020–21 Lafayette Leopards men's basketball team represented Lafayette College in the 2020–21 NCAA Division I men's basketball season. The Leopards, led by 26th-year head coach Fran O'Hanlon, play their home games at the Kirby Sports Center in Easton, Pennsylvania as members of the Patriot League. With the creation of mini-divisions to cut down on travel due to the COVID-19 pandemic, they play in the Central Division.

== Previous season ==
The Leopards finished the 2019–20 season 19–12, 10–8 in Patriot League play to finish in a tie for fourth place. They defeated Army in the quarterfinals of the Patriot League tournament, before losing in the semifinals to Colgate.

== Roster ==
2020–21 Lafayette Leopards men's basketball team
Players
Coaches

Pos.	#	Name	Height	Weight	Year	Previous school	Hometown
G	1	Ryan Zambie	6 ft 3 in (1.91 m)	190 lb (86 kg)	Fr	Choate Rosemary Hall	Plano, Texas
G	2	Jon Brantley	6 ft 3 in (1.91 m)	190 lb (86 kg)	Fr	Brother Rice High School	Farmington Hills, Michigan
G	3	Tyrone Perry	6 ft 2 in (1.88 m)	165 lb (75 kg)	Jr	Wekiva High School	Apopka, Florida
G	4	Jay Vaughan	5 ft 11 in (1.8 m)	172 lb (78 kg)	Jr	Allentown Central Catholic High School	Allentown, Pennsylvania
G	5	Eric Sondberg	6 ft 7 in (2.01 m)	190 lb (86 kg)	Fr	South River High School	Davidsonville, Maryland
G	11	Justin Jaworski	6 ft 3 in (1.91 m)	196 lb (89 kg)	Sr	Perkiomen Valley High School	Schwenksville, Pennsylvania
F	12	Tomas Verbinskis	6 ft 8 in (2.03 m)	217 lb (98 kg)	Jr	Richmond	Klaipėda, Lithuania
F	13	Sean Good	6 ft 10 in (2.08 m)	206 lb (93 kg)	Jr	Trinity High School	Camp Hill, Pennsylvania
F	14	Kyle Jenkins	6 ft 7 in (2.01 m)	213 lb (97 kg)	Fr	Hotchkiss School	Higganum, Connecticut
G	20	E.J. Stephens	6 ft 3 in (1.91 m)	176 lb (80 kg)	Sr	St. Thomas Aquinas High School	Plantation, Florida
G	21	Alex Petrie	6 ft 2 in (1.88 m)	185 lb (84 kg)	Sr	St. Christopher's School	Midlothian, Virginia
F	32	Michael Anekwe	6 ft 7 in (2.01 m)	221 lb (100 kg)	Jr	Besant Hill School	Lagos, Nigeria
F	33	Leo O'Boyle	6 ft 7 in (2.01 m)	220 lb (100 kg)	So	Scranton Prep	Scranton, Pennsylvania
F	44	Dylan Hastings	6 ft 9 in (2.06 m)	220 lb (100 kg)	Sr	Solanco High School	Quarryville, Pennsylvania
F	45	Neal Quinn	7 ft 0 in (2.13 m)	280 lb (127 kg)	So	Ramapo High School	Allendale, New Jersey

Head coach

- Fran O'Hanlon (Villanova)

Assistant coach(es)

- Jarren Dyson (Emory & Henry)
- Justin Purrell (Holy Cross)
- Andrew Radomicki (Widener)

Legend

- (C) Team captain
- (S) Suspended
- (I) Ineligible
- (W) Walk-on
- Injured
- Current redshirt

Roster
Last update: January 17, 2021

== Schedule and results ==
Date time, TV	Rank^{#}	Opponent^{#}	Result	Record	Site (attendance) city, state
Patriot League regular season
January 2, 2021; 2:00 pm, ESPN+		at Lehigh	L 89–90 ^{OT}	0–1 (0–1)	Stabler Arena; Bethlehem, PA
January 3, 2021; 4:00 pm, CBSSN		Lehigh	W 82–70	1–1 (1–1)	Kirby Sports Center; Easton, PA
January 9, 2021; 4:00 pm, ESPN+		at Bucknell	W 83–60	2–1 (2–1)	Sojka Pavilion; Lewisburg, PA
January 10, 2021; 6:00 pm, ESPN+/SNY		Bucknell	W 87–76	3–1 (3–1)	Kirby Sports Center; Easton, PA
January 16, 2021; 4:00 pm, ESPN+		Loyola (MD)	W 77–75	4–1 (4–1)	Kirby Sports Center; Easton, PA
January 17, 2021; 6:00 pm, CBSSN		at Loyola (MD)	W 72–70	5–1 (5–1)	Reitz Arena; Baltimore, MD
January 23, 2021; 4:00 pm, ESPN+		Boston University	L 76–81	5–2 (5–2)	Kirby Sports Center; Easton, PA
January 24, 2021; 6:00 pm, CBSSN		Boston University	L 61–64	5–3 (5–3)	Kirby Sports Center; Easton, PA
January 30, 2021; 2:00 pm, ESPN+		at American	Postponed		Bender Arena; Washington, D.C.
January 31, 2021; 4:00 pm, ESPN+		American	Postponed		Kirby Sports Center; Easton, PA
February 6, 2021; 2:00 pm, ESPN+		Lehigh	Postponed		Kirby Sports Center; Easton, PA
February 7, 2021; 12:00 pm		at Loyola (MD)	L 62–75	5–4 (5–4)	Reitz Arena; Baltimore, MD
February 7, 2021; 4:00 pm, ESPN+		at Lehigh	Postponed		Stabler Arena; Bethlehem, PA
February 8, 2021; 7:00 pm, ESPN+		Loyola (MD)	W 80–76	6–4 (6–4)	Kirby Sports Center; Easton, PA
February 13, 2021; 2:00 pm, ESPN+		Loyola (MD)	W 97–94 ^{3OT}	7–4 (7–4)	Kirby Sports Center; Easton, PA
February 14, 2021; 5:00 pm, ESPN+		at Loyola (MD)	L 69–88	7–5 (7–5)	Reitz Arena; Baltimore, MD
February 20, 2021; 4:00 pm, ESPN+		Bucknell	Postponed		Kirby Sports Center; Easton, PA
February 21, 2021; 6:00 pm, ESPN+		at Bucknell	Postponed		Sojka Pavilion; Lewisburg, PA
February 27, 2021; 4:00 pm, ESPN+		Lehigh	W 75–69	8–5 (8–5)	Kirby Sports Center; Easton, PA
February 28, 2021; 6:00 pm, ESPN+		at Lehigh	W 71–70	9–5 (9–5)	Stabler Arena; Bethlehem, PA
Patriot League tournament
March 6, 2021; 2:00 pm, ESPN+	(3)	(6) Bucknell; Quarterfinals	L 84–92	9–6	Kirby Sports Center; Easton, PA
*Non-conference game. ^{#}Rankings from AP Poll. (#) Tournament seedings in parentheses. All times are in Eastern.
