= 2020–21 Boston University Terriers men's basketball team =

American college basketball season

2020–21 Boston University Terriers men's basketball
- Conference: Patriot League
- North Division
- Record: 7–11 (6–10 Patriot)
- Head coach: Joe Jones (10th season)
- Assistant coaches: Curtis Wilson; Walt Corbean; Mike Quinn
- Home arena: Case Gym

2020–21 Patriot League men's basketball standings
	Conf.				Overall
Team	W		L	PCT	W		L	PCT
North
Colgate †	11	–	1	.917	14	–	2	.875
Army	7	–	7	.500	12	–	10	.545
Boston University	6	–	10	.375	7	–	11	.389
Holy Cross	5	–	11	.313	5	–	11	.313
Central
Lafayette	9	–	5	.643	9	–	6	.600
Bucknell	4	–	6	.400	5	–	7	.417
Lehigh	4	–	10	.286	4	–	11	.267
South
Navy	12	–	1	.923	15	–	3	.833
American	4	–	5	.444	4	–	6	.400
Loyola	4	–	10	.286	6	–	11	.353
† 2021 Patriot League tournament winner

The 2020–21 Boston University Terriers men's basketball team represented Boston University in the 2020–21 NCAA Division I men's basketball season. The Terriers, led by tenth-year head coach Joe Jones, play their home games at Case Gym as members of the Patriot League. With the creation of mini-divisions to cut down on travel due to the COVID-19 pandemic, they will play in the North Division.

== Previous season ==
The Terriers finished the 2019–20 season 21–13, 12–6 in Patriot League play to finish in a tie for second place. They defeated Navy, Bucknell and Colgate to be champions of the Patriot League tournament. They received the Patriot League's automatic bid to the NCAA tournament. However, the NCAA Tournament was cancelled amid the COVID-19 pandemic.

== Roster ==
2020–21 Boston University Terriers men's basketball team
Players
Coaches

Pos.	#	Name	Height	Weight	Year	Previous school	Hometown
G	0	Ethan Brittain-Watts	6 ft 2 in (1.88 m)	180 lb (82 kg)	So	Culver Academies	Indianapolis, Indiana
G	1	Garrett Pascoe	6 ft 3 in (1.91 m)	180 lb (82 kg)	So	Clayton Valley Charter High School	Concord, California
G	2	Caelan Jones	6 ft 5 in (1.96 m)	190 lb (86 kg)	Fr	Vermont Academy	Los Angeles, California
G	3	Alex Vilarino	6 ft 2 in (1.88 m)	180 lb (82 kg)	Jr	Texas Tech	McKinney, Texas
G/F	5	Walter Whyte	6 ft 6 in (1.98 m)	210 lb (95 kg)	Jr	St. Luke's School	New Haven, Connecticut
G	13	Daman Tate	6 ft 5 in (1.96 m)	190 lb (86 kg)	RS Fr	Cushing Academy	Roxbury, Massachusetts
G	14	Andrew Petcash	6 ft 4 in (1.93 m)	200 lb (91 kg)	Sr	Pine-Richland High School	Pittsburgh, Pennsylvania
G	15	Jonas Harper (W)	6 ft 2 in (1.88 m)	190 lb (86 kg)	Jr	St. Luke's School	Stamford, Connecticut
G	20	Tarkan Taboglu (W)	6 ft 2 in (1.88 m)	185 lb (84 kg)	So	Torrey Pines High School	San Diego, California
F	21	Andrew Patnode	6 ft 8 in (2.03 m)	230 lb (104 kg)	Fr	Perkiomen School	Saratoga Springs, New York
G/F	22	Anthony Morales	6 ft 8 in (2.03 m)	195 lb (88 kg)	Fr	Beaver Country Day School	Boston, Massachusetts
G	24	Miles Brewster	6 ft 3 in (1.91 m)	175 lb (79 kg)	Fr	Hotchkiss School	Brooklyn, New York
G	30	Javante McCoy	6 ft 5 in (1.96 m)	180 lb (82 kg)	Sr	Phillips Exeter Academy	Milwaukee, Wisconsin
G	31	Michael Quinn (W)	6 ft 0 in (1.83 m)	180 lb (82 kg)	So	Taunton High School	Taunton, Massachusetts
F	32	Jack Hemphill	6 ft 9 in (2.06 m)	230 lb (104 kg)	Jr	Ravenscroft School	Raleigh, North Carolina
F	34	Tim Uzoegbu (W)	6 ft 4 in (1.93 m)	185 lb (84 kg)	So	Medway High School	Medway, Massachusetts
G/F	35	Fletcher Tynen	6 ft 7 in (2.01 m)	195 lb (88 kg)	Jr	Bishop Montgomery High School	Torrance, California
F	41	Sukhmail Mathon	6 ft 10 in (2.08 m)	225 lb (102 kg)	Sr	Holderness School	Shavertown, Pennsylvania

Head coach

- Joe Jones (SUNY–Oswego)

Assistant coach(es)

- Curtis Wilson (Adelphi)
- Walt Corbean (Northern Kentucky)
- Mike Quinn (Bentley)

Legend

- (C) Team captain
- (S) Suspended
- (I) Ineligible
- (W) Walk-on
- Injured
- Current redshirt

Roster
Last update: January 14, 2021

== Schedule and results ==
Date time, TV	Rank^{#}	Opponent^{#}	Result	Record	Site (attendance) city, state
Patriot League regular season
January 4, 2021; 2:00 pm, ESPN+		at Holy Cross	W 83–76	1–0 (1–0)	Hart Center; Worcester, MA
January 5, 2021; 2:00 pm, ESPN+		Holy Cross	L 66–68	1–1 (1–1)	Case Gym; Boston, MA
January 9, 2021; 6:00 pm, ESPN+		Colgate	L 79–86	1–2 (1–2)	Case Gym; Boston, MA
January 10, 2021; 6:00 pm, CBSSN		Colgate	L 45–89	1–3 (1–3)	Case Gym; Boston, MA
January 16, 2021; 1:00 pm, ESPN+		Army	L 59–79	1–4 (1–4)	Case Gym; Boston, MA
January 17, 2021; 1:00 pm, ESPN+		Army	L 65–76	1–5 (1–5)	Case Gym; Boston, MA
January 23, 2021; 4:00 pm, ESPN+		at Lafayette	W 81–76	2–5 (2–5)	Kirby Sports Center; Easton, PA
January 24, 2021; 6:00 pm, CBSSN		at Lafayette	W 64–61	3–5 (3–5)	Kirby Sports Center; Easton, PA
February 13, 2021; 2:00 pm, ESPN+		at Holy Cross	L 65–82	3–6 (3–6)	Hart Center; Worcester, MA
February 14, 2021; 5:00 pm, ESPN+		Holy Cross	W 86–68	4–6 (4–6)	Case Gym; Boston, MA
February 17, 2021; 5:00 pm, ESPN+		at Holy Cross	W 78–69	5–6 (5–6)	Hart Center; Worcester, MA
February 20, 2021; 1:00 pm, ESPN+		at Colgate	L 72–82	5–7 (5–7)	Cotterell Court; Hamilton, NY
February 21, 2021; 1:00 pm, ESPN+		at Colgate	L 63–78	5–8 (5–8)	Cotterell Court; Hamilton, NY
February 24, 2021; 7:00 pm, ESPN+		Holy Cross	L 75–86	5–9 (5–9)	Case Gym; Boston, MA
February 27, 2021; 3:00 pm, ESPN+		at Army	W 75–63	6–9 (6–9)	Christl Arena; West Point, NY
February 28, 2021; 3:00 pm, ESPN+		at Army	L 55–57	6–10 (6–10)	Christl Arena; West Point, NY
Patriot League tournament
March 3, 2021; 7:00 pm, ESPN+	(7)	(10) Lehigh; First round	W 69–58	7–10	Case Gym; Boston, MA
March 6, 2021; 7:00 pm, ESPN+	(7)	at (2) Colgate; Quarterfinals	L 69–77	7–11	Cotterell Court; Hamilton, NY
*Non-conference game. ^{#}Rankings from AP Poll. (#) Tournament seedings in parentheses. All times are in Eastern.
