= Brett Nelson (basketball) =

American basketball player and coach (born 1980)

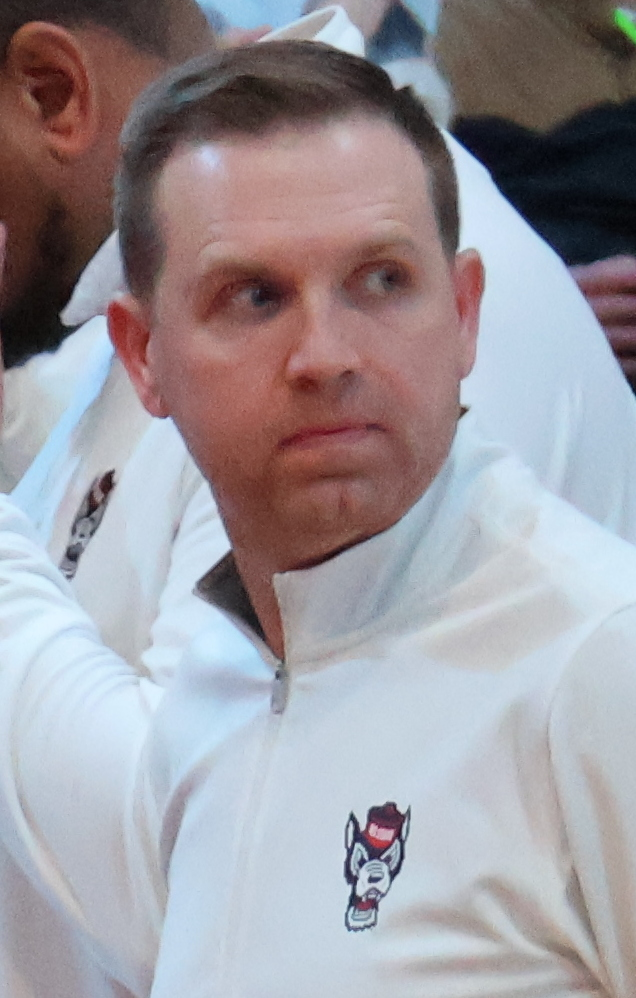
- Nelson with NC State in 2025

Current position
- Title: Assistant coach
- Team: VCU
- Conference: A10

Biographical details
- Born: October 22, 1980 (age 46); St. Albans, West Virginia, U.S.

Playing career
- 1999–2003: Florida

Coaching career (HC unless noted)
- 2007–2010: Marshall (assistant)
- 2010–2011: Arkansas (assistant)
- 2011–2013: Drake (assistant)
- 2013–2014: Ball State (assistant)
- 2014–2017: Marquette (assistant)
- 2017–2019: Marquette (Associate HC)
- 2019–2023: Holy Cross
- 2023–2024: UMass (assistant)
- 2024–2025: NC State (assistant)
- 2025–present: VCU (assistant)

Head coaching record
- Overall: 27–84 (.243)

Brett Nelson (born October 22, 1980) is an American college basketball coach and former player. He is currently an assistant coach at VCU under head coach Phil Martelli Jr.

== Playing career ==
A 1999 McDonald's All-American, Nelson was a standout at Saint Albans High School in West Virginia and was the state's player of the year his senior season. Nelson would play college basketball at Florida under Billy Donovan where he was a three-year starter and member of the Gators' 2000 NCAA tournament runner-up squad. He ended his career as a two-time All-SEC selection as well as the school's leader in three-pointers made and attempted. At the time of his graduation, Nelson finished with career averages of 11.0 points per game and ranked second in steals and fourteenth in points scored in school history.

== Coaching career ==
Nelson briefly played professional basketball overseas in Sweden, but left to pursue a career as director of basketball operations at Colorado State and then at VCU for a season each from 2005 to 2007. His first assistant coaching position was under Donnie Jones at Marshall, who was an assistant at Florida during Nelson's playing days. After three years with the Thundering Herd, Nelson had a one-year stop as an assistant at Arkansas under another former Florida assistant, John Pelphrey, before a two-year stint at Drake.

After one year as an assistant at Ball State, Nelson joined the staff at Marquette in 2014, where he was on staff for two Golden Eagles NCAA Tournament squads. On July 9, 2019 Nelson was named the 18th head coach in Holy Cross history, replacing the retiring Bill Carmody.

In his first year as head coach, Nelson led a rebuilding Crusaders team to a record of 3-29, with his first victory as a head coach coming on December 2, 2019 against Mercer. On March 10, 2023, it was announced that Nelson would not return, after 4 seasons.

On May 31, 2023, UMass head coach Frank Martin announced the hiring of Nelson as an assistant coach on his staff. A year later, Nelson was hired as assistant coach at North Carolina State.

== Head coaching record ==
Record table
Season	Team	Overall	Conference	Standing	Postseason
Holy Cross (Patriot) (2019–2023)
2019–20	Holy Cross	3–29	2–16	10th	
2020–21	Holy Cross	5–11	5–11	4th (North)	
2021–22	Holy Cross	9–22	7–11	T-7th	
2022–23	Holy Cross	10–22	7–11	T-6th	
Holy Cross:		27–84 (.243)	21–49 (.300)		
Total:		27–84 (.243)			
National champion Postseason invitational champion Conference regular season champion Conference regular season and conference tournament champion Division regular season champion Division regular season and conference tournament champion Conference tournament champion
