= 2020–21 Jacksonville Dolphins men's basketball team =

American college basketball season

2020–21 Jacksonville Dolphins men's basketball
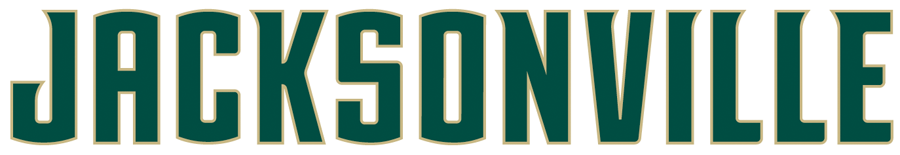
- Conference: Atlantic Sun Conference
- Record: 11–13 (5–9 ASUN)
- Head coach: Tony Jasick (7th season)
- Assistant coaches: Dan Bere; Chad Eshbaugh; Vince Martin
- Home arena: Swisher Gymnasium

2020–21 ASUN men's basketball standings
	Conf.				Overall
Team	W		L	PCT	W		L	PCT
Liberty †	11	–	2	.846	23	–	6	.793
Bellarmine *	10	–	3	.769	14	–	8	.636
Lipscomb	9	–	6	.600	15	–	12	.556
North Florida	6	–	6	.500	8	–	15	.348
North Alabama *	7	–	8	.467	13	–	11	.542
Florida Gulf Coast	4	–	5	.444	10	–	8	.556
Stetson	7	–	9	.438	12	–	15	.444
Jacksonville	5	–	9	.357	11	–	13	.458
Kennesaw State	2	–	13	.133	5	–	19	.208
† 2021 ASUN Tournament winner * ineligible for the 2021 NCAA tournament due to transition period Jacksonville suspended their season on February 26, 2021

The 2020–21 Jacksonville Dolphins men's basketball team represented Jacksonville University in the 2020–21 NCAA Division I men's basketball season. The Dolphins, led by 7th-year head coach Tony Jasick, played their home games at Swisher Gymnasium on the university's Jacksonville, Florida campus as members of the Atlantic Sun Conference. They finished the season 11–13 5–9 in ASUN Play to finish in 8th place. They suspended their season on February 26 due to some concerns over COVID-19.

== Previous season ==
The Dolphins finished the 2019–20 season 14–18, 7–9 in ASUN play to finish in a tie for sixth place. They lost in the quarterfinals of the ASUN tournament to North Florida.

== Roster ==
2020–21 Jacksonville Dolphins men's basketball team
Players
Coaches

Pos.	#	Name	Height	Weight	Year	Previous school	Hometown
F	0	Dontarius James	6 ft 8 in (2.03 m)	228 lb (103 kg)	Jr	Xavier	Kershaw, South Carolina
G	1	Diante Wood	6 ft 4 in (1.93 m)	210 lb (95 kg)	So	Alabama	Anniston, Alabama
G	2	Corey Romich	6 ft 4 in (1.93 m)	205 lb (93 kg)	Sr	Vermont Academy	Groton, Massachusetts
G	3	Kevion Nolan	6 ft 2 in (1.88 m)	170 lb (77 kg)	RS Jr	Samford	Anniston, Alabama
G	5	Loseni Kamara	6 ft 3 in (1.91 m)	185 lb (84 kg)	Jr	Indian Hills Community College	Brooklyn Park, Minnesota
G	11	Trey Sides	6 ft 1 in (1.85 m)	170 lb (77 kg)	So	Phillipsburg High School	Phillipsburg, Kansas
F	13	Bryce Workman	6 ft 7 in (2.01 m)	230 lb (104 kg)	Jr	Sickles High School	Tampa, Florida
G	14	Mo Arnold	6 ft 2 in (1.88 m)	180 lb (82 kg)	So	Picayune Memorial High School	Picayune, Mississippi
G	20	Connor Thompson	6 ft 2 in (1.88 m)	190 lb (86 kg)	Fr	The Heritage School	Ellijay, Georgia
G/F	21	Derrick Flowers	6 ft 4 in (1.93 m)	200 lb (91 kg)	Sr	Prestonwood Christian Academy	Frisco, Texas
G	23	Tyreese Davis	6 ft 6 in (1.98 m)	210 lb (95 kg)	RS So	Link Prep	Kansas City, Missouri
F	30	Zameron Boozer	6 ft 9 in (2.06 m)	230 lb (104 kg)	Fr	Lanett High School	Lanett, Alabama
F	33	Cameron Boozer	6 ft 10 in (2.08 m)	240 lb (109 kg)	Fr	Lanett High School	Lanett, Alabama
G	34	Thomas Owen	6 ft 4 in (1.93 m)	185 lb (84 kg)	Jr	Saint Francis High School	Dunwoody, Georgia
F	35	Nick Erickson	6 ft 7 in (2.01 m)	180 lb (82 kg)	Fr	Hampshire High School	Gilberts, Illinois

Head coach

- Tony Jasick (Mars Hill College)

Assistant coach(es)

- Dan Bere' (Indiana)
- Chad Eshbaugh (Washburn)
- Vince Martin (Jacksonville)

Legend

- (C) Team captain
- (S) Suspended
- (I) Ineligible
- (W) Walk-on
- Injured
- Current redshirt

Roster
Last update: November 27, 2020

== Schedule and results ==
Date time, TV	Rank^{#}	Opponent^{#}	Result	Record	Site (attendance) city, state
Non-conference regular season
November 25, 2020*; 7:00 pm, ESPN+		Coastal Georgia	W 99–57	1–0	Swisher Gymnasium (50); Jacksonville, FL
November 28, 2020*; 2:00 pm, ESPN+		Southern Miss	W 66–51	2–0	Swisher Gymnasium (180); Jacksonville, FL
December 2, 2020*; 7:00 pm, ESPN+		Presbyterian	W 78–65	3–0	Swisher Gymnasium (180); Jacksonville, FL
December 4, 2020*; 7:00 pm, SECN		at Georgia	L 65–98	3–1	Stegeman Coliseum (1,638); Athens, GA
December 8, 2020*; 7:00 pm, ESPN+		Campbell; Dolphin Classic	L 78–80	3–2	Swisher Gymnasium (180); Jacksonville, FL
December 9, 2020*; 7:00 pm, ESPN+		Florida National; Dolphin Classic	W 78–69	4–2	Swisher Gymnasium (180); Jacksonville, FL
December 10, 2020*; 5:00 pm, ESPN+		New Orleans; Dolphin Classic	W 77–70	5–2	Swisher Gymnasium (180); Jacksonville, FL
December 13, 2020*; 2:00 pm		at South Carolina State	W 60–58	6–2	SHM Memorial Center (0); Orangeburg, SC
December 19, 2020*; 3:30 pm, FSFL		at Miami (FL)	L 64–73	6–3	Watsco Center (0); Coral Gables, FL
December 21, 2020*; 2:00 pm, Big 12 Now		at Kansas State	L 46–70	6–4	Bramlage Coliseum (504); Manhattan, KS
Atlantic Sun Conference regular season
January 1, 2021; 6:00 pm, ESPN+		at Kennesaw State	W 62–57	7–4 (1–0)	KSU Convocation Center (229); Kennesaw, GA
January 2, 2021; 4:00 pm, ESPN+		at Kennesaw State	W 72–66	8–4 (2–0)	KSU Convocation Center (215); Kennesaw, GA
January 8, 2021; 7:00 pm, ESPN+		North Florida	W 66–65	9–4 (3–0)	Swisher Gymnasium (180); Jacksonville, FL
January 9, 2021; 6:00 pm, ESPN+		North Florida	L 68–70	9–5 (3–1)	Swisher Gymnasium (180); Jacksonville, FL
January 22, 2021; 7:00 pm, ESPN+		at North Alabama	L 81–82 ^{OT}	9–6 (3–2)	Flowers Hall (351); Florence, AL
January 23, 2021; 7:00 pm, ESPN+		at North Alabama	L 54–76	9–7 (3–3)	Flowers Hall (385); Florence, AL
January 29, 2021; 7:00 pm, ESPN+		Liberty	L 54–59	9–8 (3–4)	Swisher Gymnasium (180); Jacksonville, FL
January 30, 2021; 6:00 pm, ESPN+		Liberty	L 58–64	9–9 (3–5)	Swisher Gymnasium (180); Jacksonville, FL
February 5, 2021; 7:00 pm, ESPN+		at Bellarmine	L 56–71	9–10 (3–6)	Freedom Hall (1,285); Louisville, KY
February 6, 2021; 5:00 pm, ESPN+		at Bellarmine	L 44–63	9–11 (3–7)	Freedom Hall; Louisville, KY
February 12, 2021; 7:00 pm, ESPN+		Lipscomb	W 66–60	10–11 (4–7)	Swisher Gymnasium (190); Jacksonville, FL
February 13, 2021; 6:00 pm, ESPN+		Lipscomb	L 69–71	10–12 (4–8)	Swisher Gymnasium (180); Jacksonville, FL
February 19, 2021; 7:00 pm, ESPN+		at Stetson	L 75–91	10–13 (4–9)	Edmunds Center (50); DeLand, FL
February 20, 2021; 7:00 pm, ESPN+		at Stetson	W 86–82	11–13 (5–9)	Edmunds Center (50); DeLand, FL
February 26, 2021; 7:00 pm, ESPN+		Florida Gulf Coast	Season suspended		Swisher Gymnasium; Jacksonville, FL
February 27, 2021; 6:00 pm, ESPN+		Florida Gulf Coast	Season suspended		Swisher Gymnasium; Jacksonville, FL
*Non-conference game. ^{#}Rankings from AP Poll. (#) Tournament seedings in parentheses. All times are in Eastern.
