= 2020–21 North Alabama Lions men's basketball team =

American college basketball season

2020–21 North Alabama Lions men's basketball
- Conference: Atlantic Sun Conference
- Record: 13–11 (7–8 ASUN)
- Head coach: Tony Pujol (3rd season)
- Assistant coaches: Ahmad Smith; Willie Watson; Tom Berryman
- Home arena: Flowers Hall

2020–21 ASUN men's basketball standings
	Conf.				Overall
Team	W		L	PCT	W		L	PCT
Liberty †	11	–	2	.846	23	–	6	.793
Bellarmine *	10	–	3	.769	14	–	8	.636
Lipscomb	9	–	6	.600	15	–	12	.556
North Florida	6	–	6	.500	8	–	15	.348
North Alabama *	7	–	8	.467	13	–	11	.542
Florida Gulf Coast	4	–	5	.444	10	–	8	.556
Stetson	7	–	9	.438	12	–	15	.444
Jacksonville	5	–	9	.357	11	–	13	.458
Kennesaw State	2	–	13	.133	5	–	19	.208
† 2021 ASUN Tournament winner * ineligible for the 2021 NCAA tournament due to transition period Jacksonville suspended their season on February 26, 2021

The 2020–21 North Alabama Lions men's basketball team represented the University of North Alabama in the 2020–21 NCAA Division I men's basketball season. The Lions, led by third-year head coach Tony Pujol, played their home games at Flowers Hall in Florence, Alabama, as members of the Atlantic Sun Conference (ASUN).

This season marked North Alabama's third of a four-year transition period from Division II to Division I. As a result, the Lions are not eligible for NCAA postseason play, but could participate in the ASUN tournament. They were also eligible to play in the CBI tournament, but not invited. They finished the season 13–11, 7–8 in ASUN Play to finish in 5th place. They defeated North Florida and Florida Gulf Coast to advance to the championship game of the ASUN tournament where they lost to Liberty.

== Previous season ==
The Lions finished the 2019–20 season 13–17, 8–8 in ASUN play, to finish in fifth place in the conference. They lost in the quarterfinals of the ASUN tournament to Stetson.

== Roster ==
2020–21 North Alabama Lions men's basketball team
Players
Coaches

Pos.	#	Name	Height	Weight	Year	Previous school	Hometown
G	0	Will Soucie	6 ft 5 in (1.96 m)	200 lb (91 kg)	Fr	Gill St. Bernard's School	Califon, New Jersey
G	1	Detalian Brown	6 ft 3 in (1.91 m)	195 lb (88 kg)	Fr	Combine Academy Prep	Chicago, Illinois
G	2	Jonathan Breeland, Jr.	6 ft 3 in (1.91 m)	193 lb (88 kg)	So	Neosho County CC	Columbia, South Carolina
G	3	Jamari Blackmon	6 ft 1 in (1.85 m)	205 lb (93 kg)	Jr	Hoover High School	Hoover, Alabama
F	4	Isaac Chatman	6 ft 6 in (1.98 m)	200 lb (91 kg)	Jr	Northeast Mississippi CC	Cordova, Alabama
F	5	Mervin James	6 ft 7 in (2.01 m)	215 lb (98 kg)	So	Pebblebrook High School	St. Thomas, U.S. Virgin Islands
C	10	Sawyer Wright	6 ft 8 in (2.03 m)	210 lb (95 kg)	Fr	Deshler High School	Tuscumbia, Alabama
G	11	C.J. Brim	5 ft 9 in (1.75 m)	170 lb (77 kg)	Sr	Pearl River Community College	Tupelo, Mississippi
F	13	James Anderson, II	6 ft 5 in (1.96 m)	200 lb (91 kg)	Sr	Cuyahoga Community College	Roswell, Georgia
F	14	Payton Youngblood	6 ft 5 in (1.96 m)	200 lb (91 kg)	RS Sr	Snead State Community College	Birmingham, Alabama
G	15	Coleman Barranco	5 ft 9 in (1.75 m)	150 lb (68 kg)	Fr	Vestavia Hills High School	Birmingham, Alabama
F	21	Emanuel Littles	6 ft 7 in (2.01 m)	215 lb (98 kg)	Jr	Lanett High School	Lanett, Alabama
G	22	Austin Meloche	6 ft 1 in (1.85 m)	180 lb (82 kg)	So	Calvary Christian High School	Palm Harbor, Florida
G	24	Aleksa Matic	6 ft 4 in (1.93 m)	210 lb (95 kg)	Jr	Sportksa Gimnazija	Belgrade, Serbia
F	34	Dallas Howell	6 ft 7 in (2.01 m)	210 lb (95 kg)	Fr	Enterprise High School	Coffee Springs, Alabama

Head coach

- Tony Pujol (Sterling (KS))

Assistant coach(es)

- Ahmad Smith (Appalachian State)
- Willie Watson (Alabama)
- Tom Barryman (Alabama)

Legend

- (C) Team captain
- (S) Suspended
- (I) Ineligible
- (W) Walk-on
- Injured
- Current redshirt

Roster
Last update: November 27, 2020

== Schedule and results ==
Date time, TV	Rank^{#}	Opponent^{#}	Result	Record	Site (attendance) city, state
Non-conference regular season
November 25, 2020*; 5:30 pm, ESPN+		Oakwood	W 98–74	1–0	Flowers Hall (187); Florence, AL
December 6, 2020*; 2:00 pm, ESPN+		Carver	W 107–40	2–0	Flowers Hall (194); Florence, AL
December 10, 2020*; 6:00 pm, ESPN+		Troy	L 57–62	2–1	Flowers Hall (312); Florence, AL
December 13, 2020*; 11:00 am, BTN		at Indiana	L 52–87	2–2	Simon Skjodt Assembly Hall; Bloomington, IN
December 17, 2020*; 6:00 pm, ESPN+		Crowley's Ridge	W 99–51	3–2	Flowers Hall (181); Florence, AL
December 20, 2020*; 2:00 pm, ESPN+		Freed–Hardeman	W 82–56	4–2	Flowers Hall; Florence, AL
Atlantic Sun Conference regular season
January 1, 2021; 6:00 pm		at Florida Gulf Coast	Postponed due to COVID-19 issues		Alico Arena; Fort Myers, FL
January 2, 2021; 6:00 pm		at Florida Gulf Coast	Postponed due to COVID-19 issues		Alico Arena; Fort Myers, FL
January 8, 2021; 6:00 pm, ESPN+		Stetson	L 77–86	4–3 (0–1)	Flowers Hall (392); Florence, AL
January 9, 2021; 6:00 pm, ESPN+		Stetson	W 73–66 ^{OT}	5–3 (1–1)	Flowers Hall (368); Florence, AL
January 15, 2021; 5:00 pm, ESPN+		at Kennesaw State	W 66–43	6–3 (2–1)	KSU Convocation Center (387); Kennesaw, GA
January 16, 2021; 3:00 pm, ESPN+		at Kennesaw State	W 66–64	7–3 (3–1)	KSU Convocation Center (348); Kennesaw, GA
January 22, 2021; 6:00 pm, ESPN+		Jacksonville	W 82–81 ^{OT}	8–3 (4–1)	Flowers Hall (351); Florence, AL
January 23, 2021; 6:00 pm, ESPN+		Jacksonville	W 76–54	9–3 (5–1)	Flowers Hall (385); Florence, AL
January 29, 2021; 6:00 pm, ESPN+		at North Florida	W 82–78	10–3 (6–1)	UNF Arena (807); Jacksonville, FL
January 30, 2021; 4:00 pm, ESPN+		at North Florida	L 72–82	10–4 (6–2)	UNF Arena (714); Jacksonville, FL
February 5, 2021; 6:00 pm, ESPN+		at Florida Gulf Coast	L 60–86	10–5 (6–3)	Alico Arena (821); Fort Myers, Florida
February 6, 2021; 6:00 pm, ESPN+		at Florida Gulf Coast	L 60–69	10–6 (6–4)	Alico Arena; Fort Myers, Florida
February 12, 2021; 6:00 pm, ESPN+		Bellarmine	L 64–66	10–7 (6–5)	Flowers Hall (283); Florence, AL
February 13, 2021; 6:00 pm, ESPN+		Bellarmine	L 63–87	10–8 (6–6)	Flowers Hall (317); Florence, AL
February 22, 2021; 11:00 am, ESPN+		at Liberty	L 54–74	10–9 (6–7)	Liberty Arena (250); Lynchburg, VA
February 23, 2021; 11:00 am, ESPN+		at Liberty	L 54–74	10–10 (6–8)	Liberty Arena (250); Lynchburg, VA
February 26, 2021; 6:00 pm		Lipscomb	Postponed due to COVID-19 issues		Flowers Hall; Florence, AL
February 27, 2021; 6:00 pm, ESPN+		Lipscomb	W 73–66	11–10 (7–8)	Flowers Hall; Florence, AL
Atlantic Sun tournament
March 4, 2021; 1:00 pm, ESPN+	(5)	vs. (4) North Florida; Quarterfinals	W 68–60	12–10	Swisher Gymnasium; Jacksonville, FL
March 4, 2021; 6:00 pm, ESPN+	(5)	vs. (6) Florida Gulf Coast; Semifinals	W 96–81	13–10	UNF Arena; Jacksonville, FL
March 7, 2021; 2:00 pm, ESPN	(5)	vs. (1) Liberty; Championship	L 75–79	13–11	UNF Arena; Jacksonville, FL
*Non-conference game. ^{#}Rankings from AP Poll. (#) Tournament seedings in parentheses. All times are in Central.
