= 2020–21 Miami Hurricanes men's basketball team =

American college basketball season

2020–21 Miami Hurricanes men's basketball
- Conference: Atlantic Coast Conference
- Record: 10–17 (4–15 ACC)
- Head coach: Jim Larrañaga (10th season)
- Assistant coaches: Chris Caputo; Adam Fisher; Bill Courtney
- Home arena: Watsco Center

2020–21 ACC men's basketball standings
	Conf.				Overall
Team	W		L	PCT	W		L	PCT
No. 15 Virginia	13	–	4	.765	18	–	7	.720
No. 14 Florida State	11	–	4	.733	18	–	7	.720
No. 25 Virginia Tech	9	–	4	.692	15	–	7	.682
Georgia Tech †	11	–	6	.647	17	–	9	.654
Clemson	10	–	6	.625	16	–	8	.667
North Carolina	10	–	6	.625	18	–	11	.621
Louisville	8	–	5	.615	13	–	7	.650
Syracuse	9	–	7	.563	18	–	10	.643
NC State	9	–	8	.529	14	–	11	.560
Duke	9	–	9	.500	13	–	11	.542
Notre Dame	7	–	11	.389	11	–	15	.423
Pittsburgh	6	–	10	.375	10	–	12	.455
Miami (FL)	4	–	15	.211	10	–	17	.370
Wake Forest	3	–	15	.167	6	–	16	.273
Boston College	2	–	11	.154	4	–	16	.200
† 2021 ACC tournament winner Rankings from AP poll

The 2020–21 Miami Hurricanes men's basketball team represented the University of Miami during the 2020–21 NCAA Division I men's basketball season. Led by tenth-year head coach Jim Larrañaga, they played their home games at the Watsco Center on the university's campus in Coral Gables, Florida as members of the Atlantic Coast Conference (ACC).

The Hurricanes finished the season 10–17, 4–15 in ACC play to finish in thirteenth place. In the ACC tournament, they defeated Pittsburgh in the first round, and Clemson in the second round, before losing to eventual champions Georgia Tech in the quarterfinals. They were not invited to either the NCAA tournament or NIT.

== Previous season ==
The Hurricanes finished the 2019–20 season 15–16, 7–13 in ACC play to finish in a tie for tenth place. They lost to Clemson in the second round of the ACC tournament. The tournament was cancelled before the quarterfinals, due to the COVID-19 pandemic. The NCAA tournament and NIT were also cancelled due to the pandemic.

== Offseason ==
=== Departures ===
Departures
Name	Number	Pos.	Height	Weight	Year	Hometown	Reason for departure
Dejan Vasiljevic	1	G	6'3"	190	Senior	Melbourne, Australia	Graduated
Keith Stone	4	F	6'8"	244	RS senior	Deerfield Beach, FL	Graduated

=== Incoming transfers ===
Incoming transfers
Name	Number	Pos.	Height	Weight	Year	Hometown	Previous school
Elijah Olaniyi	4	G	6'5"	205	Senior	Newark, NJ	Stony Brook

=== 2020 recruiting class ===
College recruiting
Name	Hometown	School	Height	Weight	Commit date
Earl Timberlake; G	Washington, D.C.	DeMatha Catholic (MD)	6 ft 6 in (1.98 m)	215 lb (98 kg)	Nov 4, 2019
Earl Timberlake; G	Recruit ratings: Rivals: 247Sports: ESPN: (88)				
Matt Cross; F	Beverly, MA	Brewster Academy (NH)	6 ft 6 in (1.98 m)	225 lb (102 kg)	Sep 3, 2019
Matt Cross; F	Recruit ratings: Rivals: 247Sports: ESPN: (82)				
Overall recruit ranking: Rivals: 48
Note: In many cases, Scout, Rivals, 247Sports, On3, and ESPN may conflict in their listings of height and weight.; In these cases, the average was taken. ESPN grades are on a 100-point scale.; Sources: "Miami 2020 Basketball Commitments". Rivals.; "Miami Hurricanes". ESPN.; "2020 Team Ranking". Rivals.

== Roster ==
2020–21 Miami Hurricanes men's basketball team
Players
Coaches

Pos.	#	Name	Height	Weight	Year	Hometown
G	0	Chris Lykes	5 ft 7 in (1.7 m)	160 lb (73 kg)	Sr	Mitchellville, MD
F	1	Anthony Walker	6 ft 9 in (2.06 m)	210 lb (95 kg)	So	Baltimore, MD
G	2	Isaiah Wong	6 ft 3 in (1.91 m)	180 lb (82 kg)	So	Piscataway, NJ
C	3	Nysier Brooks	7 ft 0 in (2.13 m)	240 lb (109 kg)	RS Sr	Philadelphia, PA
G	4	Elijah Olaniyi	6 ft 5 in (1.96 m)	205 lb (93 kg)	Sr	Newark, NJ
G	5	Harlond Beverly	6 ft 5 in (1.96 m)	185 lb (84 kg)	So	Detroit, MI
G	10	Filippos Gkogkos (W)	6 ft 3 in (1.91 m)	193 lb (88 kg)	So	Athens, Greece
G	13	Earl Timberlake	6 ft 6 in (1.98 m)	215 lb (98 kg)	Fr	Washington, D.C.
C	14	Rodney Miller Jr.	7 ft 0 in (2.13 m)	250 lb (113 kg)	RS Sr	Laurelton, NY
G	15	Willie Herenton (W)	6 ft 2 in (1.88 m)	180 lb (82 kg)	Sr	Lincolnshire, IL
F	21	Sam Waardenburg (injured)	6 ft 10 in (2.08 m)	225 lb (102 kg)	RS Sr	Auckland, New Zealand
F	22	Deng Gak	6 ft 11 in (2.11 m)	220 lb (100 kg)	RS Jr	Sydney, Australia
G	23	Kameron McGusty	6 ft 5 in (1.96 m)	190 lb (86 kg)	RS Sr	Katy, TX
F	33	Matt Cross	6 ft 7 in (2.01 m)	225 lb (102 kg)	Fr	Beverly, MA

Head coach

- Jim Larrañaga (Providence)

Assistant coach(es)

- Chris Caputo (Westfield State)
- Adam Fisher (Penn State)
- Bill Courtney (Bucknell)

Legend

- (C) Team captain
- (S) Suspended
- (I) Ineligible
- (W) Walk-on
- Injured
- Current redshirt

Roster
Last update: November 23, 2020

== Schedule and results ==
Date time, TV	Rank^{#}	Opponent^{#}	Result	Record	High points	High rebounds	High assists	Site (attendance) city, state
Regular season
Nov 29, 2020*; 6:00 p.m., ACCN		North Florida	W 77–59	1–0	20 – Wong	11 – Beverly	5 – Lykes	Watsco Center (0); Coral Gables, FL
Dec 4, 2020*; 8:00 p.m., ACCN		Stetson	W 82–60	2–0	20 – Lykes	12 – Wong	6 – Beverly	Watsco Center (0); Coral Gables, FL
Dec 8, 2020*; 5:00 p.m., ESPN2		Purdue; ACC–Big Ten Challenge	W 58–54	3–0	18 – McGusty	9 – Beverly	6 – Beverly	Watsco Center (0); Coral Gables, FL
Dec 12, 2020*; 12:00 p.m., ACCRSN		Florida Gulf Coast	L 62–66	3–1	20 – Wong	15 – Brooks	4 – Beverly	Watsco Center (0); Coral Gables, FL
Dec 16, 2020; 6:00 p.m., ACCN		Pittsburgh	L 55–70	3–2 (0–1)	21 – Wong	10 – Walker	3 – Tied	Watsco Center (0); Coral Gables, FL
Dec 19, 2020*; 3:30 p.m., ACCRSN		Jacksonville	W 73–64	4–2	25 – Wong	10 – Walker	3 – Beverly	Watsco Center (0); Coral Gables, FL
Dec 29, 2020; 6:00 p.m., ACCN		at No. 24 Virginia Tech	L 78–80	4–3 (0–2)	16 – Tied	9 – Beverly	6 – Beverly	Cassell Coliseum (250); Blacksburg, VA
Jan 2, 2021; 2:00 p.m., ACCRSN		Clemson	L 65–66	4–4 (0–3)	13 – Wong	8 – Timberlake	7 – Cross	Watsco Center (0); Coral Gables, FL
Jan 5, 2021; 8:00 p.m., ESPN		North Carolina	L 65–67	4–5 (0–4)	12 – Timberlake	6 – Brooks	5 – Timberlake	Watsco Center (0); Coral Gables, FL
Jan 9, 2021; 12:00 p.m., ACCRSN		at NC State	W 64–59	5–5 (1–4)	24 – Wong	9 – Wong	3 – Beverly	PNC Arena (0); Raleigh, NC
Jan 12, 2021; 7:00 p.m., ACCRSN		at Boston College	L 62–84	5–6 (1–5)	14 – Tied	8 – Timberlake	3 – Wong	Conte Forum (0); Chestnut Hill, MA
Jan 16, 2021; 8:00 p.m., ACCN		No. 16 Louisville	W 78–72	6–6 (2–5)	30 – Wong	11 – Brooks	6 – Wong	Watsco Center (0); Coral Gables, FL
Jan 19, 2021; 7:00 p.m., ACCN		at Syracuse	L 57–83	6–7 (2–6)	16 – Wong	6 – Brooks	3 – Beverly	Carrier Dome (0); Syracuse, NY
Jan 24, 2021; 6:00 p.m., ACCN		Notre Dame	L 59–73	6–8 (2–7)	20 – McGusty	5 – Olaniyi	3 – Tied	Watsco Center (0); Coral Gables, FL
Jan 27, 2021; 6:00 p.m., ACCN		at No. 16 Florida State	L 59–81	6–9 (2–8)	21 – Wong	5 – Brooks	3 – Tied	Donald L. Tucker Civic Center (2,825); Tallahassee, FL
Jan 30, 2021; 2:00 p.m., ACCN		at Wake Forest	L 54–66	6–10 (2–9)	17 – McGusty	7 – Tied	9 – Beverly	LJVM Coliseum (82); Winston-Salem, NC
Feb 1, 2021; 7:00 p.m., ESPN		Duke	W 77–75	7–10 (3–9)	21 – Olaniyi	7 – Olaniyi	3 – Tied	Watsco Center (0); Coral Gables, FL
Feb 6, 2021; 12:00 p.m., ACCRSN		No. 16 Virginia Tech	L 76–80 ^{OT}	7–11 (3–10)	19 – Tied	12 – Brooks	6 – Wong	Watsco Center (0); Coral Gables, FL
Feb 8, 2021; 7:00 p.m., ESPN		at North Carolina	Postponed due to COVID-19 issues					Dean Smith Center; Chapel Hill, NC
Feb 14, 2021; 6:00 p.m., ACCN		at Notre Dame	L 61–71	7–12 (3–11)	17 – Wong	10 – Tied	3 – Tied	Joyce Center (114); Notre Dame, IN
Feb 20, 2021; 12:00 p.m., ACCRSN		Georgia Tech	L 60–87	7–13 (3–12)	18 – Olaniyi	7 – Olaniyi	4 – Tied	Watsco Center (0); Coral Gables, FL
Feb 24, 2021; 8:30 p.m., ACCN		No. 11 Florida State	L 71–88	7–14 (3–13)	29 – Wong	7 – Walker	4 – McGusty	Watsco Center (0); Coral Gables, FL
Feb 27, 2021; 2:00 p.m., ACCRSN		at Clemson	L 58–66	7–15 (3–14)	28 – Wong	10 – Walker	7 – McGusty	Littlejohn Coliseum (1,876); Clemson, SC
Mar 1, 2021; 6:00 p.m., ACCN		at No. 21 Virginia	L 51–62	7–16 (3–15)	14 – McGusty	10 – Walker	2 – Wong	John Paul Jones Arena (0); Charlottesville, VA
Mar 5, 2021; 6:00 p.m., ACCN		Boston College	W 80–76	8–16 (4–15)	27 – McGusty	8 – Olaniyi	5 – Tied	Watsco Center (0); Coral Gables, FL
ACC tournament
Mar 9, 2021; 2:00 p.m., ACCN	(13)	vs. (12) Pittsburgh; First Round	W 79–73	9–16	20 – Wong	9 – Walker	4 – Tied	Greensboro Coliseum (2,820); Greensboro, NC
Mar 10, 2021; 2:30 p.m., ACCN	(13)	vs. (5) Clemson; Second Round	W 67–64	10–16	20 – Wong	7 – Wong	4 – McGusty	Greensboro Coliseum (2,820); Greensboro, NC
Mar 11, 2021; 2:30 p.m., ESPN2	(13)	vs. (4) Georgia Tech; Quarterfinals	L 66–70	10–17	25 – McGusty	7 – McGusty	4 – Wong	Greensboro Coliseum (2,820); Greensboro, NC
*Non-conference game. ^{#}Rankings from AP Poll. (#) Tournament seedings in parentheses. All times are in Eastern Time.

== Rankings ==
Ranking movements Legend: — = Not ranked
	Week																	
Poll	Pre	1	2	3	4	5	6	7	8	9	10	11	12	13	14	15	16	Final
AP	—	—	—	—	—	—	—	—	—	—	—	—	—	—	—	—	—	Not released
Coaches	—	—	—	—	—	—	—	—	—	—	—	—	—	—	—	—	—	—

*AP does not release post-NCAA Tournament rankings.
