= 2020–21 ASUN Conference men's basketball season =

- League: NCAA Division I
- Sport: Basketball
- Teams: 9

Regular season
- Champions: Liberty
- Season MVP: Darius McGhee, Liberty

Tournament
- Champions: Liberty
- Runners-up: North Alabama
- Finals MVP: Darius McGhee, Liberty

Atlantic Sun men's basketball seasons
- 2019–20 2021–22

2020–21 ASUN men's basketball standings
	Conf.				Overall
Team	W		L	PCT	W		L	PCT
Liberty †	11	–	2	.846	23	–	6	.793
Bellarmine *	10	–	3	.769	14	–	8	.636
Lipscomb	9	–	6	.600	15	–	12	.556
North Florida	6	–	6	.500	8	–	15	.348
North Alabama *	7	–	8	.467	13	–	11	.542
Florida Gulf Coast	4	–	5	.444	10	–	8	.556
Stetson	7	–	9	.438	12	–	15	.444
Jacksonville	5	–	9	.357	11	–	13	.458
Kennesaw State	2	–	13	.133	5	–	19	.208
† 2021 ASUN Tournament winner * ineligible for the 2021 NCAA tournament due to transition period Jacksonville suspended their season on February 26, 2021

The 2020–21 ASUN Conference men's basketball season began with practices in October 2020, followed by the start of the 2020–21 NCAA Division I men's basketball season in November. Conference play began in January 2021 and concluded in March 2021. It was the 43rd season of ASUN Conference basketball. This season was also the first ASUN season for Bellarmine, which started a transition from NCAA Division II when it joined the ASUN on July 1, 2020.

== Preseason awards ==
Preseason awards were announced by the league office on November 5, 2020.

=== Preseason men's basketball coaches poll ===
(First place votes in parentheses)

1. Lipscomb (5) 74
2. Liberty (2) 66
3. Stetson (1) 64
4. North Florida (1) 56
5. FGCU 45
6. North Alabama 40
7. Jacksonville 29
8. Bellarmine 18
9. Kennesaw State 13

=== Preseason men's basketball media poll ===
(First place votes in parentheses)

1. Lipscomb (16) 256
2. Liberty (10) 245
3. Stetson (4) 202
4. North Florida (2) 192
5. FGCU 156
6. North Alabama 146
7. Jacksonville 108
8. Kennesaw State 68
9. Bellarmine 62

=== Honors ===
- Preseason Player of the Year: Ahsan Asadullah, Lipscomb
- Preseason Defensive Player of the Year: Elijah Cuffee, Liberty
- Fan-Voted Preseason Player of the Year: Caleb Catto, FGCU
- Fan-Voted Preseason Defensive Player of the Year: Alex Peterson, Kennesaw State

== Conference matrix ==
	Bellarmine	Florida Gulf Coast	Jacksonville	Kennesaw State	Liberty	Lipscomb	North Alabama	North Florida	Stetson
vs. Bellarmine	—	0−2	0−2	0−2	1−0	2−0	0−2	0−0	0−2
vs. Florida Gulf Coast	2−0	—	0−0	1−0	0−0	1−1	0−2	0−0	1−1
vs. Jacksonville	2−0	0−0	—	0−2	2−0	1−1	2−0	1−1	1−1
vs. Kennesaw State	2−0	0−1	2−0	—	2−0	2−0	2−0	2−0	1−1
vs. Liberty	0−1	0−0	0−2	0−2	—	1−1	0−2	0–2	1–1
vs. Lipscomb	0–2	1–1	1–1	0–2	1–1	—	–0	1–1	1–1
vs. North Alabama	2–0	2–0	0–2	0–2	2–0	0–1	—	1–1	1–1
vs. North Florida	0–0	0–0	1–1	0–2	2–0	1–1	1–1	—	1–1
vs. Stetson	2–0	1–1	1–1	1–1	1–1	1–1	1–1	1–1	—
Total	10−3	4−5	5−9	2−13	11−2	9−6	7−8	6−6	7−9

== All-ASUN awards ==
=== ASUN weekly awards ===
Week	Player(s) of the Week	School	Newcomer of the Week	School
Nov 30	Darius McGhee	Liberty	Romeao Ferguson	Lipscomb
Dec 7	Keegan McDowell	Liberty	Dontarius James	Jacksonville
Dec 14	Caleb Catto	FGCU	Dontarius James	Jacksonville
Dec 21	Emmanuel Littles & Rob Perry	North Alabama & Stetson	Chase Johnston	Stetson
Dec 28	Cyrus Largie	FGCU	Eli Abaev	FGCU
Jan 4	Kevion Nolan	Jacksonville	Kevion Nolan	Jacksonville
Jan 11	Dontarius James	Jacksonville	Dontarius James	Jacksonville
Jan 19	Ethan Claycomb	Bellarmine	Romeao Ferguson	Lipscomb
Jan 25	Mervin James	North Alabama	Jose Placer	North Florida
Feb 1	Rob Perry	Stetson	Jose Placer	North Florida
Feb 8	Pedro Bradshaw & Jalen Warren	Bellarmine & FGCU	Romeao Ferguson	Lipscomb
Feb 15	Ahsan Asadullah	Lipscomb	Dontarius James	Jacksonville
Feb 22	Bryce Workman	Jacksonville	Romeao Ferguson	Lipscomb
Feb 28	Darius McGhee & Christiaan Jones	Liberty & Stetson	Josh Berenbaum	North Florida

=== End-of-season awards ===
Honor	Recipient
Player of the Year	Darius McGhee, Liberty
Coach of the Year	Ritchie McKay, Liberty
Defensive Player of the Year	Elijah Coffee, Liberty
Newcomer of the Year	Romeao Ferguson, Lipscomb
Freshman of the Year	Chase Johnston, Stetson
All-ASUN First Team	Darius McGhee, Liberty
All-ASUN First Team	Ahsan Asadullah, Lipscomb
All-ASUN First Team	Pedro Bradshaw, Bellarmine
All-ASUN First Team	Dylan Penn, Bellarmine
All-ASUN First Team	Carter Hendricksen, North Florida
All-ASUN Second Team	Dontarius James, Jacksonville
All-ASUN Second Team	Elijah Coffee, Liberty
All-ASUN Second Team	Romaeo Ferguson, Lipscomb
All-ASUN Second Team	Mervin James, North Alabama
All-ASUN Second Team	Jose Placer, North Florida
All-ASUN Freshmen Team	Chase Johnston, Stetson
All-ASUN Freshmen Team	Chris Youngblood, Kennesaw State
All-ASUN Freshmen Team	Detalian Brown, North Alabama
All-ASUN Freshmen Team	Jonathan Aybar, North Florida
All-ASUN Freshmen Team	Josh Smith, Stetson
