= 2020–21 Kennesaw State Owls men's basketball team =

American college basketball season

2020–21 Kennesaw State Owls men's basketball
- Conference: Atlantic Sun Conference
- Record: 5–19 (2–13 ASUN)
- Head coach: Amir Abdur-Rahim (2nd season)
- Associate head coach: Ben Fletcher
- Assistant coaches: Pershin Williams; Tanner Smith
- Home arena: KSU Convocation Center

2020–21 ASUN men's basketball standings
	Conf.				Overall
Team	W		L	PCT	W		L	PCT
Liberty †	11	–	2	.846	23	–	6	.793
Bellarmine *	10	–	3	.769	14	–	8	.636
Lipscomb	9	–	6	.600	15	–	12	.556
North Florida	6	–	6	.500	8	–	15	.348
North Alabama *	7	–	8	.467	13	–	11	.542
Florida Gulf Coast	4	–	5	.444	10	–	8	.556
Stetson	7	–	9	.438	12	–	15	.444
Jacksonville	5	–	9	.357	11	–	13	.458
Kennesaw State	2	–	13	.133	5	–	19	.208
† 2021 ASUN Tournament winner * ineligible for the 2021 NCAA tournament due to transition period Jacksonville suspended their season on February 26, 2021

The 2020–21 Kennesaw State Owls men's basketball team represented Kennesaw State University in the 2020–21 NCAA Division I men's basketball season. The Owls, led by 2nd-year head coach Amir Abdur-Rahim, played their home games at the KSU Convocation Center in Kennesaw, Georgia as members of the Atlantic Sun Conference. They finished the season 5-19, 2-13 in ASUN Play to finish in last place. They lost in the quarterfinals of the ASUN tournament to Liberty.

== Previous season ==
The Owls finished the 2019–20 season 1–28, 0–16 in ASUN play to finish in last place. In turn, they failed to qualify for the ASUN tournament.

== Roster ==
2020–21 Kennesaw State Owls men's basketball team
Players
Coaches

Pos.	#	Name	Height	Weight	Year	Previous school	Hometown
G	0	Glenn Robinson II	6 ft 5 in (1.96 m)	195 lb (88 kg)	Sr	Coastal Alabama CC	Atlanta, GA
G	1	Terrell Burden	5 ft 10 in (1.78 m)	160 lb (73 kg)	So	Campbell HS	Smyrna, GA
F	2	Nate Springs	6 ft 10 in (2.08 m)	215 lb (98 kg)	RS So	Ohio	Charlotte, NC
G	3	Chris Youngblood	6 ft 4 in (1.93 m)	212 lb (96 kg)	Fr	East Coweta HS	Sharpsburg, GA
F	4	Cole LaRue	6 ft 9 in (2.06 m)	238 lb (108 kg)	Fr	McGill–Toolen HS	Mobile, AL
G	5	Brandon Stroud	6 ft 6 in (1.98 m)	196 lb (89 kg)	Fr	East Coweta HS	Atlanta, GA
F	10	Alex Peterson	6 ft 7 in (2.01 m)	217 lb (98 kg)	Jr	Missouri State–West Plains	Tappahannock, VA
F	11	Demetrius Rives	6 ft 4 in (1.93 m)	197 lb (89 kg)	Fr	Tri-Cities HS	East Point, GA
G	12	Jamie Lewis	6 ft 4 in (1.93 m)	191 lb (87 kg)	RS So	Wake Forest	Atlanta, GA
G	13	Kasen Jennings	6 ft 3 in (1.91 m)	196 lb (89 kg)	Fr	Langston Hughes HS	Newnan, GA
F	15	Mayson Quartlebaum	6 ft 6 in (1.98 m)	240 lb (109 kg)	Fr	Lawrence HS	Lawrence, KS
F	21	Armani Harris	6 ft 6 in (1.98 m)	199 lb (90 kg)	So	Newton HS	Covington, GA
G	22	Spencer Rodgers	6 ft 4 in (1.93 m)	178 lb (81 kg)	Jr	Southwest Mississippi CC	Lawrenceville, GA
F	23	Antonio Spencer	6 ft 9 in (2.06 m)	233 lb (106 kg)	RS Jr	Duncanville HS	Dallas, TX
G	24	Kenny Burns	6 ft 2 in (1.88 m)	169 lb (77 kg)	Fr	Wheeler HS	Los Angeles, CA

Head coach

- Amir Abdur-Rahim (Southeastern Louisiana)

Assistant coach(es)

- Ben Fletcher (Troy)
- Pershin Williams (North Florida)
- Tanner Smith (Clemson)

Legend

- (C) Team captain
- (S) Suspended
- (I) Ineligible
- (W) Walk-on
- Injured
- Current redshirt

Roster
Last update: November 27, 2020

== Schedule and results ==
Date time, TV	Rank^{#}	Opponent^{#}	Result	Record	Site (attendance) city, state
Non-conference regular season
November 25, 2020*; 4:00 pm		Carver	W 87–40	1–0	KSU Convocation Center (287); Kennesaw, GA
November 28, 2020*; 4:00 pm, ESPN+		Toccoa Falls	W 106–44	2–0	KSU Convocation Center (302); Kennesaw, Georgia
December 2, 2020*; 7:30 pm		at UAB	L 48–73	2–1	Bartow Arena (820); Birmingham, AL
December 4, 2020*; 5:00 pm, FS1		at No. 9 Creighton	L 58–93	2–2	CHI Health Center Omaha (201); Omaha, NE
December 12, 2020*; 2:00 pm, ESPN+		Dalton State	W 72–62	3–2	KSU Convocation Center (231); Kennesaw, GA
December 16, 2020*; 7:30 pm		at Belmont	L 53–64	3–3	Curb Event Center; Nashville, TN
December 19, 2020*; 4:30 pm		Samford	L 63–65	3–4	KSU Convocation Center; Kennesaw, GA
December 22, 2020*; 2:00 pm		Mercer	L 71–81	3–5	KSU Convocation Center (341); Kennesaw, GA
Atlantic Sun Conference regular season
January 1, 2021; 6:00 pm, ESPN+		Jacksonville	L 57–62	3–6 (0–1)	KSU Convocation Center (229); Kennesaw, GA
January 2, 2021; 4:00 pm, ESPN+		Jacksonville	L 66–72	3–7 (0–2)	KSU Convocation Center (215); Kennesaw, GA
January 22, 2021; 7:00 pm, ESPN+		at Liberty	L 63–69	3–8 (0–3)	Liberty Arena (250); Lynchburg, VA
January 23, 2021; 6:00 pm, ESPN+		at Liberty	L 47–76	3–9 (0–4)	Liberty Arena (250); Lynchburg, VA
January 15, 2021; 6:00 pm, ESPN+		North Alabama	L 43–66	3–10 (0–5)	KSU Convocation Center (387); Kennesaw, GA
January 16, 2021; 4:00 pm, ESPN+		North Alabama	L 64–66	3–11 (0–6)	KSU Convocation Center (348); Kennesaw, GA
January 22, 2021; 7:00 pm, ESPN+		at North Florida	L 54–69	3–12 (0–7)	UNF Arena (787); Jacksonville, FL
January 23, 2021; 5:00 pm, ESPN+		at North Florida	L 65–68	3–13 (0–8)	UNF Arena (703); Jacksonville, FL
January 29, 2021; 6:00 pm, ESPN+		Bellarmine	L 67–84	3–14 (0–9)	KSU Convocation Center (388); Kennesaw, GA
January 30, 2021; 4:00 pm, ESPN+		Bellarmine	L 79–84	3–15 (0–10)	KSU Convocation Center (332); Kennesaw, GA
February 12, 2021; 6:00 pm, ESPN+		Stetson	L 61–74	3–16 (0–11)	KSU Convocation Center (354); Kennesaw, GA
February 13, 2021; 4:00 pm, ESPN+		Stetson	W 83–75	4–16 (1–11)	KSU Convocation Center (358); Kennesaw, GA
February 19, 2021; 8:00 pm, ESPN+		at Lipscomb	L 62–76	4–17 (1–12)	Allen Arena (943); Nashville, TN
February 20, 2021; 8:00 pm, ESPN+		at Lipscomb	L 63–77	4–18 (1–13)	Allen Arena (984); Nashville, TN
February 26, 2021; 6:00 pm		vs. Florida Gulf Coast	W 80–63	5–18 (2–13)	Eagles' Nest; Marietta, GA
February 27, 2021; 6:00 pm		Florida Gulf Coast	Canceled		KSU Convocation Center; Kennesaw, GA
Atlantic Sun tournament
March 4, 2021; 2:00 pm, ESPN+	(8)	vs. (1) Liberty; Quarterfinals	L 59–69	5–19	Swisher Gymnasium; Jacksonville, FL
*Non-conference game. ^{#}Rankings from AP Poll. (#) Tournament seedings in parentheses. All times are in Eastern.
