= 2020–21 Stetson Hatters men's basketball team =

American college basketball season

2020–21 Stetson Hatters men's basketball
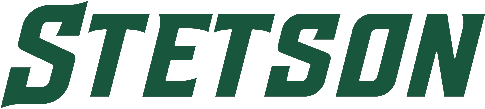

CBI, semifinals
- Conference: Atlantic Sun Conference
- Record: 12–15 (7–9 ASUN)
- Head coach: Donnie Jones (2nd season)
- Assistant coaches: Jonathan Mitchell; Adam Williams
- Home arena: Edmunds Center

2020–21 ASUN men's basketball standings
	Conf.				Overall
Team	W		L	PCT	W		L	PCT
Liberty †	11	–	2	.846	23	–	6	.793
Bellarmine *	10	–	3	.769	14	–	8	.636
Lipscomb	9	–	6	.600	15	–	12	.556
North Florida	6	–	6	.500	8	–	15	.348
North Alabama *	7	–	8	.467	13	–	11	.542
Florida Gulf Coast	4	–	5	.444	10	–	8	.556
Stetson	7	–	9	.438	12	–	15	.444
Jacksonville	5	–	9	.357	11	–	13	.458
Kennesaw State	2	–	13	.133	5	–	19	.208
† 2021 ASUN Tournament winner * ineligible for the 2021 NCAA tournament due to transition period Jacksonville suspended their season on February 26, 2021

The 2020–21 Stetson Hatters men's basketball team represented Stetson University in the 2020–21 NCAA Division I men's basketball season. The Hatters, led by second-year head coach Donnie Jones, played their home games at the Edmunds Center in DeLand, Florida as members of the Atlantic Sun Conference (ASUN). They finished the season 12–15, 7–9 in ASUN play, to finish in 7th place. They defeated Bellarmine in the quarterfinals of the Atlantic Sun tournament before losing in the semifinals to Liberty. They received an invitation to the CBI where they defeated Bowling Green in the quarterfinals before losing in the semifinals to Coastal Carolina.

== Previous season ==
The Hatters finished the 2019–20 season 16–17, 9–7 in ASUN play, to finish in a tie for third place. As the #4 seed in the ASUN tournament, the Hatters defeated the #5 seed North Alabama in the quarterfinals, 82–72, before falling to the top seed and eventual champions, Liberty, in the semifinals, 62–66.

== Roster ==
2020–21 Stetson Hatters men's basketball team
Players
Coaches

Pos.	#	Name	Height	Weight	Year	Previous school	Hometown
G	0	Christiaan Jones	6 ft 5 in (1.96 m)	195 lb (88 kg)	Sr	Cardinal Newman High School	Columbia, SC
G/F	1	Wheza Panzo	6 ft 7 in (2.01 m)	210 lb (95 kg)	So	The Potter's House (FL)	Mississauga, ON
G	2	Rob Perry	6 ft 4 in (1.93 m)	210 lb (95 kg)	So	4A Sports Academy	Orlando, FL
G	4	Keith Lamar	6 ft 6 in (1.98 m)	190 lb (86 kg)	Fr	Eagle's Landing High School	Stockbridge, GA
G	5	Giancarlo Valdez	6 ft 3 in (1.91 m)	170 lb (77 kg)	Fr	Decatur Heritage Christian Academy	Santo Domingo, Dominican Republic
G	11	Chase Johnston	6 ft 2 in (1.88 m)	185 lb (84 kg)	RS Fr	Purdue Fort Wayne	Boca Raton, FL
F	12	Josh Smith	6 ft 8 in (2.03 m)	215 lb (98 kg)	Fr	Monrovia High School	Monrovia, IN
F/C	15	Mahamadou Diawara	6 ft 10 in (2.08 m)	249 lb (113 kg)	So	Massanutten Military Academy	Bamako, Mali
G	22	Davante Robinson	6 ft 0 in (1.83 m)	190 lb (86 kg)	So	Destiny Christian School	Oklahoma City, OK
G	30	Stephan D. Swenson	6 ft 2 in (1.88 m)	195 lb (88 kg)	Fr	Westminster Academy	Brussels, Belgium
F/C	32	Gabriel Wuor	7 ft 1 in (2.16 m)	215 lb (98 kg)	Fr	Wesley Christian Academy	Duk Padiet, South Sudan
F	33	Wyatt Hollmann	6 ft 7 in (2.01 m)	210 lb (95 kg)	RS So	Embry–Riddle	DeLand, FL
F	35	Joel Kabimba	6 ft 8 in (2.03 m)	210 lb (95 kg)	So	Middleburg Academy	Kinshasa, DR Congo

Head coach

- Donnie Jones (Pikeville)

Assistant coach(es)

- Jonathan Mitchell (Rutgers)
- Adam Williams (Marshall)

Legend

- (C) Team captain
- (S) Suspended
- (I) Ineligible
- (W) Walk-on
- Injured
- Current redshirt

Roster
Last update: November 29, 2020

== Schedule and results ==
Date time, TV	Rank^{#}	Opponent^{#}	Result	Record	Site (attendance) city, state
Non-conference regular season
November 30, 2020*; 7:00 p.m., ESPN+		Emmanuel College	L 61–64	0–1	Edmunds Center; DeLand, FL
December 4, 2020*; 8:00 p.m., ACCNX		at Miami (FL)	L 60–82	0–2	Watsco Center; Coral Gables, FL
December 6, 2020*; 2:00 p.m., SECN		at Florida	L 40–86	0–3	O'Connell Center (2,193); Gainesville, FL
December 8, 2020*; 5:00 p.m., ESPN+		at South Florida	L 62–73	0–4	Yuengling Center; Tampa, FL
December 15, 2020*; 7:00 p.m., ESPN+		Florida Atlantic	W 78–69	1–4	Edmunds Center; DeLand, FL
December 18, 2020*; 7:00 p.m., ESPN+		Thomas	Canceled due to COVID-19 issues		Edmunds Center; DeLand, FL
December 19, 2020*; 6:00 p.m., ESPN+		Carver	W 95–51	2–4	Edmunds Center; DeLand, FL
Atlantic Sun Conference regular season
January 1, 2021; 7:00 p.m., ESPN+		North Florida	Postponed due to COVID-19 issues		Edmunds Center; DeLand, FL
January 2, 2021; 5:00 p.m., ESPN+		North Florida	Postponed due to COVID-19 issues		Edmunds Center; DeLand, FL
January 8, 2021; 7:00 p.m., ESPN+		at North Alabama	W 86–77	3–4 (1–0)	Flowers Hall (392); Florence, AL
January 9, 2021; 7:00 p.m., ESPN+		at North Alabama	L 66–73	3–5 (1–1)	Flowers Hall (368); Florence, AL
January 15, 2021; 7:00 p.m., ESPN+		Liberty	W 65–59	4–5 (2–1)	Edmunds Center (50); DeLand, FL
January 16, 2021; 5:00 p.m., ESPN+		Liberty	L 58–68	4–6 (2–2)	Edmunds Center (50); DeLand, FL
January 22, 2021; 7:00 p.m., ESPN+		at Bellarmine	L 62–67	4–7 (2–3)	Freedom Hall (782); Louisville, KY
January 23, 2021; 5:00 p.m., ESPN+		at Bellarmine	L 65–76	4–8 (2–4)	Freedom Hall (775); Louisville, KY
January 29, 2021; 7:00 p.m., ESPN+		Lipscomb	Postponed due to COVID-19 issues		Edmunds Center; DeLand, FL
January 30, 2021; 5:00 p.m., ESPN+		Lipscomb	Postponed due to COVID-19 issues		Edmunds Center; DeLand, FL
January 29, 2021; 7:00 p.m., ESPN+		at Florida Gulf Coast	L 63–64	4–9 (2–5)	Alico Arena (878); Fort Myers, FL
January 30, 2021; 7:00 p.m., ESPN+		at Florida Gulf Coast	W 77–66	5–9 (3–5)	Alico Arena; Fort Myers, FL
February 1, 2021; 6:00 p.m., ESPN+		Carver College	W 110–56	6–9	Edmunds Center; DeLand, Florida
February 5, 2021; 7:00 p.m., ESPN+		Lipscomb	W 73–68	7–9 (4–5)	Edmunds Center; DeLand, FL
February 6, 2021; 7:00 p.m., ESPN+		Lipscomb	L 61–69	7–10 (4–6)	Edmunds Center; DeLand, FL
February 12, 2021; 6:00 p.m., ESPN+		at Kennesaw State	W 74–61	8–10 (5–6)	KSU Convocation Center (354); Kennesaw, GA
February 13, 2021; 5:00 p.m., ESPN+		at Kennesaw State	L 75–83	8–11 (5–7)	KSU Convocation Center (358); Kennesaw, GA
February 19, 2021; 7:00 p.m., ESPN+		Jacksonville	W 91–75	9–11 (6–7)	Edmunds Center (50); DeLand, FL
February 20, 2021; 7:00 p.m., ESPN+		Jacksonville	L 82–86	9–12 (6–8)	Edmunds Center (50); DeLand, FL
February 26, 2021; 2:00 p.m., ESPN+		North Florida	L 74–79	9–13 (6–9)	Edmunds Center; DeLand, FL
February 27, 2021; 2:00 p.m., ESPN+		North Florida	W 85–68	10–13 (7–9)	Edmunds Center; DeLand, FL
Atlantic Sun tournament
March 4, 2021; 7:00 p.m., ESPN+	(7)	vs. (2) Bellarmine; Quarterfinals	W 73–70	11–13	UNF Arena; Jacksonville, FL
March 5, 2021; 2:00 p.m., ESPN+	(7)	vs. (1) Liberty; Semifinals	L 64–77	11–14	UNF Arena; Jacksonville, FL
CBI
March 22, 2021; 11:30 a.m., FloSports		vs. Bowling Green; Quarterfinals	W 53–52	12–14	Ocean Center; Daytona Beach, FL
March 23, 2021; 5:30 p.m., FloSports		vs. Coastal Carolina; Semifinals	L 72–77 ^{OT}	12–15	Ocean Center; Daytona Beach, FL
*Non-conference game. ^{#}Rankings from AP poll. (#) Tournament seedings in parentheses. All times are in Eastern.
