= 2020–21 Bellarmine Knights men's basketball team =

American college basketball season

2020–21 Bellarmine Knights men's basketball
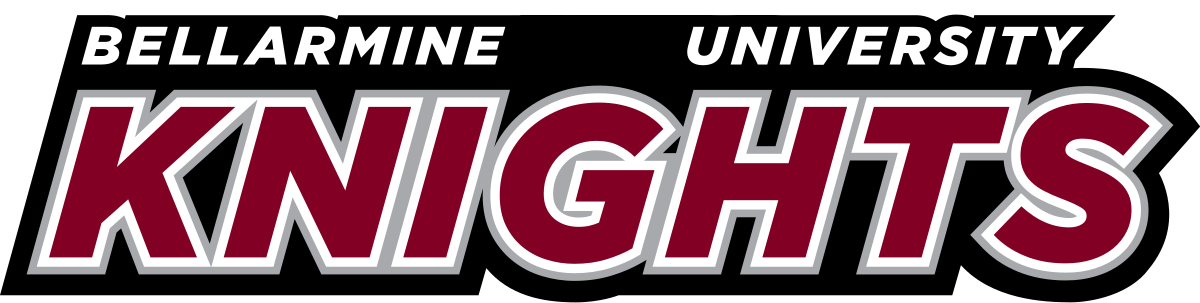

CBI, semifinals
- Conference: ASUN Conference
- Record: 14–8 (10–3 ASUN)
- Head coach: Scott Davenport (16th season)
- Assistant coaches: Doug Davenport; Beau Braden; Al Davis
- Home arena: Freedom Hall

2020–21 ASUN men's basketball standings
	Conf.				Overall
Team	W		L	PCT	W		L	PCT
Liberty †	11	–	2	.846	23	–	6	.793
Bellarmine *	10	–	3	.769	14	–	8	.636
Lipscomb	9	–	6	.600	15	–	12	.556
North Florida	6	–	6	.500	8	–	15	.348
North Alabama *	7	–	8	.467	13	–	11	.542
Florida Gulf Coast	4	–	5	.444	10	–	8	.556
Stetson	7	–	9	.438	12	–	15	.444
Jacksonville	5	–	9	.357	11	–	13	.458
Kennesaw State	2	–	13	.133	5	–	19	.208
† 2021 ASUN Tournament winner * ineligible for the 2021 NCAA tournament due to transition period Jacksonville suspended their season on February 26, 2021

The 2020–21 Bellarmine Knights men's basketball team represented Bellarmine University in the 2020–21 NCAA Division I men's basketball season. The Knights, led by 16th-year head coach Scott Davenport, played their home games at Freedom Hall in Louisville, Kentucky as members of the ASUN Conference. They finished the season 14–8 and 10–3 in ASUN play to finish in second place in the conference. They earned the second seed in the ASUN tournament, losing in the quarterfinals to Stetson. They were invited to the College Basketball Invitational (the program's first ever Division I postseason event), where they defeated Army in the quarterfinals and lost to Pepperdine in the semifinals.

The season marked Bellarmine's first year of a four-year transition period from Division II to Division I. As a result, the Knights were not eligible for NCAA postseason play but were allowed to participate in the ASUN Tournament.

== Previous season ==
The Knights finished the 2019–20 season with a 20–8 overall record, including a 13–7 mark in GLVC play to finish in fifth place. It was a turbulent season for the team to say the least. They began the season 14–0, and had earned a number one overall ranking in the Division II Top 25 polls. After falling at home in a heartbreaking overtime loss to Indianapolis, 81–76, the Knights never quite found their dominant footing again. They lost six of their next eight games, including one to annual GLVC bottom feeder William Jewell. With the losing skid, the Knights fell out of the rankings all together and were faced with a tough climb to even make the NCAA Tournament. They won three of their final four games to close out the regular season. As the 5th seed in the 2020 GLVC tournament, they were defeated by No. 4 seeded Southern Indiana in the quarterfinals, 76–73. They received the 5 seed in the Midwest Region of the NCAA DII tournament. But, like many sporting events, the tournament was cancelled due to the ongoing COVID-19 pandemic.

== Roster ==
2020–21 Bellarmine Knights men's basketball team
Players
Coaches

Pos.	#	Name	Height	Weight	Year	Previous school	Hometown
F	0	Ethan Claycomb	6 ft 7 in (2.01 m)	205 lb (93 kg)	Sr	Indiana State	Vincennes, Indiana
G	1	Juston Betz	6 ft 3 in (1.91 m)	190 lb (86 kg)	RS Jr	Providence High School	New Albany, Indiana
G	2	Alec Pfriem	6 ft 5 in (1.96 m)	205 lb (93 kg)	So	Moeller High School	Cincinnati, Ohio
G	3	Zac Jennings	6 ft 5 in (1.96 m)	205 lb (93 kg)	Fr	Cooper High School	Burlington, Kentucky
G	10	Garrett Tipton	6 ft 4 in (1.93 m)	195 lb (88 kg)	RS So	Bishop Hartley High School	Columbus, Ohio
G	13	Dylan Penn	6 ft 3 in (1.91 m)	190 lb (86 kg)	Jr	Reitz Memorial High School	Evansville, Indiana
F	14	Sam DeVault	6 ft 10 in (2.08 m)	220 lb (100 kg)	So	Austin Peay	Evansville, Indiana
G	22	Bash Wieland	6 ft 6 in (1.98 m)	205 lb (93 kg)	So	Lakota East High School	Cincinnati, Ohio
G	23	Hunter Brogan	6 ft 4 in (1.93 m)	185 lb (84 kg)	Fr	Bullitt East High School	Mount Washington, Kentucky
F	24	Eli Roberts	6 ft 7 in (2.01 m)	220 lb (100 kg)	Fr	Manual High School	Louisville, Kentucky
G	25	CJ Fleming	6 ft 0 in (1.83 m)	180 lb (82 kg)	Sr	La Salle High School	Cincinnati, Ohio
F	30	Nick Thelen	6 ft 7 in (2.01 m)	217 lb (98 kg)	So	Covington Catholic High School	Edgewood, Kentucky
G	32	Pedro Bradshaw	6 ft 7 in (2.01 m)	185 lb (84 kg)	Jr	Eastern Kentucky	Russellville, Kentucky
C	33	Baylor Younker	6 ft 10 in (2.08 m)	220 lb (100 kg)	RS So	Grace Christian Academy (TN)	Knoxville, Tennessee
G	34	Drew Comer	6 ft 4 in (1.93 m)	185 lb (84 kg)	RS Fr	Greensburg High School	Greensburg, Indiana

Head coach

- Scott Davenport (Louisville)

Assistant coach(es)

- Doug Davenport (Bellarmine)
- Beau Braden (Centre)
- Al Davis (Bellarmine)

Legend

- (C) Team captain
- (S) Suspended
- (I) Ineligible
- (W) Walk-on
- Injured
- Current redshirt

Roster
Last update: November 26, 2020

== Schedule and results ==
Bellarmine was scheduled to begin their season on November 25 on the road against Chattanooga, but due to "unforeseen circumstances", this game, along with their home opener on November 28 against Transylvania, and their game on December 1 against Dayton, were postponed. Their game against Chattanooga was rescheduled for December 9, at home, and their game against Transylvania was rescheduled for January 1, 2021. Their game against Dayton was canceled.

After a preseason shutdown due to the COVID-19 pandemic, the Knights ended up playing their first game at the Division I level on the road against the sixth-ranked Duke Blue Devils. It was a historic night for the program albeit in a quieter than usual Cameron Indoor Stadium. Despite staying close for the first half, Bellarmine ended up falling short to Duke, 76–54. Junior guard Dylan Penn entered the history books during the game, as he was responsible for scoring the first ever points in Bellarmine's history at the Division I level.

Two days after the loss to Duke, Bellarmine made a different kind of history for the program, which was undoubtedly more positive. On December 6, 2020, the Knights traveled to the doorsteps of Howard University and dismantled the Bison, 84–63, to notch their first ever win at the Division I level. Sophomore guard Alec Pfriem came off the bench and notched the program's first ever double-double in Division I, scoring 14 points and grabbing 14 rebounds. The double-double was also the first of Pfriem's collegiate career.

The Knights entered ASUN play with a 3–3 record, including losses to high-profile ACC opponents in Duke and Notre Dame. After narrowly being swept at home by preseason conference favorite Lipscomb, the Knights got back to playing their brand of basketball. They went on the road and swept Florida Gulf Coast in a dominant two-day set, behind the contributions of senior forward Ethan Claycomb. He was named ASUN Player of the Week, becoming the first Bellarmine athlete in any sport to earn such an honor during the Knights' brief ASUN history.

The Knights continued their success at home in the following weekend against Stetson, pulling off comeback wins on back-to-back nights to extend their winning streak to four. The second win was particularly special, however, as the Knights pulled off an unbelievable comeback. Trailing by 20 with less than 19 minutes to go in the game, Bellarmine shot 84 percent from the field in the second half (21 of 25) en route to rallying past the Hatters for a 76–65 victory.

Bellarmine continued their winning streak over the next few weeks, sweeping Kennesaw State, Jacksonville, and North Alabama to get to a 10–2 record in ASUN play, which placed them at the top of the conference.

Date time, TV	Rank^{#}	Opponent^{#}	Result	Record	Site (attendance) city, state
Non-conference regular season
December 4, 2020*; 7:00 pm, FS South		at No. 6 Duke	L 54–76	0–1	Cameron Indoor Stadium (0); Durham, NC
December 6, 2020*; 6:00 pm, ESPN+		at Howard	W 84–63	1–1	Burr Gymnasium (0); Washington, DC
December 9, 2020*; 7:00 pm, ESPN+		Chattanooga	L 68–77	1–2	Freedom Hall (853); Louisville, KY
December 13, 2020*; 1:00 pm		at Morgan State	Canceled		Talmadge L. Hill Field House; Baltimore, MD
December 19, 2020*; 2:00 pm, ESPN+		Middle Tennessee	Canceled		Freedom Hall; Louisville, KY
December 22, 2020*; TBA		at Middle Tennessee	Canceled		Murphy Center; Murfreesboro, TN
December 23, 2020*; 12:00 pm		at Notre Dame	L 70–81	1–3	Purcell Pavilion (82); South Bend, IN
January 1, 2021*; 7:00 pm, ESPN+		Transylvania	W 90–40	2–3	Freedom Hall (537); Louisville, KY
January 2, 2021*; 2:00 pm, ESPN+		Mount St. Joseph	W 90–38	3–3	Freedom Hall (479); Louisville, KY
ASUN Conference regular season
January 8, 2021; 7:00 pm, ESPN+		Lipscomb	L 72–77	3–4 (0–1)	Freedom Hall (1,056); Louisville, KY
January 9, 2021; 5:00 pm, ESPN+		Lipscomb	L 58–65	3–5 (0–2)	Freedom Hall (749); Louisville, KY
January 15, 2021; 7:00 pm, ESPN+		at Florida Gulf Coast	W 74–60	4–5 (1–2)	Alico Arena (1,000); Fort Myers, FL
January 16, 2021; 7:00 pm, ESPN+		at Florida Gulf Coast	W 80–63	5–5 (2–2)	Alico Arena (931); Fort Myers, FL
January 22, 2021; 7:00 pm, ESPN+		Stetson	W 67–62	6–5 (3–2)	Freedom Hall (782); Louisville, KY
January 23, 2021; 5:00 pm, ESPN+		Stetson	W 76–65	7–5 (4–2)	Freedom Hall (775); Louisville, KY
January 29, 2021; 7:00 pm, ESPN+		at Kennesaw State	W 84–67	8–5 (5–2)	KSU Convocation Center (388); Kennesaw, GA
January 30, 2021; 2:00 pm, ESPN+		at Kennesaw State	W 84–79	9–5 (6–2)	KSU Convocation Center (332); Kennesaw, GA
February 5, 2021; 7:00 pm, ESPN+		Jacksonville	W 71–56	10–5 (7–2)	Freedom Hall (1,285); Louisville, KY
February 6, 2021; 5:00 pm, ESPN+		Jacksonville	W 63–44	11–5 (8–2)	Freedom Hall (783); Louisville, KY
February 12, 2021; 7:00 pm, ESPN+		at North Alabama	W 66–64	12–5 (9–2)	Flowers Hall (283); Florence, AL
February 13, 2021; 7:00 pm, ESPN+		at North Alabama	W 87–63	13–5 (10–2)	Flowers Hall (317); Florence, AL
February 19, 2021; 7:00 pm, ESPN+		at North Florida	Canceled		UNF Arena; Jacksonville, FL
February 20, 2021; 5:00 pm, ESPN+		at North Florida	Canceled		UNF Arena; Jacksonville, FL
February 26, 2021; TBA, ESPN+		Liberty	Postponed		Freedom Hall; Louisville, KY
February 27, 2021; 12:00 pm, ESPNU		Liberty	L 78–94	13–6 (10–3)	Freedom Hall (2,737); Louisville, KY
ASUN tournament
March 4, 2021; 7:00 pm, ESPN+	(2)	vs. (7) Stetson; Quarterfinals	L 70–73	13–7	UNF Arena (268); Jacksonville, FL
CBI
March 22, 2021; 8:30 pm, FloSports		vs. Army; Quarterfinals	W 77–67	14–7	Ocean Center (601); Daytona Beach, FL
March 23, 2021; 8:00 pm, FloSports		vs. Pepperdine; Semifinals	L 71–82	14–8	Ocean Center (286); Daytona Beach, FL
*Non-conference game. ^{#}Rankings from AP Poll. (#) Tournament seedings in parentheses. All times are in Eastern.
