= 2020–21 Florida Gulf Coast Eagles men's basketball team =

American college basketball season

2020–21 Florida Gulf Coast Eagles men's basketball
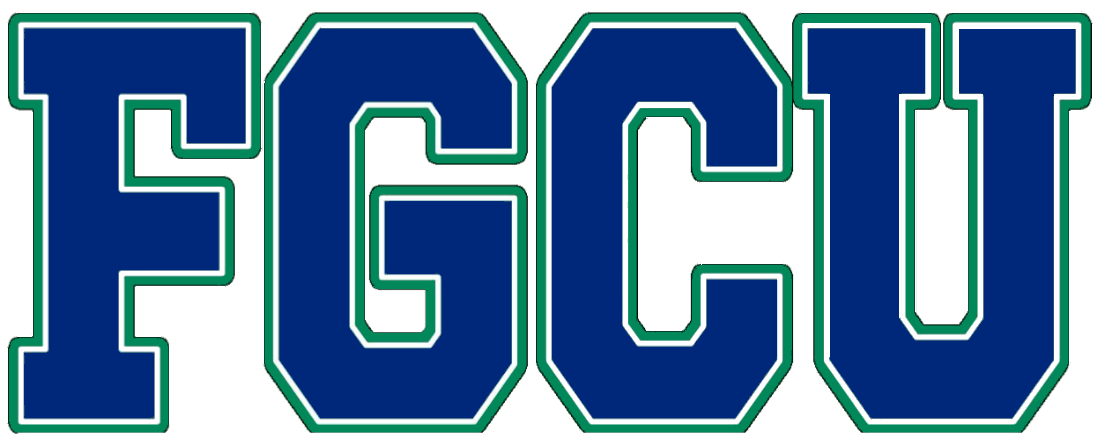
- Conference: Atlantic Sun Conference
- Record: 10–8 (4–5 ASUN)
- Head coach: Michael Fly (3rd season)
- Associate head coach: Donnie Marsh (3rd season)
- Assistant coaches: Justin Furr (3rd season); Joey Cantens (3rd season)
- Home arena: Alico Arena

2020–21 ASUN men's basketball standings
	Conf.				Overall
Team	W		L	PCT	W		L	PCT
Liberty †	11	–	2	.846	23	–	6	.793
Bellarmine *	10	–	3	.769	14	–	8	.636
Lipscomb	9	–	6	.600	15	–	12	.556
North Florida	6	–	6	.500	8	–	15	.348
North Alabama *	7	–	8	.467	13	–	11	.542
Florida Gulf Coast	4	–	5	.444	10	–	8	.556
Stetson	7	–	9	.438	12	–	15	.444
Jacksonville	5	–	9	.357	11	–	13	.458
Kennesaw State	2	–	13	.133	5	–	19	.208
† 2021 ASUN Tournament winner * ineligible for the 2021 NCAA tournament due to transition period Jacksonville suspended their season on February 26, 2021

The 2020–21 Florida Gulf Coast Eagles men's basketball team represented Florida Gulf Coast University in the 2020–21 NCAA Division I men's basketball season. The Eagles, led by third-year head coach Michael Fly, played their home games at Alico Arena in Fort Myers, Florida as members of the Atlantic Sun Conference. They finished the season 10-8, 4-5 in ASUN Play to finish in 6th place. They defeated Lipscomb in the quarterfinals of the ASUN tournament before losing in the semifinals to North Alabama.

== Previous season ==
The Eagles finished the 2019–20 season 10–22, 7–9 in ASUN Play to finish in a tie for sixth place. They lost in the quarterfinals of the ASUN tournament to Lipscomb.

== Roster ==
2020–21 Florida Gulf Coast Eagles men's basketball team
Players
Coaches

Pos.	#	Name	Height	Weight	Year	Previous school	Hometown
F	0	Dakota Rivers	6 ft 8 in (2.03 m)	208 lb (94 kg)	So	Windermere High School	Windermere, Florida
G	1	Luis Rolon	6 ft 2 in (1.88 m)	205 lb (93 kg)	Fr	Central Pointe Christian Academy	Ponce, Puerto Rico
G	2	Caleb Catto	6 ft 5 in (1.96 m)	182 lb (83 kg)	Jr	Southwest Florida Christian Academy	Cape Coral, Florida
G	3	Franco Miller Jr.	6 ft 3 in (1.91 m)	201 lb (91 kg)	RS So	Ole Miss	Freeport, Bahamas
G	4	Cyrus Largie	6 ft 3 in (1.91 m)	204 lb (93 kg)	So	Mater Lakes Academy	Miramar, Florida
G	5	Jalen Warren	6 ft 3 in (1.91 m)	204 lb (93 kg)	Sr	Eastern Florida State	Milton, Ontario
F	10	Zach Anderson	6 ft 7 in (2.01 m)	205 lb (93 kg)	Fr	Apopka High School	Orlando, Florida
F	11	Qwanzi Samuels	6 ft 8 in (2.03 m)	192 lb (87 kg)	So	Loomis Chaffee School	District Heights, Maryland
G/F	12	Kyle Murphy	6 ft 5 in (1.96 m)	197 lb (89 kg)	Fr	Bosco Institute	Weston, Massachusetts
G	13	Victor Rosa	6 ft 5 in (1.96 m)	188 lb (85 kg)	Fr	Central Pointe Christian Academy	Naranjito, Puerto Rico
F	14	Eli Abaev	6 ft 8 in (2.03 m)	206 lb (93 kg)	GS	Austin Peay	Deerfield Beach, Florida
G	15	Sam Gagliardi	6 ft 4 in (1.93 m)	194 lb (88 kg)	Sr	California Baptist	Gig Harbor, Washington
G	20	Chance Jackson	6 ft 6 in (1.98 m)	202 lb (92 kg)	So	Plant High School	Tampa, Florida
G	23	Dom London	6 ft 1 in (1.85 m)	165 lb (75 kg)	Jr	Harcum College	Christiana, Pennsylvania
C	32	Justus Rainwater	6 ft 8 in (2.03 m)	220 lb (100 kg)	Sr	Cochise College	Enumclaw, Washington
G	51	Lenny Ricca	6 ft 2 in (1.88 m)	170 lb (77 kg)	So	St. Thomas Aquinas High School	Weston, Florida

Head coach

- Michael Fly (Kentucky)

Assistant coach(es)

- Donnie Marsh (Franklin & Marshall)
- Justin Furr (Wingate)
- Joey Cantens (Eckerd)

Legend

- (C) Team captain
- (S) Suspended
- (I) Ineligible
- (W) Walk-on
- Injured
- Current redshirt

Roster
Last update: November 27, 2020

== Schedule and results ==
Date time, TV	Rank^{#}	Opponent^{#}	Result	Record	High points	High rebounds	High assists	Site (attendance) city, state
Non-conference regular season
November 25, 2020*; 7:00 pm		Florida A&M	W 65–56	1–0	13 – Catto	4 – 5 tied	4 – Rolon	Alico Arena (851); Fort Myers, FL
December 2, 2020*; 5:00 pm		at South Florida	L 57–78	1–1	15 – Warren	10 – Abaev	4 – Catto	Yuengling Center; Tampa, FL
December 5, 2020*; 7:00 pm		Florida National	W 91–74	2–1	23 – Catto	11 – Largie	6 – Warren	Alico Arena (841); Fort Myers, FL
December 12, 2020*; 12:00 pm, FS/FSGO/ACCN		at Miami (FL)	W 66–62	3–1	18 – Catto	9 – Abaev	8 – Rolon	Watsco Center; Coral Gables, FL
December 16, 2020*; 7:00 pm		FIU	L 69–85	3–2	22 – Catto	14 – Abaev	6 – Rolon	Alico Arena (797); Fort Myers, FL
December 18, 2020*; 7:00 pm		Webber International	W 112–39	4–2	22 – London	7 – Tied	10 – Miller Jr.	Alico Arena (688); Fort Myers, FL
December 22, 2020*; 7:00 pm		Georgia Southern	W 73–60	5–2	19 – Catto	8 – Largie	5 – Rolon	Alico Arena (813); Fort Myers, FL
Atlantic Sun Conference regular season
January 1, 2021; 7:00 pm		North Alabama	Postponed due to positive COVID-19 tests					Alico Arena; Fort Myers, FL
January 2, 2021; 7:00 pm		North Alabama	Postponed due to positive COVID-19 tests					Alico Arena; Fort Myers, FL
January 8, 2021; TBA		at Liberty	Postponed due to positive COVID-19 tests					Liberty Arena; Lynchburg, VA
January 9, 2021; TBA		at Liberty	Postponed due to positive COVID-19 tests					Liberty Arena; Lynchburg, VA
January 15, 2021; 7:00 pm		Bellarmine	L 60–74	5–3 (0–1)	15 – Catto	6 – Abaev	6 – Rolon	Alico Arena (1,000); Fort Myers, FL
January 16, 2021; 7:00 pm		Bellarmine	L 63–80	5–4 (0–2)	13 – Warren	7 – Abaev	7 – Rolon	Alico Arena (931); Fort Myers, FL
January 22, 2021; 8:00 pm		at Lipscomb	W 79–69	6–4 (1–2)	22 – Largie	12 – Anderson	7 – Miller	Allen Arena (756); Nashville, TN
January 23, 2021; 8:00 pm		at Lipscomb	L 56–71	6–5 (1–3)	22 – Largie	8 – Tied	2 – Tied	Allen Arena (810); Nashville, TN
January 29, 2021; 7:00 pm		Stetson	W 64–63	7–5 (2–3)	12 – Warren	7 – Catto	4 – Warren	Alico Arena (878); Fort Myers, FL
January 30, 2021; 7:00 pm		Stetson	L 66–67	7–6 (2–4)	16 – Largie	9 – Rivers	4 – Warren	Alico Arena (894); Fort Myers, FL
February 5, 2021; 7:00 pm, ESPN+		North Alabama	W 86–60	8–6 (3–4)	16 – Warren	10 – Abaev	5 – Warren	Alico Arena (821); Fort Myers, FL
February 6, 2021; 7:00 pm, ESPN+		North Alabama	W 69-60	9–6 (4–4)	28 – Warren	8 – Catto	3 – Miller Jr.	Alico Arena; Fort Myers, FL
February 26, 2021; 7:00 pm, ESPN+		Jacksonville	Cancelled					Alico Arena; Fort Myers, FL
February 26, 2021; 6:00 pm, ESPN+		Kennesaw State	L 63–80	9–7 (4–5)	14 – Catto	7 – Tied	4 – Abaev	KSU Convocation Center; Kennesaw, GA
February 27, 2021; 6:00 pm, ESPN+		Jacksonville	Cancelled					Alico Arena; Fort Myers, FL
Atlantic Sun tournament
March 4, 2021; 7:00 pm, ESPN+	(6)	vs. (3) Lipscomb; Quarterfinals	W 72–60	10–7	19 – Largie	7 – Abaev	9 – Rolon	Swisher Gymnasium; Jacksonville, FL
March 5, 2021; 7:00 pm, ESPN+	(6)	vs. (5) North Alabama; Semifinals	L 81–96	10–8	19 – Warren	7 – Abaev	4 – Rolon	UNF Arena; Jacksonville, FL
*Non-conference game. ^{#}Rankings from AP Poll. (#) Tournament seedings in parentheses. All times are in Eastern Time.
