= 2021 ASUN men's basketball tournament =

- Classification: Division I
- Season: 2020–21
- Teams: 8
- Site: UNF Arena & Swisher Gymnasium; Jacksonville, FL
- Champions: Liberty (3rd title)
- Winning coach: Ritchie McKay (3rd title)
- MVP: Darius McGhee (Liberty)
- Television: ESPN, ESPN+

2020–21 ASUN men's basketball standings
	Conf.				Overall
Team	W		L	PCT	W		L	PCT
Liberty †	11	–	2	.846	23	–	6	.793
Bellarmine *	10	–	3	.769	14	–	8	.636
Lipscomb	9	–	6	.600	15	–	12	.556
North Florida	6	–	6	.500	8	–	15	.348
North Alabama *	7	–	8	.467	13	–	11	.542
Florida Gulf Coast	4	–	5	.444	10	–	8	.556
Stetson	7	–	9	.438	12	–	15	.444
Jacksonville	5	–	9	.357	11	–	13	.458
Kennesaw State	2	–	13	.133	5	–	19	.208
† 2021 ASUN Tournament winner * ineligible for the 2021 NCAA tournament due to transition period Jacksonville suspended their season on February 26, 2021

The 2021 ASUN men's basketball tournament was the conference postseason tournament for the ASUN Conference. The tournament was the 42nd year the league has conducted a postseason tournament. The tournament was held March 4–7, 2021 in Jacksonville, Florida. Quarterfinals were played at both Swisher Gymnasium and UNF Arena, while the semifinals and finals were held solely at UNF Arena. The eligible winner received the conference's automatic bid to the NCAA tournament.

When No. 5 seeded North Alabama defeated No. 6 Florida Gulf Coast in the second semifinal game, Liberty was awarded the ASUN automatic bid to the NCAA tournament since North Alabama is ineligible as a team transitioning to Division I.

== Seeds ==
All of the teams, except for Jacksonville, in the conference standings qualified for the tournament. Jacksonville cancelled their season after going 11–13, so they did not compete in the conference tournament. The teams were seeded by their record in conference play, with a tiebreaker system to seed teams with identical conference records.

The two tiebreakers used by the ASUN are: 1) head-to-head record of teams with identical record and 2) NCAA NET Rankings available on day following the conclusion of ASUN regular season play.

Seed	School	Conference	Tiebreaker
1	Liberty	11–2	
2	Bellarmine	10–3	
3	Lipscomb	9–5	
4	North Florida	6–6	
5	North Alabama	7–8	
6	Florida Gulf Coast	4–5	
7	Stetson	7–9	
8	Kennesaw State	2–13	

== Schedule ==
Game	Time	Matchup	Score	Television	Attendance
Quarterfinals – Thursday, March 4
1	2:00 pm	No. 1 Liberty vs. No. 8 Kennesaw State	69–59	ESPN+	
2	2:00 pm	No. 4 North Florida vs. No. 5 North Alabama	60–68	ESPN+	
3	7:00 pm	No. 3 Lipscomb vs. No. 6 Florida Gulf Coast	60–72	ESPN+	
4	7:00 pm	No. 2 Bellarmine vs. No. 7 Stetson	70–73	ESPN+	
Semifinals – Friday, March 5
5	2:00 pm	No. 1 Liberty vs. No. 7 Stetson	77–64	ESPN+	
6	7:00 pm	No. 5 North Alabama vs No. 6 Florida Gulf Coast	96–81	ESPN+	
Championship – Sunday, March 7
7	2:00 pm	No. 1 Liberty vs. No. 5 North Alabama	79–75	ESPN	
Game times in ET. Rankings denote tournament seeding.

== Bracket ==
Teams are reseeded after the quarterfinals

Quarterfinals; March 4 ESPN+
1	Liberty	69
8	Kennesaw State	59
2	Bellarmine	70
7	Stetson	73
4	North Florida	60
5	North Alabama	68
3	Lipscomb	60
6	Florida Gulf Coast	72

Semifinals; March 5 ESPN+
1	Liberty	77
7	Stetson	64
5	North Alabama	96
6	Florida Gulf Coast	81

Championship; March 7 ESPN
1	Liberty	79
5	North Alabama	75
