= 2020–21 Liberty Flames basketball team =

American college basketball season

2020–21 Liberty Flames basketball

Atlantic Sun regular season and tournament champions

NCAA tournament, first round
- Conference: ASUN Conference
- Record: 23–6 (11–2 ASUN)
- Head coach: Ritchie McKay (6th (8th overall) season)
- Assistant coaches: Brad Soucie (6th (8th) season); Derek Johnston (3rd season); Joe Pierre III (1st season)
- Home arena: Liberty Arena

2020–21 ASUN men's basketball standings
	Conf.				Overall
Team	W		L	PCT	W		L	PCT
Liberty †	11	–	2	.846	23	–	6	.793
Bellarmine *	10	–	3	.769	14	–	8	.636
Lipscomb	9	–	6	.600	15	–	12	.556
North Florida	6	–	6	.500	8	–	15	.348
North Alabama *	7	–	8	.467	13	–	11	.542
Florida Gulf Coast	4	–	5	.444	10	–	8	.556
Stetson	7	–	9	.438	12	–	15	.444
Jacksonville	5	–	9	.357	11	–	13	.458
Kennesaw State	2	–	13	.133	5	–	19	.208
† 2021 ASUN Tournament winner * ineligible for the 2021 NCAA tournament due to transition period Jacksonville suspended their season on February 26, 2021

The 2020–21 Liberty Flames men's basketball team represented Liberty University in the 2020–21 NCAA Division I men's basketball season. The team plays its home games in Lynchburg, Virginia for the inaugural season at Liberty Arena, with a capacity of 4,000. The team was led by Ritchie McKay, who was in the sixth season of his current stint as head coach and eighth overall. Liberty was a third-year member of the ASUN Conference. They finished the season 23-6, 11-2 in ASUN Play to finish in ASUN regular season champions. They defeated Kennesaw State, Stetson, and North Alabama to be champions of the ASUN tournament. They received the ASUN’s automatic bid to the NCAA tournament where they lost in the first round to Oklahoma State.

== Previous season ==
The Flames finished the 2019–20 season 30–4, 13–3 in ASUN play to finish in first place in their third season in the ASUN. They defeated NJIT, Stetson, and Lipscomb in the championship game to win the ASUN tournament.

The team officially qualified for the NCAA tournament but it was cancelled as a result of the global pandemic.

== Departures ==
Name	Number	Pos.	Height	Weight	Year	Hometown	Notes
Myo Baxter-Bell	0	Forward	6'5"	255	RS Senior	Cincinnati	Graduated
Caleb Homesley	1	Forward	6'6"	205	RS Senior	Indian Trail, North Carolina	Graduated
Georgie Pacheco-Ortiz	11	Guard	6'1"	170	Senior	Ponce, Puerto Rico	Graduated
Scottie James	31	Forward	6'8"	235	RS Senior	Tarpon Springs, Florida	Graduated
Brandon Newton	55	Center	7'2"	235	Sophomore	Roanoke, Virginia	Transferred to Trevecca Nazarene

== 2020-21 Newcomers ==
College recruiting information
Name	Hometown	School	Height	Weight	Commit date
Drake Dobbs; G	Eden Prairie, Minnesota	Eden Prairie High School	6 ft 3 in (1.91 m)	N/A	Jan 3, 2019
Drake Dobbs; G	Recruit ratings: Rivals:				
Isiah Warfield; G	Sewickley, Pennsylvania	Sewickley Academy	6 ft 5 in (1.96 m)	N/A	Mar 28, 2019
Isiah Warfield; G	Recruit ratings: Rivals: 247Sports:				
Jonathan Jackson; G	Overland Park, Kansas	Blue Valley High School	6 ft 4 in (1.93 m)	N/A	Nov 13, 2019
Jonathan Jackson; G	Recruit ratings: No ratings found				
Micaiah Abii; F	Frisco, Texas	Liberty High School	6 ft 7 in (2.01 m)	N/A	
Micaiah Abii; F	Recruit ratings: No ratings found				
Chris Parker; G	Plano, Texas	Henderson State	6 ft 1 in (1.85 m)	N/A	
Chris Parker; G	Recruit ratings: No ratings found				
Overall recruit ranking:
Note: In many cases, Scout, Rivals, 247Sports, On3, and ESPN may conflict in their listings of height and weight.; In these cases, the average was taken. ESPN grades are on a 100-point scale.; Sources: "2020 Team Ranking". Rivals.

== Roster ==
2020–21 Liberty Flames men's basketball team
Players
Coaches

Pos.	#	Name	Height	Weight	Year	Previous school	Hometown
G	0	Drake Dobbs	6 ft 3 in (1.91 m)	—	Fr	Eden Prairie HS	Eden Prairie, MN
G	1	Chris Parker	6 ft 1 in (1.85 m)	—	Sr	Henderson State	Plano, TX
G	2	Darius McGhee	5 ft 9 in (1.75 m)	—	Jr	Blue Ridge School	Roxboro, NC
G	3	Isiah Warfield	6 ft 5 in (1.96 m)	—	Fr	Sewickley Academy	Monaca, PA
G	4	Tytist Dean (W)	6 ft 0 in (1.83 m)	180 lb (82 kg)	RS So	North HS	St. Paul, MN
G	5	Marten Maide	6 ft 5 in (1.96 m)	—	RS Fr	Carmel Christian School	Charlotte, NC
G/F	10	Elijah Cuffee	6 ft 4 in (1.93 m)	185 lb (84 kg)	Sr	Liberty Christian Academy	Poca, WV
G	11	Jonathan Jackson	6 ft 4 in (1.93 m)	—	Fr	Blue Valley HS	Overland Park, KS
G	15	Colton Reed (W)	6 ft 3 in (1.91 m)	—	RS Jr	Roanoke	Wake Forest, NC
G/F	20	Keegan McDowell	6 ft 6 in (1.98 m)	—	RS Jr	Moeller HS	Cincinnati, OH
G	21	Luke McKay (W)	6 ft 2 in (1.88 m)	—	Sr	Liberty Christian Academy	Lynchburg, VA
F	22	Kyle Rode	6 ft 7 in (2.01 m)	—	So	Lexington Christian Academy	Lexington, KY
F	24	Micaiah Abii	6 ft 7 in (2.01 m)	—	Fr	Liberty HS	Frisco, TX
G	25	Josh Price	6 ft 3 in (1.91 m)	—	RS So	Carmel Christian School	Charlotte, NC
F	32	Blake Preston	6 ft 9 in (2.06 m)	—	RS So	Charlotte Christian School	Charlotte, NC
F	33	Shiloh Robinson	6 ft 7 in (2.01 m)	—	So	Kearney HS	Kearney, NE

Head coach

- Ritchie McKay (Seattle Pacific)

Assistant coach(es)

- Brad Soucie (Christian Heritage)
- Derek Johnston (Alabama-Huntsville)
- Joe Pierre III (Oklahoma State)

Legend

- (C) Team captain
- (S) Suspended
- (I) Ineligible
- (W) Walk-on
- Injured
- Current redshirt

Roster

- Roster is subject to change as/if players transfer or leave the program for other reasons.

== Schedule and results ==
Date time, TV	Rank^{#}	Opponent^{#}	Result	Record	High points	High rebounds	High assists	Site (attendance) city, state
Non-conference regular season
Nov 25, 2020*; 5:30 pm, CBSSN		vs. Purdue; Space Coast Challenge	L 64–77	0–1	21 – McGhee	6 – Tied	4 – 3 tied	Titan FieldHouse (0); Melbourne, FL
Nov 26, 2020*; 6:00 pm, CBSSN		vs. Mississippi State; Space Coast Challenge	W 84–73	1–1	23 – McGhee	5 – Preston	10 – Parker	Titan FieldHouse (0); Melbourne, FL
Nov 28, 2020*; 4:00 pm, ESPNews		vs. South Carolina; Hall of Fame Classic semifinals	W 78–62	2–1	18 – Rode	6 – Tied	5 – Parker	T-Mobile Center (0); Kansas City, MO
Nov 29, 2020*; 3:30 pm, ESPN2		vs. TCU; Hall of Fame Classic final	L 52–56	2–2	15 – McGhee	9 – McGhee	2 – Preston	T-Mobile Center (0); Kansas City, MO
Dec 3, 2020*; 7:00 pm, ESPN+		Saint Francis (PA)	W 78–62	3–2	21 – McDowell	7 – Tied	6 – Parker	Liberty Arena (250); Lynchburg, VA
Dec 5, 2020*; 2:00 pm, ESPN+		Bluefield	W 86–64	4–2	21 – McGhee	6 – Tied	7 – McDowell	Liberty Arena (250); Lynchburg, VA
Dec 9, 2020*; 8:00 pm, SECN		at Missouri	L 60–69	4–3	12 – Preston	5 – Preston	5 – Parker	Mizzou Arena; Columbia, MO
Dec 12, 2020*; 1:00 pm, ESPN+		Columbia International	W 73–26	5–3	11 – Preston	6 – 3 Tied	5 – Dobbs	Liberty Arena (250); Lynchburg, VA
Dec 15, 2020*; 7:00 pm, ESPN+		South Carolina State	W 82–52	6–3	16 – Tied	11 – Preston	8 – Parker	Liberty Arena (250); Lynchburg, VA
Dec 16, 2020*; 7:00 pm, ESPN+		Carver College	W 91–38	7–3	17 – Abii	7 – Preston	5 – Tied	Liberty Arena (250); Lynchburg, VA
Dec 22, 2020*; 1:00 pm		Alcorn State	W 108–65	8–3	20 – McGhee	9 – Rode	7 – Preston	Liberty Arena (250); Lynchburg, VA
Jan 1, 2021; 3:00 pm, ESPN+		at Lipscomb	L 70–77	8–4 (0–1)	16 – McGhee	11 – Preston	4 – McGhee	Allen Arena (820); Nashville, TN
Jan 2, 2021; 5:00 pm, ESPN+		at Lipscomb	W 66–50	9–4 (1–1)	20 – McGhee	9 – Preston	5 – Parker	Allen Arena (863); Nashville, TN
Jan 8, 2021; 6:00 pm, ESPN+		Kennesaw State	W 69–63	10–4 (2–1)	17 – Preston	7 – McGhee	3 – Parker	Liberty Arena (250); Lynchburg, VA
Jan 9, 2021; 5:00 pm, ESPN+		Kennesaw State	W 76–47	11–4 (3–1)	12 – McGhee	6 – McDowell	5 – Rode	Liberty Arena (250); Lynchburg, VA
Jan 8, 2021; 7:00 pm, ESPN+		Florida Gulf Coast	Cancelled due to COVID-19 issues					Liberty Arena; Lynchburg, VA
Jan 9, 2021; 7:00 pm, ESPN+		Florida Gulf Coast	Cancelled due to COVID-19 issues					Liberty Arena; Lynchburg, VA
Jan 15, 2021; 7:00 pm, ESPN+		at Stetson	L 59–65	11–5 (3–2)	18 – Parker	6 – 3 Tied	4 – Cuffee	Edmunds Center (50); Deland, FL
Jan 16, 2021; 5:00 pm, ESPN+		at Stetson	W 68–58	12–5 (4–2)	12 – Parker	11 – McGhee	4 – Parker	Edmunds Center (50); Deland, FL
Jan 29, 2021; 7:00 pm, ESPN+		at Jacksonville	W 59–54	13–5 (5–2)	18 – Parker	8 – Rode	3 – Parker	Swisher Gymnasium (180); Jacksonville, FL
Jan 30, 2021; 6:00 pm, ESPN+		at Jacksonville	W 64–58	14–5 (6–2)	25 – McGhee	6 – Rode	4 – Rode	Swisher Gymnasium (180); Jacksonville, FL
Feb 5, 2021; 6:00 pm, ESPN+		Lancaster Bible College	W 90–49	15–5	19 – Cuffee	9 – Preston	4 – Tied	Liberty Arena (250); Lynchburg, VA
Feb 12, 2021; 6:00 pm, ESPN+		North Florida	W 73–61	16–5 (7–2)	14 – Preston	10 – Preston	8 – Rode	Liberty Arena (250); Lynchburg, VA
Feb 13, 2021; 5:00 pm, ESPN+		North Florida	W 80–60	17–5 (8–2)	22 – McGhee	8 – Tied	5 – Rode	Liberty Arena (250); Lynchburg, VA
Feb 22, 2020; 12:00 pm, ESPN+		North Alabama	W 74–54	18–5 (9–2)	29 – McGhee	7 – Rode	6 – Parker	Liberty Arena (250); Lynchburg, VA
Feb 23, 2020; 12:00 pm, ESPN+		North Alabama	W 74–54	19–5 (10–2)	24 – McGhee	6 – Tied	3 – Tied	Liberty Arena (250); Lynchburg, VA
Feb 26, 2021; 7:00 pm, ESPN+		at Bellarmine	Cancelled					Freedom Hall; Louisville, KY
Feb 27, 2021; 12:00 pm, ESPNU		at Bellarmine	W 94–78	20–5 (11–2)	34 – McGhee	9 – Robinson	9 – Rode	Freedom Hall (2,737); Louisville, KY
Atlantic Sun tournament
Mar 4, 2021; 2:00 pm, ESPN+	(1)	vs. (8) Kennesaw State; Quarterfinals	W 69–59	21–5	16 – McGhee	6 – McDowell	3 – Tied	UNF Arena; Jacksonville, FL
Mar 5, 2021; 2:00 pm, ESPN+	(1)	vs. (7) Stetson; Semifinals	W 77–64	22–5	16 – Parker	10 – Preston	9 – McGhee	UNF Arena; Jacksonville, FL
Mar 7, 2021; 2:00 pm, ESPN	(1)	vs. (5) North Alabama; Championship	W 79–75	23–5	21 – McGhee	8 – McGhee	5 – Rode	UNF Arena; Jacksonville, FL
NCAA tournament
March 19, 2021*; 5:25 pm, TBS	(13 MW)	vs. (4 MW) No. 11 Oklahoma State; First Round	L 60–69	23–6	16 – Cuffee	7 – Preston	4 – Cuffee	Indiana Farmers Coliseum; Indianapolis, IN
*Non-conference game. ^{#}Rankings from AP Poll. (#) Tournament seedings in parentheses. All times are in Eastern Time..
