= 2020–21 North Florida Ospreys men's basketball team =

American college basketball season

2020–21 North Florida Ospreys men's basketball
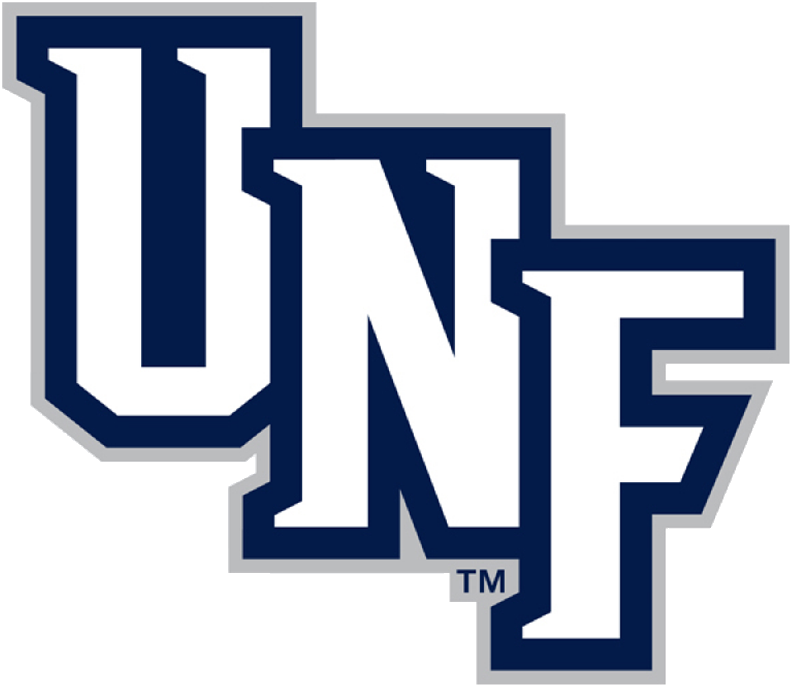
- Conference: Atlantic Sun Conference
- Record: 8–15 (6–6 ASUN)
- Head coach: Matthew Driscoll (12th season)
- Associate head coach: Bobby Kennen
- Assistant coaches: Bruce Evans; Stephen Perkins
- Home arena: UNF Arena

2020–21 ASUN men's basketball standings
	Conf.				Overall
Team	W		L	PCT	W		L	PCT
Liberty †	11	–	2	.846	23	–	6	.793
Bellarmine *	10	–	3	.769	14	–	8	.636
Lipscomb	9	–	6	.600	15	–	12	.556
North Florida	6	–	6	.500	8	–	15	.348
North Alabama *	7	–	8	.467	13	–	11	.542
Florida Gulf Coast	4	–	5	.444	10	–	8	.556
Stetson	7	–	9	.438	12	–	15	.444
Jacksonville	5	–	9	.357	11	–	13	.458
Kennesaw State	2	–	13	.133	5	–	19	.208
† 2021 ASUN Tournament winner * ineligible for the 2021 NCAA tournament due to transition period Jacksonville suspended their season on February 26, 2021

The 2020–21 North Florida Ospreys men's basketball team represented the University of North Florida in the 2020–21 NCAA Division I men's basketball season. The Ospreys, led by 12th-year head coach Matthew Driscoll, played their home games at the UNF Arena in Jacksonville, Florida as members of the Atlantic Sun Conference. They finished the season 8-15, 6-6 in ASUN Play to finish in 4th place. They lost in the quarterfinals of the ASUN tournament to North Alabama.

== Previous season ==
The Ospreys finished the 2019–20 season 21–12, 13–3 in ASUN play to finish as ASUN regular season co-champions, alongside Liberty. After tiebreakers, they received the #2 seed in the ASUN tournament, where they defeated the #7 seed Jacksonville in the quarterfinals, 91–88, before falling to the #3 seed Lipscomb, in the semifinals, 71–73.

== Roster ==
2020–21 North Florida Ospreys men's basketball team
Players
Coaches

Pos.	#	Name	Height	Weight	Year	Previous school	Hometown
G	0	Emmanuel Adedoyin	6 ft 2 in (1.88 m)	161 lb (73 kg)	So	Oak Ridge High School	Orlando, Florida
G	1	Jacob Crews	6 ft 7 in (2.01 m)	200 lb (91 kg)	Fr	Hilliard High School	Hilliard, Florida
G	2	Chaz Lanier	6 ft 4 in (1.93 m)	175 lb (79 kg)	Fr	The Ensworth School	Nashville, Tennessee
F	3	Carter Hendricksen	6 ft 7 in (2.01 m)	217 lb (98 kg)	Jr	Lexington Christian Academy	Lexington, Kentucky
F	4	Josh Endicott	6 ft 8 in (2.03 m)	190 lb (86 kg)	Jr	Motlow State Community College	Baxter, Tennessee
F	5	Dorian James	6 ft 7 in (2.01 m)	202 lb (92 kg)	RS Fr	Chain of Lakes Collegiate High School	Winter Haven, Florida
G	10	Christian Schach	6 ft 1 in (1.85 m)	188 lb (85 kg)	Jr	Tampa Prep	Tampa, Florida
G	11	Garrett Hursey	6 ft 6 in (1.98 m)	210 lb (95 kg)	Fr	West Nassau High School	Callahan, Florida
G	12	Ryan Burkhardt	6 ft 4 in (1.93 m)	184 lb (83 kg)	Sr	St. Augustine High School	St. Augustine, Florida
G	13	Alonde LeGrand	6 ft 7 in (2.01 m)	205 lb (93 kg)	RS Jr	Detroit Mercy	Harlem, New York
G	15	Jose Placer	6 ft 1 in (1.85 m)	174 lb (79 kg)	RS So	UMBC	Orlando, Florida
F	21	Jonathan Aybar	6 ft 9 in (2.06 m)	183 lb (83 kg)	Fr	Central Pointe Christian Academy	Kissimmee, Florida
G/F	23	Josh Berenbaum	6 ft 8 in (2.03 m)	215 lb (98 kg)	Fr	Calvary Christian High School	Clearwater, Florida
F	24	Jadyn Parker	6 ft 10 in (2.08 m)	180 lb (82 kg)	Fr	West Brunswick High School	Shallotte, North Carolina

Head coach

- Matthew Driscoll (Slippery Rock)

Assistant coach(es)

- Bobby Kennen (Palm Beach Atlantic)
- Bruce Evans (Furman)
- Stephen Perkins (Baylor)

Legend

- (C) Team captain
- (S) Suspended
- (I) Ineligible
- (W) Walk-on
- Injured
- Current redshirt

Roster
Last update: November 29, 2020

== Schedule and results ==
Date time, TV	Rank^{#}	Opponent^{#}	Result	Record	Site (attendance) city, state
Non-conference regular season
November 25, 2020*; 5:30 pm		vs. Eastern Kentucky; Wolfpack Invitational	L 67–80	0–1	Reynolds Coliseum; Raleigh, NC
November 27, 2020*; 8:00 pm, ACCRSN		at NC State; Wolfpack Invitational	L 51–86	0–2	Reynolds Coliseum (25); Raleigh, NC
November 29, 2020*; 6:00 pm, ACCRSN		at Miami (FL)	L 59–77	0–3	Watsco Center; Coral Gables, FL
December 2, 2020*; 8:00 pm, ACCN		at No. 22 Florida State	L 58–86	0–4	Donald L. Tucker Center (2,720); Tallahassee, FL
December 5, 2020*; 2:00 pm, ESPN+		at High Point	L 74–85	0–5	Millis Athletic Convocation Center (10); High Point, NC
December 7, 2020*; 7:00 pm, ESPN+		Florida Atlantic	L 77–79	0–6	UNF Arena (656); Jacksonville, FL
December 10, 2020*; 6:00 pm, ESPN+		at East Carolina	L 67–73	0–7	Williams Arena (50); Greenville, NC
December 12, 2020*; 2:00 pm, ESPN+		FIU	W 80–77	1–7	UNF Arena (536); Jacksonville, FL
December 16, 2020*; 7:00 pm, SECN		at Florida	Postponed		O'Connell Center; Gainesville, FL
December 19, 2020*; 5:00 pm, ESPN+		Flagler	L 66–73	1–8	UNF Arena (1,351); Jacksonville, FL
December 21, 2020*; 7:00 pm, ESPN+		Edward Waters	W 98–71	2–8	UNF Arena (542); Jacksonville, FL
Atlantic Sun Conference regular season
January 1, 2021; 7:00 pm, ESPN+		at Stetson; Postponed due to positive COVID-19 tests			Edmunds Center; DeLand, FL
January 2, 2021; 5:00 pm, ESPN+		at Stetson; Postponed due to positive COVID-19 tests			Edmunds Center; DeLand, FL
January 8, 2021; 7:00 pm, ESPN+		at Jacksonville	L 65–66	2–9 (0–1)	Swisher Gymnasium (180); Jacksonville, FL
January 9, 2021; 5:00 pm, ESPN+		at Jacksonville	W 70–68	3–9 (1–1)	Swisher Gymnasium (180); Jacksonville, FL
January 15, 2021; 7:00 pm, ESPN+		at Lipscomb	L 72–84	3–10 (1–2)	Allen Arena (759); Nashville, TN
January 16, 2021; 5:00 pm, ESPN+		at Lipscomb	W 72–67	4–10 (2–2)	Allen Arena (735); Nashville, TN
January 22, 2021; 7:00 pm, ESPN+		Kennesaw State	W 69–54	5–10 (3–2)	UNF Arena (787); Jacksonville, FL
January 23, 2021; 5:00 pm, ESPN+		Kennesaw State	W 68–65	6–10 (4–2)	UNF Arena (703); Jacksonville, FL
January 29, 2021; 7:00 pm, ESPN+		North Alabama	L 78–82	6–11 (4–3)	UNF Arena (807); Jacksonville, FL
January 30, 2021; 5:00 pm, ESPN+		North Alabama	W 82–72	7–11 (5–3)	UNF Arena (714); Jacksonville, FL
February 5, 2021; 7:00 pm, ESPN+		at Liberty	Postponed		Liberty Arena; Lynchburg, VA
February 6, 2021; 7:00 pm, ESPN+		at Liberty	Postponed		Liberty Arena; Lynchburg, VA
February 12, 2021; 6:00 pm, ESPN+		at Liberty	L 61–73	7–12 (5–4)	Liberty Arena (250); Lynchburg, VA
February 13, 2021; 5:00 pm, ESPN+		at Liberty	L 60–80	7–13 (5–5)	Liberty Arena (250); Lynchburg, VA
February 19, 2021; 7:00 pm, ESPN+		Bellarmine	Canceled		UNF Arena; Jacksonville, FL
February 20, 2021; 5:00 pm, ESPN+		Bellarmine	Canceled		UNF Arena; Jacksonville, FL
February 26, 2021; 7:00 pm, ESPN+		at Stetson	W 79–74	8–13 (6–5)	Edmunds Center; DeLand, FL
February 27, 2021; 7:00 pm, ESPN+		at Stetson	L 68–85	8–14 (6–6)	Edmunds Center; DeLand, FL
Atlantic Sun tournament
March 4, 2021; 2:00 pm, ESPN+	(4)	vs. (5) North Alabama; Quarterfinals	L 60–68	8–15	Swisher Gymnasium; Jacksonville, FL
*Non-conference game. ^{#}Rankings from AP Poll. (#) Tournament seedings in parentheses. All times are in Eastern.
