= 2020–21 Clemson Tigers men's basketball team =

American college basketball season

2020–21 Clemson Tigers men's basketball
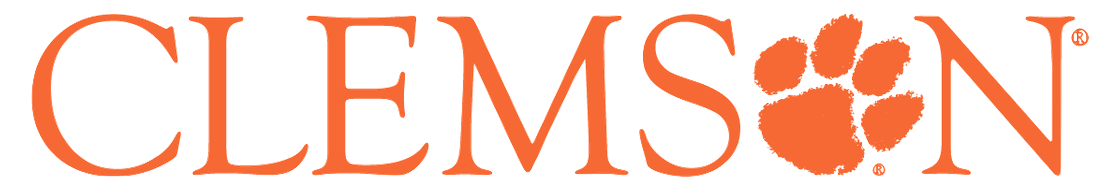

Space Coast Challenge Champions

NCAA tournament, first round
- Conference: Atlantic Coast Conference
- Record: 16–8 (10–6 ACC)
- Head coach: Brad Brownell (11th season)
- Assistant coaches: Antonio Reynolds-Dean (4th season); Dick Bender (5th season); Anthony Goins (2nd season)
- Home arena: Littlejohn Coliseum

2020–21 ACC men's basketball standings
	Conf.				Overall
Team	W		L	PCT	W		L	PCT
No. 15 Virginia	13	–	4	.765	18	–	7	.720
No. 14 Florida State	11	–	4	.733	18	–	7	.720
No. 25 Virginia Tech	9	–	4	.692	15	–	7	.682
Georgia Tech †	11	–	6	.647	17	–	9	.654
Clemson	10	–	6	.625	16	–	8	.667
North Carolina	10	–	6	.625	18	–	11	.621
Louisville	8	–	5	.615	13	–	7	.650
Syracuse	9	–	7	.563	18	–	10	.643
NC State	9	–	8	.529	14	–	11	.560
Duke	9	–	9	.500	13	–	11	.542
Notre Dame	7	–	11	.389	11	–	15	.423
Pittsburgh	6	–	10	.375	10	–	12	.455
Miami (FL)	4	–	15	.211	10	–	17	.370
Wake Forest	3	–	15	.167	6	–	16	.273
Boston College	2	–	11	.154	4	–	16	.200
† 2021 ACC tournament winner Rankings from AP poll

The 2020–21 Clemson Tigers men's basketball team represented Clemson University during the 2020–21 NCAA Division I men's basketball season. The Tigers were led by eleventh-year head coach Brad Brownell and played their home games at Littlejohn Coliseum in Clemson, South Carolina as members of the Atlantic Coast Conference.

The Tigers finished the season 16–8, and 10–6 in ACC play to finish in a tie for fifth place. As the fifth seed in the ACC tournament they earned a bye into the Second Round where they lost to Miami. They earned an at-large bid to the NCAA tournament as a seven seed in the Midwest Region. They lost in the first round to 10 seed Rutgers.

== Previous season ==
The Tigers finished the 2019–20 season 16–15, 9–11 in ACC play to finish in eighth place. The team was scheduled to play Florida State in the quarterfinals of the ACC tournament before the tournament was cancelled due to the COVID-19 pandemic. The NCAA tournament and NIT were also cancelled due to the pandemic.

== Offseason ==
=== Departures ===
Name	Number	Pos.	Height	Weight	Year	Hometown	Reason for departure
Curran Scott	10	G	6'4"	205	(redshirt) Senior	Edmond, OK	Graduated
Tevin Mack	13	G/F	6'6"	227	(redshirt) Senior	Columbia, SC	Graduated
Khavon Moore	21	G/F	6'8"	217	Sophomore	Macon, GA	Transferred to USC Upstate
Paul Grinde	30	F	6'10"	300	(redshirt) Senior	Virginia Beach, VA	Graduated
Trey Jemison	55	C	7'0"	256	Sophomore	Birmingham, AL	Transferred to UAB

=== 2020 recruiting class ===
College recruiting information
Name	Hometown	School	Height	Weight	Commit date
Olivier-Maxence Prosper; G/F	Montreal, Canada	NBA Academy Latin America	6 ft 8 in (2.03 m)	218 lb (99 kg)	Oct 24, 2019
Olivier-Maxence Prosper; G/F	Recruit ratings: Scout: Rivals: 247Sports:				
PJ Hall; F	Spartanburg, SC	Dorman High School	6 ft 10 in (2.08 m)	235 lb (107 kg)	Oct 23, 2019
PJ Hall; F	Recruit ratings: Scout: Rivals: 247Sports: ESPN: (87)				
Lynn Kidd; C	Gainesville, FL	IMG Academy	6 ft 10 in (2.08 m)	235 lb (107 kg)	Jul 29, 2020
Lynn Kidd; C	Recruit ratings: Scout: Rivals: 247Sports: ESPN: (81)				
Overall recruit ranking:
Note: In many cases, Scout, Rivals, 247Sports, On3, and ESPN may conflict in their listings of height and weight.; In these cases, the average was taken. ESPN grades are on a 100-point scale.; Sources: "2020 Clemson Basketball Commitment List". Rivals.; "Clemson Tigers". ESPN.; "2020 Team Ranking". Rivals.

== Roster ==
2020–21 Clemson Tigers men's basketball team
Players
Coaches

Pos.	#	Name	Height	Weight	Year	Hometown
G	0	Clyde Trapp	6 ft 4 in (1.93 m)	194 lb (88 kg)	Sr	Columbia, South Carolina
F	1	Jonathan Baehre	6 ft 10 in (2.08 m)	209 lb (95 kg)	RS Sr	Hessen, Germany
G	2	Al-Amir Dawes	6 ft 2 in (1.88 m)	180 lb (82 kg)	So	Trenton, New Jersey
G	3	Chase Hunter	6 ft 3 in (1.91 m)	200 lb (91 kg)	So	Atlanta, Georgia
G	4	Nick Honor	5 ft 10 in (1.78 m)	205 lb (93 kg)	RS Jr	Orlando, Florida
F	5	Hunter Tyson	6 ft 8 in (2.03 m)	211 lb (96 kg)	Jr	Monroe, North Carolina
G/F	10	Olivier-Maxence Prosper	6 ft 8 in (2.03 m)	218 lb (99 kg)	Fr	Montreal, Canada
G	11	Parker Fox (W)	6 ft 6 in (1.98 m)	202 lb (92 kg)	Jr	Reno, Nevada
G	12	Alex Hemenway	6 ft 3 in (1.91 m)	180 lb (82 kg)	So	Newburgh, Indiana
G	15	John Newman III	6 ft 5 in (1.96 m)	207 lb (94 kg)	Jr	Greensboro, North Carolina
F	20	O'Neil McBride (W)	6 ft 7 in (2.01 m)	207 lb (94 kg)	So	Myrtle Beach, South Carolina
G	21	Wells Hoag (W)	6 ft 3 in (1.91 m)	199 lb (90 kg)	Jr	Greenville, South Carolina
F	22	Lynn Kidd	6 ft 10 in (2.08 m)	235 lb (107 kg)	Fr	Gainesville, Florida
F	24	PJ Hall	6 ft 10 in (2.08 m)	235 lb (107 kg)	Fr	Spartanburg, South Carolina
F	25	Aamir Simms	6 ft 8 in (2.03 m)	245 lb (111 kg)	Sr	Palmyra, Virginia

Head coach

- Brad Brownell (DePauw)

Assistant coach(es)

- Antonio Reynolds Dean (Rhode Island)
- Dick Bender (McDaniel)
- Anthony Goins (St. John's)

Legend

- (C) Team captain
- (S) Suspended
- (I) Ineligible
- (W) Walk-on
- Injured
- Current redshirt

Roster
Last update: November 12, 2020

== Schedule and results ==
Date time, TV	Rank^{#}	Opponent^{#}	Result	Record	High points	High rebounds	High assists	Site (attendance) city, state
Regular season
November 25, 2020*; 8:30 p.m., CBSSN		Mississippi State; Space Coast Challenge	W 53–42	1–0	10 – Tied	8 – Tyson	4 – Trapp	Titan Field House (0); Melbourne, FL
November 26, 2020*; 8:30 p.m., CBSSN		Purdue; Space Coast Challenge	W 81–70	2–0	24 – Simms	5 – Dawes	4 – Simms	Titan Field House (0); Melbourne, FL
December 2, 2020*; 6:00 p.m., ACCN		South Carolina State	W 75–38	3–0	13 – Tyson	6 – Tyson	4 – Tied	Littlejohn Coliseum (1,345); Clemson, SC
December 9, 2020*; 5:00 p.m., ESPN2		Maryland; ACC–Big Ten Challenge	W 67–51	4–0	16 – Simms	7 – Tied	2 – Tied	Littlejohn Coliseum (1,876); Clemson, SC
December 12, 2020*; 8:30 p.m., ACCNX		vs. Alabama; Holiday Hoopsgiving	W 64–56	5–0	10 – Dawes	8 – Baehre	3 – Tied	State Farm Arena (0); Atlanta, GA
December 15, 2020; 6:30 p.m., ACCN	No. 24	at Virginia Tech	L 60–66	5–1 (0–1)	18 – Dawes	4 – Dawes	4 – Honor	Cassell Coliseum (250); Blacksburg, VA
December 19, 2020*; 12:00 p.m., ESPNU	No. 24	at South Carolina; Rivalry	Postponed due to COVID-19 issues					Colonial Life Arena; Columbia, SC
December 21, 2020*; 12:00 p.m., ACCN		Morehead State	W 66–51	6–1	14 – Honor	10 – Simms	3 – Dawes	Littlejohn Coliseum (1,508); Clemson, SC
December 29, 2020; 7:00 p.m., ACCRSN		No. 18 Florida State	W 77–67	7–1 (1–1)	15 – Trapp	11 – Simms	4 – Newman III	Littlejohn Coliseum (1,876); Clemson, SC
January 2, 2021; 2:00 p.m., ACCRSN		at Miami (FL)	W 66–65	8–1 (2–1)	25 – Simms	7 – Simms	5 – Tied	Watsco Center (0); Coral Gables, FL
January 5, 2021; 7:00 p.m., ACCN	No. 19	NC State	W 74–70 ^{OT}	9–1 (3–1)	21 – Honor	7 – Tied	4 – Simms	Littlejohn Coliseum (1,876); Clemson, SC
January 9, 2021; 7:00 p.m., ESPN	No. 19	at North Carolina	Postponed due to COVID-19 issues					Dean Smith Center; Chapel Hill, NC
January 16, 2021; 6:00 p.m., ESPN	No. 12	No. 18 Virginia	L 50–85	9–2 (3–2)	8 – Hall	5 – Tied	2 – Honor	Littlejohn Coliseum (1,876); Clemson, SC
January 20, 2021; 7:00 p.m., ACCRSN	No. 20	at Georgia Tech	L 65–83	9–3 (3–3)	19 – Simms	7 – Trapp	4 – Baehre	McCamish Pavilion (1,200); Atlanta, GA
January 23, 2021; 3:00 p.m., ABC	No. 20	at Florida State	L 61–80	9–4 (3–4)	12 – Newman III	5 – Tied	3 – Honor	Donald L. Tucker Civic Center (2,950); Tallahassee, FL
January 27, 2021; 9:00 p.m., ACCRSN		Boston College	Postponed due to COVID-19 issues					Littlejohn Coliseum; Clemson, SC
January 27, 2021; 9:00 p.m., RSN		No. 25 Louisville	W 54–50	10–4 (4–4)	16 – Simms	9 – Simms	4 – Simms	Littlejohn Coliseum (1,876); Clemson, SC
January 30, 2021; 12:00 p.m., ESPN2		at Duke	L 53–79	10–5 (4–5)	19 – Simms	9 – Prosper	4 – Simms	Cameron Indoor Stadium (0); Durham, NC
February 2, 2021; 7:00 p.m., ACCN		North Carolina	W 63–50	11–5 (5–5)	16 – Tyson	9 – Trapp	6 – Simms	Littlejohn Coliseum (1,876); Clemson, SC
February 6, 2021; 2:00 p.m., ACCN		Syracuse	W 78–61	12–5 (6–5)	18 – Simms	11 – Simms	11 – Trapp	Littlejohn Coliseum (1,876); Clemson, SC
February 12, 2021; 8:00 p.m., ACCN		Georgia Tech	W 74–72	13–5 (7–5)	25 – Simms	8 – Trapp	3 – 3 tied	Littlejohn Coliseum (1,876); Clemson, SC
February 17, 2021; 7:00 p.m., ACCRSN		at Notre Dame	Postponed due to COVID-19 issues					Edmund P. Joyce Center; Notre Dame, IN
February 21, 2021; 6:00 p.m., ACCN		at Pittsburgh	Postponed due to COVID-19 issues					Petersen Events Center; Pittsburgh, PA
February 24, 2021; 4:30 p.m., ACCN		at Wake Forest	W 60–39	14–5 (8–5)	17 – Hemenway	10 – Tied	6 – Honor	LJVM Coliseum (70); Winston-Salem, NC
February 27, 2021; 2:00 p.m., ACCRSN		Miami (FL)	W 66–58	15–5 (9–5)	19 – Tied	6 – Tied	4 – Trapp	Littlejohn Coliseum (1,876); Clemson, SC
March 3, 2021; 5:00 p.m., ACCN		at Syracuse	L 54–64	15–6 (9–6)	11 – Tied	8 – Simms	5 – Trapp	Carrier Dome (0); Syracuse, NY
March 6, 2021; 12:00 p.m., ACCRSN		Pittsburgh	W 77–62	16–6 (10–6)	21 – Dawes	6 – Trapp	5 – Tied	Littlejohn Coliseum (1,876); Clemson, SC
ACC tournament
March 10, 2021; 2:30 p.m., ACCN	(5)	vs. (13) Miami; Second round	L 64–67	16–7	17 – Simms	8 – Simms	4 – Simms	Greensboro Coliseum (2,820); Greensboro, NC
NCAA tournament
March 19, 2021; 9:20 pm, TBS	(7 MW)	vs. (10 MW) Rutgers; First Round	L 56–60	16–8	15 – Simms	11 – Simms	3 – Tied	Bankers Life Fieldhouse; Indianapolis, IN
*Non-conference game. ^{#}Rankings from AP Poll. (#) Tournament seedings in parentheses. MW=Midwest. All times are in Eastern Time.

== Rankings ==
Ranking movements Legend: ██ Increase in ranking ██ Decrease in ranking — = Not ranked RV = Received votes т = Tied with team above or below
	Week																	
Poll	Pre	1	2	3	4	5	6	7	8	9	10	11	12	13	14	15	16	Final
AP	—	RV	RV	24	RV	RV	19т	12	20	RV	—	RV	RV	RV	RV	RV	RV	Not released
Coaches	—	—^	RV	RV	RV	RV	18	12	22	RV	—	RV	RV	RV	RV	RV	RV	RV

*AP does not release post-NCAA tournament rankings
^Coaches did not release a Week 2 poll.

== See also ==
- 2020–21 Clemson Tigers women's basketball team
