= 2020–21 Lipscomb Bisons men's basketball team =

American college basketball season

2020–21 Lipscomb Bisons men's basketball
- Conference: Atlantic Sun Conference
- Record: 15–12 (9–6 ASUN)
- Head coach: Lennie Acuff (2nd season)
- Assistant coaches: Kevin Carroll; Roger Idstrom; Tyler Murray
- Home arena: Allen Arena

2020–21 ASUN men's basketball standings
	Conf.				Overall
Team	W		L	PCT	W		L	PCT
Liberty †	11	–	2	.846	23	–	6	.793
Bellarmine *	10	–	3	.769	14	–	8	.636
Lipscomb	9	–	6	.600	15	–	12	.556
North Florida	6	–	6	.500	8	–	15	.348
North Alabama *	7	–	8	.467	13	–	11	.542
Florida Gulf Coast	4	–	5	.444	10	–	8	.556
Stetson	7	–	9	.438	12	–	15	.444
Jacksonville	5	–	9	.357	11	–	13	.458
Kennesaw State	2	–	13	.133	5	–	19	.208
† 2021 ASUN Tournament winner * ineligible for the 2021 NCAA tournament due to transition period Jacksonville suspended their season on February 26, 2021

The 2020–21 Lipscomb Bisons men's basketball team represented Lipscomb University in the 2020–21 NCAA Division I men's basketball season. The Bisons, led by 2nd-year head coach Lennie Acuff, played their home games at the Allen Arena in Nashville, Tennessee as members of the Atlantic Sun Conference. They finished the season 15-12, 9-6 in ASUN Play to finish in 3rd place. They lost in the quarterfinals of the ASUN tournament to Florida Gulf Coast.

== Previous season ==
The Bisons finished the 2019–20 season 16–16, 9–7 in ASUN play to finish in a tie for third place. In the quarterfinals of the ASUN tournament, the #3 seeded Bisons defeated the #6 seed Florida Gulf Coast, 68–63, advancing to the semifinals, where they matched up against the #2 seed North Florida, winning 73–71, advancing to the ASUN championship game. In a rematch of the previous year's title game, the Bisons faced top seeded Liberty, ultimately falling 57–73, for the second consecutive year.

== Roster ==
2020–21 Lipscomb Bisons men's basketball team
Players
Coaches

Pos.	#	Name	Height	Weight	Year	Previous school	Hometown
G	0	KJ Johnson	6 ft 2 in (1.88 m)	170 lb (77 kg)	So	Marshall County High School	Lewisburg, Tennessee
G	1	Greg Jones	6 ft 3 in (1.91 m)	195 lb (88 kg)	Jr	Wakeland High School	Frisco, Texas
G	2	Will Pruitt	6 ft 3 in (1.91 m)	195 lb (88 kg)	Fr	Mount Juliet High School	Mount Juliet, Tennessee
G	3	Romeao Ferguson	6 ft 5 in (1.96 m)	195 lb (88 kg)	GS	Belmont Abbey	Burlington, NC
G	4	Tanner Shulman	6 ft 4 in (1.93 m)	195 lb (88 kg)	RS Fr	McCallie School	Chattanooga, Tennessee
F	5	Kaleb Coleman	6 ft 6 in (1.98 m)	215 lb (98 kg)	So	Oak Ridge High School	Orlando, Florida
G	10	Jake Wolfe	6 ft 5 in (1.96 m)	195 lb (88 kg)	RS So	Aurora Christian School	Aurora, Illinois
G	11	Alex Jones	5 ft 9 in (1.75 m)	170 lb (77 kg)	RS So	Buford High School	Alpharetta, Georgia
G	12	Carson Cary	6 ft 2 in (1.88 m)	175 lb (79 kg)	So	Columbia Academy	Columbia, Tennessee
F	13	Parker Hazen	6 ft 8 in (2.03 m)	215 lb (98 kg)	Sr	Iowa Western CC	Columbia City, Indiana
G	14	Tommy Murr	6 ft 0 in (1.83 m)	160 lb (73 kg)	Fr	Lindsey Lane Christian School	Athens, Georgia
F	15	Ed Eubanks	6 ft 4 in (1.93 m)	195 lb (88 kg)	So	Ensworth School	Franklin, Tennessee
F	22	Jacob Hobbs	6 ft 7 in (2.01 m)	195 lb (88 kg)	So	Central Hardin High School	Elizabethtown, Kentucky
C	23	Ahsan Asadullah	6 ft 8 in (2.03 m)	260 lb (118 kg)	RS Jr	North Clayton High School	Atlanta, Georgia
G	25	Miles Miller	6 ft 2 in (1.88 m)	170 lb (77 kg)	RS So	Ole Miss	Meridian, Mississippi
F	35	Luke Howard	6 ft 8 in (2.03 m)	220 lb (100 kg)	RS Fr	Harding Academy	Vancouver, Canada

Head coach

- Lennie Acuff (Shorter)

Assistant coach(es)

- Kevin Carroll (Berry)
- Roger Idstrom (Mars Hill)
- Tyler Murray (Hampden–Sydney)

Legend

- (C) Team captain
- (S) Suspended
- (I) Ineligible
- (W) Walk-on
- Injured
- Current redshirt

Roster
Last update: November 28, 2020

== Schedule and results ==
Date time, TV	Rank^{#}	Opponent^{#}	Result	Record	Site (attendance) city, state
Regular season
November 28, 2020*; 4:00 pm, YouTube		vs. Lamar; Tulane Classic	W 76–73	1–0	Devlin Fieldhouse (100); New Orleans, LA
November 29, 2020*; 1:00 pm, ESPN+		at Tulane; Tulane Classic	L 66–68	1–1	Devlin Fieldhouse (100); New Orleans, LA
December 2, 2020*; 4:00 pm, ESPN+		at Cincinnati	L 55–67	1–2	Fifth Third Arena (300); Cincinnati, OH
December 5, 2020*; 5:00 pm, SECN+		at Arkansas	L 50–86	1–3	Bud Walton Arena (4,266); Fayetteville, AR
December 7, 2020*; 6:30 pm, ESPN+		at Southeast Missouri State	L 77–82	1–4	Show Me Center (580); Cape Girardeau, MO
December 9, 2020*; 7:00 pm, ESPN+		Southeast Missouri State	W 80–74 ^{OT}	2–4	Allen Arena (488); Nashville, TN
December 12, 2020*; 7:00 pm, ESPN+		Belmont; Battle of the Boulevard	L 71–81	2–5	Allen Arena; Nashville, TN
December 15, 2020*; 7:00 pm, ESPN+		Trevecca Nazarene	W 61–45	3–5	Allen Arena (583); Nashville, TN
December 21, 2020*; 7:00 pm, ESPN+		Crowley's Ridge	W 97–60	4–5	Allen Arena; Nashville, TN
December 29, 2020*; 7:00 pm, ESPN+		Freed–Hardeman	W 93–72	5–5	Allen Arena (761); Nashville, TN
January 1, 2021; 3:00 pm, ESPN+		Liberty	W 77–70	6–5 (1–0)	Allen Arena (820); Nashville, TN
January 2, 2021; 4:00 pm, ESPN+		Liberty	L 50–66	6–6 (1–1)	Allen Arena (863); Nashville, TN
January 8, 2021; 6:00 pm, ESPN+		at Bellarmine	W 77–72	7–6 (2–1)	Freedom Hall (1,056); Louisville, KY
January 9, 2021; 4:00 pm, ESPN+		at Bellarmine	W 65–58	8–6 (3–1)	Freedom Hall (749); Louisville, KY
January 15, 2021; 7:00 pm, ESPN+		North Florida	W 84–72	9–6 (4–1)	Allen Arena (759); Nashville, TN
January 16, 2021; 5:00 pm, ESPN+		North Florida	L 67–72	9–7 (4–2)	Allen Arena (735); Nashville, TN
January 22, 2021; 7:00 pm, ESPN+		Florida Gulf Coast	L 69–79	9–8 (4–3)	Allen Arena (756); Nashville, TN
January 23, 2021; 7:00 pm, ESPN+		Florida Gulf Coast	W 71–56	10–8 (5–3)	Allen Arena (810); Nashville, TN
January 29, 2021; 6:00 pm, ESPN+		at Stetson	Postponed		Edmunds Center; DeLand, FL
January 30, 2021; 4:00 pm, ESPN+		at Stetson	Postponed		Edmunds Center; DeLand, FL
January 30, 2021*; 2:00 pm, ESPN+		Bluefield State	W 89–56	11–8	Allen Arena; Nashville, TN
February 5, 2021; 7:00 pm, ESPN+		at Stetson	L 68–73	11–9 (5–4)	Edmunds Center (50); DeLand, FL
February 6, 2021; 7:00 pm, ESPN+		at Stetson	W 69–61	12–9 (6–4)	Edmunds Center (50); DeLand, FL
February 12, 2021; 6:00 pm, ESPN+		at Jacksonville	L 60–66	12–10 (6–5)	Swisher Gymnasium (190); Jacksonville, FL
February 13, 2021; 5:00 pm, ESPN+		at Jacksonville	W 71–69	13–10 (7–5)	Swisher Gymnasium (180); Jacksonville, FL
February 19, 2021; 7:00 pm, ESPN+		Kennesaw State	W 76–62	14–10 (8–5)	Allen Arena (943); Nashville, TN
February 20, 2021; 7:00 pm, ESPN+		Kennesaw State	W 77–63	15–10 (9–5)	Allen Arena (984); Nashville, TN
February 27, 2021; 2:00 pm, ESPN+		at North Alabama	L 66–73	15–11 (9–6)	Flowers Hall (414); Florence, AL
Atlantic Sun tournament
March 4, 2021; 6:00 pm, ESPN+	(3)	vs. (6) Florida Gulf Coast; Quarterfinals	L 60–72	15–12	Swisher Gymnasium (87); Jacksonville, FL
*Non-conference game. ^{#}Rankings from AP Poll. (#) Tournament seedings in parentheses. All times are in Central.
