= Lanett City School District =

School district in Alabama, United States

Address
- 105 North Lanier Avenue Lanett, Alabama, 36863; United States
- Coordinates: 32.868213°N 85.191384°W

District information
- Type: Public
- Grades: PreK–12
- NCES District ID: 0101980

Students and staff
- Students: 966
- Teachers: 57.0
- Staff: 50.85
- Student–teacher ratio: 16.95

Other information
- Website: www.lanettcityschools.org

Lanett City School District is a school district in Chambers County, Alabama, United States. It was established in 1898.

== Schools ==
Lanett Senior High School was recognized in the National Ranking and earned a Bronze Medal by U.S. News & World Report in 2017, 2015, 2014, and 2013. Schools are ranked based on their performance on state-required tests and how well they prepare students for college.

The Public Affairs Research Council of Alabama showed that Lanett High exceeds state average of graduates enrolled in Higher Education as of 2015.

W.O. Lance Elementary was awarded the CLAS School of Distinction Award for its innovative Wellness Clinic. The CLAS School of Distinction Award recognizes schools or programs that serve as outstanding educational models for other schools in Alabama.

Statewide testing ranks the schools in Alabama. Those in the bottom six percent are listed as "failing." As of early 2018, Lanett Senior High School was included in this category.

== Athletics ==
Lanett High School won the Boys' 2A State Basketball Championship in 2016.

Lanett High School won the Boys' 2A State Basketball Championship and the State 2A Football Championship in 2017.
