= Mark Smith (basketball) =

American basketball player (born 1999)

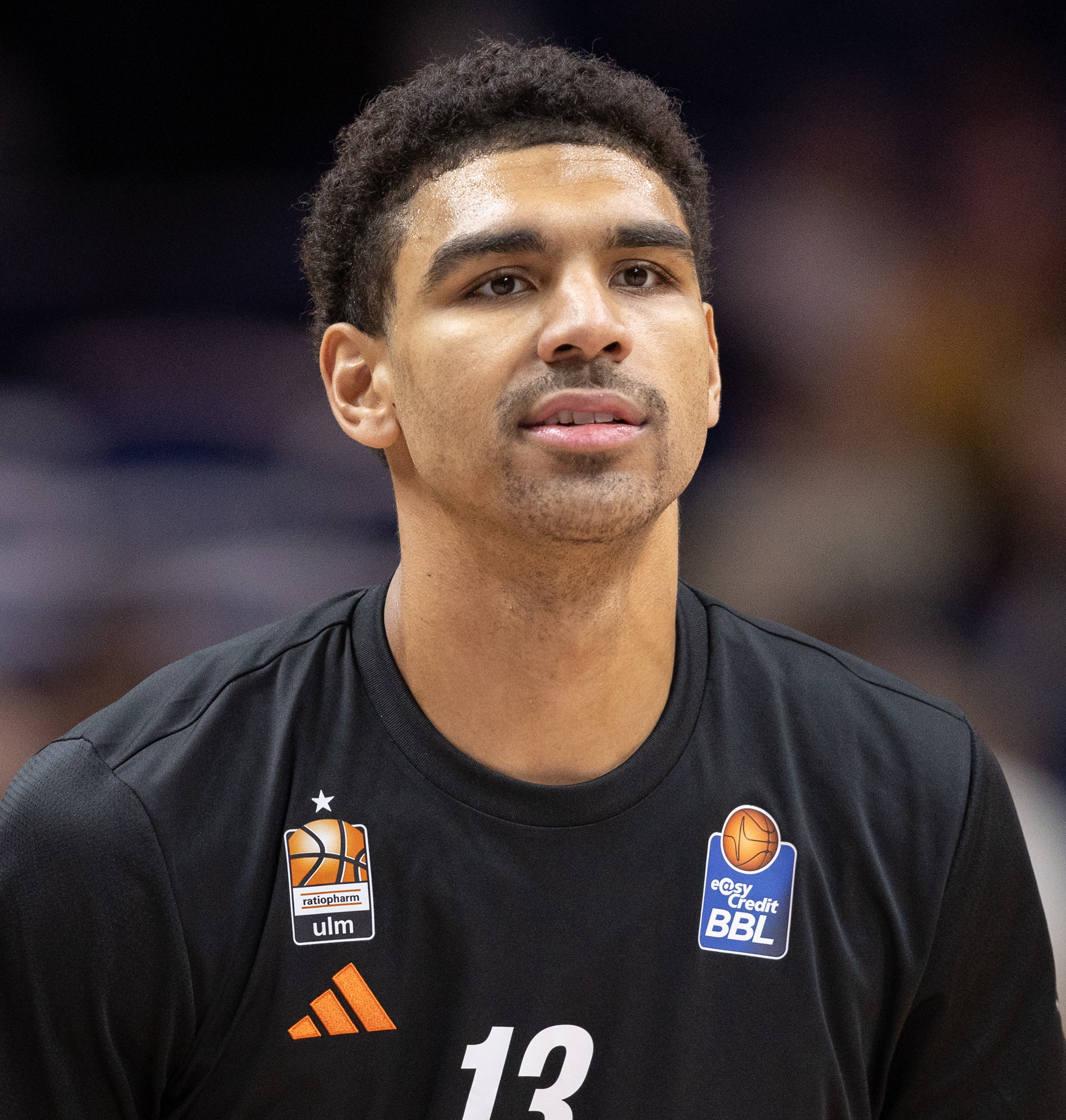
- Smith with ratiopharm Ulm in 2025

No. 13 – Free Agent
- Position: Shooting guard

Personal information
- Born: August 16, 1999 (age 26) Decatur, Illinois, U.S.
- Listed height: 6 ft 4 in (1.93 m)
- Listed weight: 225 lb (102 kg)

Career information
- High school: Edwardsville (Edwardsville, Illinois)
- College: Illinois (2017–2018); Missouri (2018–2021); Kansas State (2021–2022)
- Playing career: 2022–present

Career history
- 2022–2023: BG Göttingen
- 2023–2024: Casademont Zaragoza
- 2024–2025: Nagasaki Velca
- 2025–2026: Ratiopharm Ulm

Career highlights
- Third-team All-Big 12 (2022); Big 12 All-Newcomer Team (2022); Illinois Mr. Basketball (2017)

Mark Anthony Smith (born August 16, 1999) is an American professional basketball player who last played for Ratiopharm Ulm of the German Basketball Bundesliga. He previously played for the Illinois Fighting Illini, the Missouri Tigers, and the Kansas State Wildcats.

== Early life ==
Smith is the son of Anthony and Yvonne Smith. His father, Anthony, played college basketball at Southern Illinois and SIU Edwardsville and his mother, Yvonne, also played college basketball at SIU Edwardsville. As a child, Smith was a three-sport athlete, competing in baseball, basketball, and football. While in high school, Smith participated in AAU basketball with the Ramey Jets United program through the Adidas circuit.

== High school career ==
As a high school senior, he led Edwardsville to a number one ranking in Illinois for the first time in history while averaging 22 points, eight rebounds, and eight assists, and was named to the first-team Associated Press All-state team. Smith was also selected as the 2017 Illinois Boys Basketball Gatorade Player of the Year and as 2017 Illinois Mr. Basketball.

=== Recruiting ===
During his junior year of high school, Smith originally committed to play college baseball for Missouri as a right-handed pitcher. However, in July 2016 Smith decommitted from Missouri given Tim Jamieson's retirement and because of an injury to the flexor pronator tendon in his throwing elbow. Prior to switching his athletic focus to basketball, Smith featured a fastball in the low-90s and was considered a major league baseball prospect out of high school.

On April 26, 2017, Smith announced he would attend college at the University of Illinois to play for the Fighting Illini under new head coach Brad Underwood. In talking about schools he was considering through the recruitment process, Smith listed Duke and Michigan State as his finalists. Smith also considered scholarship offers from Kentucky and Ohio State.

College recruiting information
Name	Hometown	School	Height	Weight	Commit date
Mark Smith; SG	Edwardsville, IL	Edwardsville (IL)	6 ft 5 in (1.96 m)	200 lb (91 kg)	Apr 27, 2017
Mark Smith; SG	Recruit ratings: Scout: Rivals: 247Sports: ESPN: (82)				
Overall recruit ranking: Scout: 80 Rivals: 55 247Sports: 147 ESPN: —
Note: In many cases, Scout, Rivals, 247Sports, On3, and ESPN may conflict in their listings of height and weight.; In these cases, the average was taken. ESPN grades are on a 100-point scale.; Sources: "Illinois 2017 Basketball Commitments". Rivals.; "2017 Illinois Fighting Illini Recruiting Class". ESPN.; "2017 Team Ranking". Rivals.

== College career ==
On March 5, 2018, he announced he would transfer after playing his freshman season at Illinois. On April 14, 2018, Smith announced he would transfer to Missouri. As a senior, he averaged 9.7 points per game while shooting 31.5 percent from three-point range. He moved to Kansas State as a graduate transfer. Smith was named to the Third Team All-Big 12 as well as the All-Newcomer Team.

== Professional career ==
On July 5, 2022, he has signed with BG Göttingen of the Basketball Bundesliga.

On July 29, 2023, he signed with Casademont Zaragoza of the Liga ACB.

On July 5, 2024, he signed with Nagasaki Velca of the Japanese B.League.

On July 21, 2025, he signed with Ratiopharm Ulm of the German Basketball Bundesliga.

== Career statistics ==
Legend
GP	Games played	GS	Games started	MPG	Minutes per game
FG%	Field goal percentage	3P%	3-point field goal percentage	FT%	Free throw percentage
RPG	Rebounds per game	APG	Assists per game	SPG	Steals per game
BPG	Blocks per game	PPG	Points per game	**Bold**	Career high

=== College ===
Year	Team	GP	GS	MPG	FG%	3P%	FT%	RPG	APG	SPG	BPG	PPG
2017–18	Illinois	**31**	18	19.1	.337	.232	**.796**	1.4	1.4	.6	.1	5.8
2018–19	Missouri	19	16	28.4	**.436**	**.450**	.774	5.2	1.6	.7	.1	11.4
2019–20	Missouri	24	20	26.7	.393	.371	.735	3.9	.8	.9	.0	10.0
2020–21	Missouri	26	24	29.6	.372	.315	.765	3.2	1.0	1.0	**.2**	9.7
2021–22	Kansas State	**31**	**31**	**31.7**	**.449**	.362	.709	**8.4**	**1.7**	**1.1**	.0	**12.7**
Career		131	111	26.9	.402	.354	.745	4.4	1.3	.8	.1	9.8
