= Da'Monte Williams =

American basketball player (born 1998)

Personal information
- Born: November 2, 1998 (age 28) Peoria, Illinois
- Listed height: 6 ft 3 in (1.91 m)
- Listed weight: 215 lb (98 kg)

Career information
- High school: Manual (Peoria, Illinois)
- College: Illinois (2017–2022)
- NBA draft: 2022: undrafted
- Playing career: 2022–2023
- Position: Shooting guard
- Number: 20

Career history
- 2022-2023: U.D. Oliveirense

Da'Monte Williams (born November 2, 1998) is an American former professional basketball player. Williams previously played professionally for U.D. Oliveirense. Williams played college basketball for the Illinois Fighting Illini of the Big Ten Conference.

== High school career ==
Williams played his high school career at Manual High School, playing on varsity all four years. As a junior, Williams averaged 15.3 points, 5.9 rebounds, 2.3 assists, and 2.1 steals a game as he helped lead Manual into third-place at the IHSA Class 3A State Championship. Individually, Williams was awarded the Associated Press 3A All-State First-Team, the Illinois Basketball Coaches Association Class 3A/4A All-State First-team, the Champaign News-Gazette Second-team All-State, and the Peoria Journal-Star All-Area Co-Player of the Year. However, William's high school career came to an abrupt end after he tore his ACL in the fourth game of season. Williams signed his National Letter of Intent on November 9, 2016.

=== Recruiting ===
On February 28, 2016, Williams verbally committed to play Illinois and John Groce over offers from high-major schools like Indiana and Cincinnati. In March 2017, Williams remained committed to playing for Illinois after Brad Underwood was hired to replace Groce as head coach.

College recruiting
Name	Hometown	School	Height	Weight	Commit date
Da'Monte Williams; PG	Peoria, IL	Manual (IL)	6 ft 2 in (1.88 m)	180 lb (82 kg)	Feb 28, 2016
Da'Monte Williams; PG	Recruit ratings: Rivals: 247Sports: ESPN: (83)				
Overall recruit ranking: Rivals: N/A 247Sports: 211 ESPN: 93
Note: In many cases, Scout, Rivals, 247Sports, On3, and ESPN may conflict in their listings of height and weight.; In these cases, the average was taken. ESPN grades are on a 100-point scale.; Sources: "2017 Illinois Basketball Commitment List". Rivals.; "2017 Illinois Basketball Commitment List". Scout.; "2017 Illinois Basketball Commitment List". ESPN.; "Scout.com Team Recruiting Rankings". Scout.; "2017 Team Ranking". Rivals.

== College career ==
In his freshman year, Williams played in every game but one and started three times, averaging 3.5 points, 2.9 rebounds, and 1.1 assists a game. In his sophomore year, he played in every game and made 18 starts, averaging 3.4 points, 3.5 rebounds, and 1.2 assists per game. In his junior year, Williams established himself more as a defender even though his average points were down to 2.8 points a game, he guarded players from the one to four position. In his senior year, he was unanimously voted as captain of the Illini along with Ayo Dosunmu. In this season, Williams averaged 5.5 points, 5.3 rebounds, and 1.7 assists a game, all career highs. Moreover, his advanced stats were up as he set career highs in 15.1 PER and 10.0 box plus/minus. This was mostly likely due to his defensive contributions and his efficiency from three-point range as he shot 54.7%, which lead the nation for players that attempted at least two shots a games. With the NCAA granting an extra year of eligibility due to the COVID-19 pandemic in the United States, Williams returned to play for Illinois for a fifth year. He played in all 33 games, starting 30, and averaged 3.9 points, 5.0 rebounds, and 2.5 assists a game. Moreover, with 159 games, Williams set the school record for the most career games.

== Professional career ==
=== U.D. Oliveirense ===
After graduating, Williams joined U.D. Oliveirense. He appeared in two games in their 22-23 season.

== Post-playing career ==
On August 28, 2023, Williams was sworn in as a police officer in his hometown of Peoria. On August 5, 2025, Williams was attempting to detain a suspect, along with another officer. The man was holding a bat and when officers stepped forward to detain him, the man ran at one officer with his bat raised. Williams ran after the man and the man began to strike Williams with the bat. Williams fired a single shot at the suspect, who then continued to flee on foot. The suspect, identified as Brandon Lewis, was pronounced dead on scene.

== Personal life ==
Williams is the son of former NBA and Illinois basketball player Frank Williams. Williams majored in sociology.

== Career statistics ==
Legend
GP	Games played	GS	Games started	MPG	Minutes per game
FG%	Field goal percentage	3P%	3-point field goal percentage	FT%	Free throw percentage
RPG	Rebounds per game	APG	Assists per game	SPG	Steals per game
BPG	Blocks per game	PPG	Points per game	**Bold**	Career high

=== College ===
Year	Team	GP	GS	MPG	FG%	3P%	FT%	RPG	APG	SPG	BPG	PPG
2017–18	Illinois	31	3	16.9	.337	.225	**.705**	2.9	1.1	.7	.1	3.5
2018–19	Illinois	**33**	18	21.5	.344	.317	.700	3.5	1.2	**.8**	.2	3.4
2019–20	Illinois	31	22	21.6	.347	.283	.700	3.6	1.3	.7	**.4**	2.8
2020–21	Illinois	31	17	24.9	**.515**	**.547**	.681	**5.3**	1.7	**.8**	.3	**5.5**
2021–22	Illinois	**33**	**30**	**28.8**	.307	.325	.531	5.0	**2.5**	**.8**	.3	3.9
Career		159	90	22.8	.366	.354	.670	4.1	1.6	.8	.3	3.8
