= 2020–21 Illinois Fighting Illini men's basketball team =

American college basketball season

2020–21 Illinois Fighting Illini men's basketball

Big Ten tournament champions

NCAA tournament, Second Round
- Conference: Big Ten Conference

Ranking
- Coaches: No. 8
- AP: No. 2
- Record: 24–7 (16–4 Big Ten)
- Head coach: Brad Underwood (4th season)
- Assistant coaches: Orlando Antigua (4th season); Stephen Gentry (2nd season); Ron Coleman (4th season)
- Offensive scheme: Spread
- Base defense: On-the-Line-Up-the-Line, Man
- Captains: Ayo Dosunmu; Da’Monte Williams
- Home arena: State Farm Center

2020–21 Big Ten Conference men's basketball standings
	Conf.				Overall
Team	W		L	PCT	W		L	PCT
No. 4 Michigan	14	–	3	.824	23	–	5	.821
No. 2 Illinois †	16	–	4	.800	24	–	7	.774
No. 8 Iowa	14	–	6	.700	22	–	9	.710
No. 20 Purdue	13	–	6	.684	18	–	10	.643
No. 7 Ohio State	12	–	8	.600	21	–	10	.677
Wisconsin	10	–	10	.500	18	–	13	.581
Rutgers	10	–	10	.500	16	–	12	.571
Maryland	9	–	11	.450	17	–	14	.548
Michigan State	9	–	11	.450	15	–	13	.536
Indiana	7	–	12	.368	12	–	15	.444
Penn State	7	–	12	.368	11	–	14	.440
Northwestern	6	–	13	.316	9	–	15	.375
Minnesota	6	–	14	.300	14	–	15	.483
Nebraska	3	–	16	.158	7	–	20	.259
† Conference tournament winner Rankings from AP poll

The 2020–21 Illinois Fighting Illini men's basketball team represented the University of Illinois in the 2020–21 NCAA Division I men's basketball season. Led by fourth-year head coach Brad Underwood, the Illini played their home games at the State Farm Center in Champaign, Illinois as members of the Big Ten Conference. They finished the season 24–7, 16–4 in Big Ten play to finish in second place. They defeated Rutgers, Iowa, and Ohio State to win the Big Ten tournament and receive the conference's automatic bid to the NCAA tournament. Making their first tournament appearance since 2013. They entered as the No. 1 seed in the Midwest region, they defeated Drexel in the First Round before being upset by No. 8-seeded Loyola–Chicago in the Second Round.

== Previous season ==
The Illini finished the 2019–20 season 21–10, 13–7 in Big Ten play to finish in fourth place. Their season ended when the Big Ten tournament and the NCAA tournament were canceled due to the coronavirus pandemic.

== Offseason ==
On April 7, 2020, freshman big man Kofi Cockburn declared for the NBA draft, but did not hire an agent, leaving open the chance that he would return to school for his sophomore season. On April 16, sophomore guard Ayo Dosunmu also declared for the draft. Dosunmu did not hire an agent, but stated that he intended to stay in the draft. On July 31, Cockburn and Dosunmu announced they had withdrawn from the NBA draft and would return to Illinois for the season.

=== Departures ===
Name	Number	Pos.	Height	Weight	Year	Hometown	Notes
Andrés Feliz	10	G	6'2"	195	Senior	Santo Domingo, Dominican Republic	Graduated
Alan Griffin	0	F	6'5"	195	Sophomore	White Plains, NY	Transferred to Syracuse
Tevian Jones	5	F	6'7"	205	Sophomore	Culver City, CA	Transferred to Southern Utah
Kipper Nichols	2	F	6'6"	220	RS Senior	Cleveland, Ohio	Graduated
Samson Oladimeji	35	C	6'4"	210	Senior	Rolling Meadows, Illinois	Graduated

=== 2020 Recruiting Class ===
College recruiting information
Name	Hometown	School	Height	Weight	Commit date
André Curbelo; PG	San Juan, Puerto Rico	Long Island Lutheran (NY)	6 ft 1 in (1.85 m)	175 lb (79 kg)	Nov 3, 2019
André Curbelo; PG	Recruit ratings: Rivals: 247Sports: ESPN: (83)				
Coleman Hawkins; PF	Antelope, California	Prolific Prep	6 ft 10 in (2.08 m)	215 lb (98 kg)	Nov 16, 2019
Coleman Hawkins; PF	Recruit ratings: Rivals: 247Sports: ESPN: (80)				
Adam Miller; SG	Chicago, Illinois	Morgan Park	6 ft 3 in (1.91 m)	170 lb (77 kg)	Nov 21, 2019
Adam Miller; SG	Recruit ratings: Rivals: 247Sports: ESPN: (89)				
Brandon Lieb; C	Deerfield, Illinois	Deerfield	7 ft 0 in (2.13 m)	205 lb (93 kg)	Jun 25, 2020
Brandon Lieb; C	Recruit ratings: Rivals: 247Sports:				
Overall recruit ranking: Rivals: 15 247Sports: 16 On3: 26
Note: In many cases, Scout, Rivals, 247Sports, On3, and ESPN may conflict in their listings of height and weight.; In these cases, the average was taken. ESPN grades are on a 100-point scale.; Sources: "2020 Illinois Commits". Rivals.; "ESPN- Illinois Fighting Illini Men's Basketball Recruiting". ESPN.; "2020 Team Ranking". Rivals.; "2020–21 Illinois Fighting Illini men's basketball team". 247Sports.; "2020–21 Illinois Fighting Illini men's basketball team". On3.

== Roster ==
2020–21 Illinois Fighting Illini men's basketball team
Players
Coaches

Pos.	#	Name	Height	Weight	Year	Previous school	Hometown
G	1	Trent Frazier	6 ft 2 in (1.88 m)	175 lb (79 kg)	Sr	Wellington HS	Wellington, FL
F	2	Connor Serven (W)	6 ft 9 in (2.06 m)	215 lb (98 kg)	Fr	St. Rita HS	Bushnell, IL
G/F	3	Jacob Grandison	6 ft 6 in (1.98 m)	205 lb (93 kg)	RS Jr	Holy Cross	Oakland, CA
F	4	Zach Griffith (W)	6 ft 6 in (1.98 m)	220 lb (100 kg)	Sr	Fisher HS	Fisher, IL
G	5	André Curbelo	6 ft 1 in (1.85 m)	175 lb (79 kg)	Fr	Long Island Lutheran	Vega Baja, P.R.
G	10	Edgar Padilla Jr. (W)	6 ft 1 in (1.85 m)	165 lb (75 kg)	Fr	Colegio San Ignacio de Loyola	Carolina, P.R.
G	11	Ayo Dosunmu (C)	6 ft 5 in (1.96 m)	200 lb (91 kg)	Jr	Morgan Park HS	Chicago, IL
C	12	Brandon Lieb	7 ft 0 in (2.13 m)	210 lb (95 kg)	Fr	Deerfield HS	Deerfield, IL
F	13	Benjamin Bosmans-Verdonk	6 ft 8 in (2.03 m)	235 lb (107 kg)	RS Fr	KA Pegasus	Lommel, Belgium
F	15	Giorgi Bezhanishvili	6 ft 9 in (2.06 m)	245 lb (111 kg)	Jr	The Patrick School	Rustavi, Georgia
G	20	Da'Monte Williams (C)	6 ft 3 in (1.91 m)	215 lb (98 kg)	Sr	Manual	Peoria, IL
C	21	Kofi Cockburn	7 ft 0 in (2.13 m)	297 lb (135 kg)	So	Oak Hill Academy	Kingston, Jamaica
G	22	Austin Hutcherson (injured)	6 ft 6 in (1.98 m)	180 lb (82 kg)	RS Jr	Wesleyan	New York, NY
G	32	Tyler Underwood (W)	6 ft 2 in (1.88 m)	180 lb (82 kg)	GS	Oklahoma State	Nacogdoches, TX
F	33	Coleman Hawkins	6 ft 10 in (2.08 m)	200 lb (91 kg)	Fr	Prolific Prep	Sacramento, CA
C	34	Jermaine Hamlin	6 ft 10 in (2.08 m)	235 lb (107 kg)	So	Lincoln Community HS	Lincoln, IL
G	44	Adam Miller	6 ft 3 in (1.91 m)	180 lb (82 kg)	Fr	Morgan Park HS	Peoria, IL

Head coach

- Brad Underwood (Kansas State)

Assistant coach(es)

- Orlando Antigua (Pittsburgh)
- Ron Coleman (Lamar)
- Stephen Gentry (Gonzaga)

Legend

- (C) Team captain
- (S) Suspended
- (I) Ineligible
- (W) Walk-on
- Injured
- Current redshirt

Roster
Last update: October 10, 2020

== Schedule and results ==
Date time, TV	Rank^{#}	Opponent^{#}	Result	Record	High points	High rebounds	High assists	Site (attendance) city, state
Non-Conference regular season
November 25, 2020*; 1:00 pm, BTN	No. 8	North Carolina A&T	W 122–60	1–0	28 – Tied	10 – Tied	7 – Williams	State Farm Center (132); Champaign, IL
November 26, 2020*; 11:00 am, BTN	No. 8	Chicago State	W 97–38	2–0	22 – Dosunmu	11 – Cockburn	7 – Dosunmu	State Farm Center (143); Champaign, IL
November 27, 2020*; 12:00 pm, BTN	No. 8	Ohio	W 77–75	3–0	27 – Dosunmu	14 – Cockburn	8 – Dosunmu	State Farm Center (155); Champaign, IL
December 2, 2020*; 9:00 pm, ESPN	No. 5	vs. No. 2 Baylor; Jimmy V Classic	L 69–82	3–1	18 – Dosunmu	7 – Williams	5 – Dosunmu	Bankers Life Fieldhouse (0); Indianapolis, IN
December 5, 2020*; 8:00 pm, BTN	No. 5	UT-Martin	Canceled due to COVID-19 within UT-Martin program					State Farm Center; Champaign, IL
December 8, 2020*; 8:30 pm, ESPN	No. 6	at No. 10 Duke; ACC–Big Ten Challenge	W 83–68	4–1	18 – Dosunmu	12 – Dosunmu	5 – Dosunmu	Cameron Indoor Stadium (0); Durham, NC
December 12, 2020*; 7:00 pm, ESPNU	No. 6	at Missouri; Braggin' Rights	L 78–81	4–2	36 – Dosunmu	6 – Cockburn	4 – Curbelo	Mizzou Arena (578); Columbia, MO
Big Ten regular season
December 15, 2020; 6:00 pm, ESPN2	No. 13	Minnesota	W 92–65	5–2 (1–0)	33 – Cockburn	13 – Cockburn	9 – Curbelo	State Farm Center (173); Champaign, IL
December 20, 2020; 12:00 pm, ESPN2	No. 13	at No. 19 Rutgers	L 88–91	5–3 (1–1)	22 – Dosunmu	12 – Cockburn	6 – Dosunmu	Rutgers Athletic Center (0); Piscataway, NJ
December 23, 2020; 5:30 pm, BTN	No. 18	at Penn State	W 98–81	6–3 (2–1)	30 – Dosunmu	7 – Grandison	8 – Curbelo	Bryce Jordan Center (158); University Park, PA
December 26, 2020; 3:00 pm, FS1	No. 18	Indiana; Rivalry	W 69–60	7–3 (3–1)	30 – Dosunmu	15 – Cockburn	5 – Dosunmu	State Farm Center (178); Champaign, IL
January 2, 2021; 5:00 pm, BTN	No. 15	Purdue	W 66–58	8–3 (4–1)	14 – Cockburn	10 – Tied	6 – Curbelo	State Farm Center (167); Champaign, IL
January 7, 2021; 8:00 pm, BTN	No. 12	at Northwestern; Rivalry	W 81–56	9–3 (5–1)	18 – Cockburn	12 – Cockburn	7 – Curbelo	Welsh–Ryan Arena (0); Evanston, IL
January 10, 2021; 7:00 pm, BTN	No. 12	Maryland	L 63–66	9–4 (5–2)	23 – Dosunmu	10 – Cockburn	5 – Tied	State Farm Center (169); Champaign, IL
January 16, 2021; 11:00 am, FOX	No. 14	No. 21 Ohio State	L 81–87	9–5 (5–3)	22 – Dosunmu	11 – Cockburn	5 – Dosunmu	State Farm Center (175); Champaign, IL
January 19, 2021; 7:30 pm, BTN	No. 22	Penn State	W 79–65	10–5 (6–3)	21 – Cockburn	12 – Cockburn	5 – Dosunmu	State Farm Center (148); Champaign, IL
January 29, 2021; 8:00 pm, FS1	No. 19	No. 7 Iowa; Rivalry	W 80–75	11–5 (7–3)	25 – Dosunmu	10 – Tied	8 – Curbelo	State Farm Center (190); Champaign, IL
February 2, 2021; 8:00 pm, ESPN	No. 12	at Indiana; Rivalry	W 75–71 ^{OT}	12–5 (8–3)	19 – Frazier	10 – Cockburn	4 – Curbelo	Assembly Hall (0); Bloomington, IN
February 6, 2021; 1:30 pm, FOX	No. 12	No. 19 Wisconsin	W 75–60	13–5 (9–3)	23 – Cockburn	14 – Cockburn	12 – Dosunmu	State Farm Center (180); Champaign, IL
February 12, 2021; 8:00 pm, BTN	No. 6	at Nebraska	W 77–72 ^{OT}	14–5 (10–3)	31 – Dosunmu	13 – Cockburn	6 – Dosunmu	Pinnacle Bank Arena (0); Lincoln, NE
February 16, 2021; 8:00 pm, BTN	No. 5	Northwestern; Rivalry	W 73–66	15–5 (11–3)	17 – Cockburn	10 – Cockburn	5 – Tied	State Farm Center (162); Champaign, IL
February 20, 2021; 2:30 pm, FOX	No. 5	at Minnesota	W 94–63	16–5 (12–3)	22 – Cockburn	10 – Dosunmu	10 – Dosunmu	Williams Arena (56); Minneapolis, MN
February 23, 2021; 6:00 pm, FS1	No. 5	at Michigan State	L 72–81	16–6 (12–4)	22 – Frazier	9 – Dosunmu	5 – Dosunmu	Breslin Center (0); East Lansing, MI
February 25, 2021; 6:00 pm, BTN	No. 5	Nebraska; Senior Night	W 86–70	17–6 (13–4)	24 – Cockburn	12 – Curbelo	8 – Curbelo	State Farm Center (192); Champaign, IL
February 27, 2021; 1:00 pm, ESPN	No. 5	at No. 23 Wisconsin	W 74–69	18–6 (14–4)	19 – Cockburn	8 – Grandison	4 – Tied	Kohl Center (0); Madison, WI
March 2, 2021; 6:00 pm, ESPN	No. 4	at No. 2 Michigan	W 76–53	19–6 (15–4)	22 – Frazier	7 – Cockburn	5 – Grandison	Crisler Center (94); Ann Arbor, MI
March 6, 2021; 3:00 pm, ESPN	No. 4	at No. 7 Ohio State	W 73–68	20–6 (16–4)	19 – Tie	6 – Tie	6 – Curbelo	Value City Arena; Columbus, OH
Big Ten tournament
March 12, 2021; 5:30 pm, BTN	(2) No. 3	vs. (7) Rutgers; Quarterfinals	W 90–68	21–6	23 – Dosunmu	12 – Cockburn	6 – Dosunmu	Lucas Oil Stadium (7,735); Indianapolis, IN
March 13, 2021; 2:30 pm, CBS	(2) No. 3	vs. (3) No. 5 Iowa; Semifinals	W 82–71	22–6	26 – Cockburn	9 – Williams	9 – Dosunmu	Lucas Oil Stadium (8,000); Indianapolis, IN
March 14, 2021; 2:30 pm, CBS	(2) No. 3	vs. (5) No. 9 Ohio State; Championship	W 91–88 ^{OT}	23–6	16 – Tied	9 – Tied	5 – Curbelo	Lucas Oil Stadium (8,000); Indianapolis, IN
NCAA tournament
March 19, 2021; 12:15 pm, TBS	(1 MW) No. 2	vs. (16 MW) Drexel; First Round	W 78–49	24–6	18 – Cockburn	10 – Dosunmu	6 – Dosunmu	Indiana Farmers Coliseum (968); Indianapolis, IN
March 21, 2021; 11:10 am, CBS	(1 MW) No. 2	vs. (8 MW) No. 17 Loyola–Chicago; Second Round	L 58–71	24–7	21 – Cockburn	9 – Cockburn	7 – Curbelo	Bankers Life Fieldhouse (3,670); Indianapolis, IN
*Non-conference game. ^{#}Rankings from AP Poll. (#) Tournament seedings in parentheses. All times are in Central Time.

== Rankings ==
Ranking movements Legend: ██ Increase in ranking ██ Decrease in ranking
	Week																	
Poll	Pre	1	2	3	4	5	6	7	8	9	10	11	12	13	14	15	16	Final
AP	8	5	6	13	18	15	12	14	22	19	12	6	5	5	4	3	2	Not released
Coaches	10	10^	9	13	18	16	12	13	24	22	13	6	5	4	4	3	2	8

*AP does not release post-NCAA Tournament rankings
^Coaches did not release a Week 1 poll.
