= 2017–18 Illinois Fighting Illini men's basketball team =

American college basketball season

2017–18 Illinois Fighting Illini men's basketball
- Conference: Big Ten Conference
- Record: 14–18 (4–14 Big Ten)
- Head coach: Brad Underwood (1st season)
- Assistant coaches: Orlando Antigua (1st season); Jamall Walker (6th season); Ron Coleman (1st season)
- Captain: Leron Black
- Home arena: State Farm Center

2017–18 Big Ten Conference men's basketball standings
	Conf.				Overall
Team	W		L	PCT	W		L	PCT
No. 5 Michigan State	16	–	2	.889	30	–	5	.857
No. 11 Purdue	15	–	3	.833	30	–	7	.811
No. 17 Ohio State	15	–	3	.833	25	–	9	.735
No. 7 Michigan †	13	–	5	.722	33	–	8	.805
Nebraska	13	–	5	.722	22	–	11	.667
Penn State	9	–	9	.500	26	–	13	.667
Indiana	9	–	9	.500	16	–	15	.516
Maryland	8	–	10	.444	19	–	13	.594
Wisconsin	7	–	11	.389	15	–	18	.455
Northwestern	6	–	12	.333	15	–	17	.469
Minnesota	4	–	14	.222	15	–	17	.469
Illinois	4	–	14	.222	14	–	18	.438
Iowa	4	–	14	.222	14	–	19	.424
Rutgers	3	–	15	.167	15	–	19	.441
† 2018 Big Ten tournament winner Rankings from AP poll

The 2017–18 Illinois Fighting Illini men's basketball team represented the University of Illinois at Urbana–Champaign in the 2017–18 NCAA Division I men's basketball season. Led by first-year head coach Brad Underwood, the Illini played their home games at State Farm Center in Champaign, Illinois as members of the Big Ten Conference. They finished the season 14–18, 4–14 in Big Ten play to finish in a three-way tie for 11th place. As the No. 13 seed in the Big Ten tournament, they lost in the first round to Iowa.

== Previous season ==
The Illini finished the 2016–17 season 20–15, 8–10 in Big Ten play to finish in ninth place. They lost in the second round of the Big Ten tournament to Michigan. They received an invitation to the National Invitation Tournament where they defeated Valparaiso and Boise State before losing in the quarterfinals to UCF.

On March 11, 2017, Illinois fired head coach John Groce. On March 18, the school hired Brad Underwood as the new head coach.

== Offseason ==
=== Coaching changes ===
Following Brad Underwood's hiring as head coach, Jamall Walker was retained as an assistant. Underwood hired controversial former South Florida head coach Orlando Antigua who was fired as head coach from South Florida due to an NCAA investigation into academic violations. Underwood also hired Ron Coleman as an assistant and Stephen Gentry as assistant to the head coach.

=== Player departures ===
Name	Number	Pos.	Height	Weight	Year	Hometown	Notes
D. J. Williams	0	G	6'7"	210	Sophomore	Chicago, Illinois	Transfer to George Washington
Jaylon Tate	1	G	6'3"	170	Senior	Chicago, Illinois	Graduated and pro for Niagara River Lions
Jalen Coleman-Lands	5	G	6'3"	190	Sophomore	Indianapolis, Indiana	Transfer to DePaul
Tracy Abrams	13	G	6'2"	185	Graduate student	Chicago, Illinois	Graduated
Malcolm Hill	21	G	6'6"	225	Senior	Fairview Heights, Illinois	Graduated
Maverick Morgan	22	C	6'10"	245	Senior	Springboro, Ohio	Graduated and pro for GTK Gliwice
Mike Thorne Jr.	33	C	6'11"	280	Graduate student	Fayetteville, North Carolina	Graduated
Alex Austin	44	G	6'4"	190	Senior	Chicago, Illinois	Graduated

=== Decommits ===
On January 16, 2016, three-star shooting guard Javon Pickett of Belleville, Illinois verbally committed to attend Illinois in the fall of 2017. After the firing of John Groce, Pickett asked for and received a release of his letter of intent to Illinois. On November 17, 2016, four-star recruit Jeremiah Tilmon announced that he had signed his letter of intent with Illinois the previous day, after a week of press uncertainty. However, after the coaching change at Illinois, Tilmon requested and received a release of his letter of intent with the school.

=== Incoming transfers ===
College recruiting
Name	Hometown	School	Height	Weight	Commit date
Mark Alstork; PG	Dayton, OH	Thurgood Marshall (OH) / Ball State / Wright State	6 ft 5 in (1.96 m)	190 lb (86 kg)	May 24, 2017
Mark Alstork; PG	Recruit ratings: No ratings found				
Tyler Underwood; PG	Nacogdoches, TX	Nacogdoches (TX) / Oklahoma State	6 ft 2 in (1.88 m)	165 lb (75 kg)	Mar 22, 2017
Tyler Underwood; PG	Recruit ratings: No ratings found				
Overall recruit ranking:
Note: In many cases, Scout, Rivals, 247Sports, On3, and ESPN may conflict in their listings of height and weight.; In these cases, the average was taken. ESPN grades are on a 100-point scale.; Sources:

=== 2017 recruiting class ===
During Illinois' final home game against Minnesota on February 28, 2016, Da'Monte Williams verbally committed to attend Illinois in the fall of 2017. Williams is the son of former Illinois guard Frank Williams who led the Fighting Illini to three straight NCAA men's basketball tournament appearances, including an Elite Eight appearance in 2001. On November 9, 2016 Trent Frazier signed a national letter of intent after considering Memphis, Georgia, Kansas State and Seton Hall, among others. On April 27, 2017, four-star point guard Mark Smith, Mr. Illinois Basketball for 2017, announced he would attend Illinois. On June 12, Slovenian bigman Matic Vesel committed to Illinois.

College recruiting
Name	Hometown	School	Height	Weight	Commit date
Greg Eboigbodin; F	Benin City, NG	University of Detroit Jesuit High School (MI)	6 ft 9 in (2.06 m)	220 lb (100 kg)	Jun 6, 2017
Greg Eboigbodin; F	Recruit ratings: Scout: Rivals: 247Sports: ESPN:				
Trent Frazier; PG	West Palm Beach, FL	Wellington (FL)	6 ft 2 in (1.88 m)	170 lb (77 kg)	Aug 20, 2016
Trent Frazier; PG	Recruit ratings: Scout: Rivals: 247Sports: ESPN:				
Mark Smith; PG	Edwardsville, IL	Edwardsville IL	6 ft 5 in (1.96 m)	225 lb (102 kg)	Apr 27, 2017
Mark Smith; PG	Recruit ratings: Scout: Rivals: 247Sports: ESPN:				
Matic Vesel; F	Ljubljana, RS	Helios Suns Domžale	6 ft 9 in (2.06 m)	196 lb (89 kg)	Jun 12, 2017
Matic Vesel; F	Recruit ratings: No ratings found				
Da'Monte Williams; CG	Peoria, IL	Manual (IL)	6 ft 3 in (1.91 m)	185 lb (84 kg)	Feb 29, 2016
Da'Monte Williams; CG	Recruit ratings: Scout: Rivals: 247Sports: ESPN:				
Overall recruit ranking: 247Sports: 35 On3: 30
Note: In many cases, Scout, Rivals, 247Sports, On3, and ESPN may conflict in their listings of height and weight.; In these cases, the average was taken. ESPN grades are on a 100-point scale.; Sources: "Illinois 2017 Basketball Commitments". Rivals.; "2017 Illinois Basketball Commits". Scout.; "ESPN- Illinois 2017 Basketball Commits". ESPN.; "Scout.com Team Recruiting Rankings". Scout.; "2017 Team Ranking". Rivals.; "Illinois 2017 Basketball Commits". 247Sports.; "2017–18 Illinois Fighting Illini men's basketball team". On3.

== Roster ==
2017–18 Illinois Fighting Illini men's basketball team
Players
Coaches

Pos.	#	Name	Height	Weight	Year	Previous school	Hometown
G	1	Trent Frazier	6 ft 2 in (1.88 m)	170 lb (77 kg)	Fr	Wellington High School (FL)	West Palm Beach, Florida
F	2	Kipper Nichols	6 ft 6 in (1.98 m)	225 lb (102 kg)	RS So	St. Edward High School (OH)	Cleveland, Ohio
G	3	Te'Jon Lucas	6 ft 0 in (1.83 m)	170 lb (77 kg)	So	Washington High School (WI)	Milwaukee, Wisconsin
F	4	Matic Vessel	6 ft 10 in (2.08 m)	215 lb (98 kg)	Fr	Helios Suns Domžale	Ljubljana, Slovenia
G	10	Drew Cayce (W)	6 ft 1 in (1.85 m)	165 lb (75 kg)	RS So	La Lumiere School/Creighton	Libertyville, Illinois
F	11	Greg Eboigbodin	6 ft 9 in (2.06 m)	220 lb (100 kg)	Fr	University of Detroit Jesuit High School	Benin City, Nigeria
F	12	Leron Black (C)	6 ft 7 in (2.01 m)	220 lb (100 kg)	RS Jr	White Station High School	Memphis, Tennessee
G	13	Mark Smith	6 ft 5 in (1.96 m)	225 lb (102 kg)	Fr	Edwardsville High School	Edwardsville, Illinois
G	20	Da'Monte Williams	6 ft 3 in (1.91 m)	185 lb (84 kg)	Fr	Manual High School	Peoria, Illinois
G	23	Aaron Jordan	6 ft 5 in (1.96 m)	190 lb (86 kg)	Jr	Plainfield East High School	Plainfield, Illinois
G	24	Mark Alstork	6 ft 5 in (1.96 m)	190 lb (86 kg)	GS	Thurgood Marshall (OH) / Ball State / Wright State	Dayton, Ohio
G	32	Tyler Underwood	6 ft 2 in (1.88 m)	160 lb (73 kg)	RS So	Nacogdoches High School / Oklahoma State	Nacogdoches, Texas
G	35	Samson Oladimeji (W)	6 ft 4 in (1.93 m)	195 lb (88 kg)	So	William Fremd High School	Rolling Meadows, Illinois
G	41	Clayton Jones (W)	6 ft 0 in (1.83 m)	170 lb (77 kg)	RS Sr	Champaign Central High School/Lake Land	Champaign, Illinois
F	43	Michael Finke	6 ft 10 in (2.08 m)	230 lb (104 kg)	RS Jr	Centennial High School (IL)	Champaign, Illinois
F	45	Cameron Liss (W)	6 ft 6 in (1.98 m)	220 lb (100 kg)	RS Jr	Glenbrook North High School	Northbrook, Illinois

Head coach

- Brad Underwood (Kansas State)

Assistant coach(es)

- Orlando Antigua (Pittsburgh)
- Jamall Walker (Saint Louis)
- Ron Coleman (Lamar)

Legend

- (C) Team captain
- (S) Suspended
- (I) Ineligible
- (W) Walk-on
- Injured
- Current redshirt

Roster

== Schedule and results ==
The 2018 Big Ten tournament was held at Madison Square Garden in New York City. Due to the Big East's use of that venue for their conference tournament, the Big Ten tournament took place one week earlier than usual, ending the week before Selection Sunday. As a result, the Big Ten regular season began in mid-December.

Date time, TV	Rank^{#}	Opponent^{#}	Result	Record	High points	High rebounds	High assists	Site (attendance) city, state
Exhibition
Nov 3, 2017*; 7:00 pm		at Eastern Illinois; Disaster Relief Benefit	L 67–80	–	16 – Nichols	9 – Nichols	4 – Nichols	Lantz Arena; Charleston, IL
Regular season
Nov 10, 2017*; 7:00 pm, BTN+		Southern; Global Sports Invitational	W 102–55	1–0	17 – 2 tied	10 – Alstork	4 – 2 tied	State Farm Center (14,637); Champaign, IL
Nov 12, 2017*; 5:00 pm, ESPNU		UT Martin; Global Sports Invitational	W 77–74	2–0	23 – Black	8 – Black	3 – 3 tied	State Farm Center (11,882); Champaign, IL
Nov 17, 2017*; 7:30 pm, BTN		DePaul; Gavitt Tipoff Games	W 82–73	3–0	21 – Smith	9 – Jordan	3 – 4 tied	State Farm Center (11,254); Champaign, IL
Nov 19, 2017*; 4:00 pm, BTN+		Marshall; Global Sports Invitational	W 91–74	4–0	17 – 2 tied	11 – Nichols	5 – Lucas	State Farm Center (10,022); Champaign, IL
Nov 22, 2017*; 6:00 pm, BTN+		Augustana (IL)	W 96–62	5–0	20 – Finke	10 – Finke	6 – Lucas	State Farm Center (10,404); Champaign, IL
Nov 24, 2017*; 6:30 pm, BTN+		North Carolina Central; Global Sports Invitational	W 86–73	6–0	22 – Finke	8 – Black	6 – Lucas	State Farm Center (11,004); Champaign, IL
Nov 28, 2017*; 8:00 pm, ESPN2		at Wake Forest; ACC–Big Ten Challenge	L 73–80	6–1	20 – Jordan	7 – 2 tied	4 – Lucas	LJVM Coliseum (5,782); Winston-Salem, NC
Dec 1, 2017; 8:00 pm, BTN		at Northwestern; Rivalry	L 68–72 ^{OT}	6–2 (0–1)	15 – Black	7 – 2 tied	3 – Alstork	Allstate Arena (10,017); Rosemont, IL
Dec 3, 2017; 7:00 pm, BTN		Maryland	L 91–92 ^{OT}	6–3 (0–2)	18 – Black	6 – Nichols	7 – Frazier	State Farm Center (12,735); Champaign, IL
Dec 6, 2017*; 7:00 pm, BTN		Austin Peay	W 64–57	7–3	17 – Finke	8 – Finke	4 – Lucas	State Farm Center (12,352); Champaign, IL
Dec. 9, 2017*; 11:00 pm, ESPN2		vs. UNLV; UNLV on the Strip	L 82–89	7–4	17 – Smith	10 – Nichols	4 – Smith	MGM Grand Garden Arena (9,668); Paradise, NV
Dec 13, 2017*; 7:00 pm, BTN		Longwood	W 92–45	8–4	22 – Jordan	8 – Jordan	5 – Lucas	State Farm Center (12,387); Champaign, IL
Dec 16, 2017*; 7:00 pm, BTN		vs. New Mexico State; Lou Henson Classic	L 69–74	8–5	17 – Black	9 – Finke	4 – Alstork	United Center (5,695); Chicago, IL
Dec 23, 2017*; 7:00 pm, ESPN2		vs. Missouri; Braggin' Rights	W 70–64	9–5	22 – Frazier	7 – Black	2 – 2 tied	Scottrade Center (21,289); St. Louis, MO
Dec 30, 2017*; 3:00 pm, BTN+		Grand Canyon	W 62–58	10–5	20 – Black	11 – Black	3 – Williams	State Farm Center (13,762); Champaign, IL
Jan 3, 2018; 8:00 pm, BTN		at Minnesota	L 67–77	10–6 (0–3)	14 – Black	8 – Williams	6 – Frazier	Williams Arena (11,597); Minneapolis, MN
Jan 6, 2018; 11:00 pm, BTN		at Michigan	L 69–79	10–7 (0–4)	17 – Nichols	7 – Nichols	6 – Lucas	Crisler Arena (11,888); Ann Arbor, MI
Jan 11, 2018; 7:00 pm, FS1		Iowa; Rivalry	L 97–104 ^{OT}	10–8 (0–5)	27 – Frazier	5 – Nichols	4 – Jordan	State Farm Center (11,326); Champaign, IL
Jan 15, 2018; 8:00 pm, BTN		at Nebraska	L 63–64	10–9 (0–6)	19 – Frazier	10 – Finke	5 – Frazier	Pinnacle Bank Arena (12,597); Lincoln, NE
Jan 19, 2018; 8:00 pm, FS1		at Wisconsin	L 50–75	10–10 (0–7)	16 – Black	10 – Alstork	5 – Frazier	Kohl Center (17,287); Madison, WI
Jan 22, 2018; 8:00 pm, FS1		No. 6 Michigan State	L 74–87	10–11 (0–8)	27 – Nichols	3 – 2 tied	4 – Williams	State Farm Center (13,552); Champaign, IL
Jan 24, 2018; 8:00 pm, BTN		Indiana; Rivalry	W 73–71	11–11 (1–8)	19 – 2 tied	6 – Black	3 – Frazier	State Farm Center (13,003); Champaign, IL
Jan 30, 2018; 6:00 pm, BTN		Rutgers	W 91–60	12–11 (2–8)	19 – Nichols	6 – Nichols	4 – Frazier	State Farm Center (12,612); Champaign, IL
Feb 4, 2018; 11:00 pm, FS1		at No. 17 Ohio State	L 67–75	12–12 (2–9)	19 – Alstork	4 – Black	4 – Frazier	Value City Arena (18,743); Columbus, OH
Feb 8, 2018; 8:00 pm, BTN		Wisconsin	L 69–78	12–13 (2–10)	32 – Frazier	11 – Black	4 – Lucas	State Farm Center (13,062); Champaign, IL
Feb 11, 2018; 6:00 pm, BTN		Penn State	L 52–74	12–14 (2–11)	18 – Black	6 – 3 tied	2 – 4 tied	State Farm Center (12,840); Champaign, IL
Feb 14, 2018; 7:30 pm, BTN		at Indiana; Rivalry	L 68–78	12–15 (2–12)	20 – Black	7 – Black	5 – Frazier	Simon Skjodt Assembly Hall (17,222); Bloomington, IN
Feb 18, 2018; 2:30 pm, BTN		Nebraska	W 72–66	13–15 (3–12)	28 – Black	7 – 3 tied	6 – Lucas	State Farm Center (15,544); Champaign, IL
Feb 20, 2018; 6:00 pm, ESPN		at No. 2 Michigan State	L 61–81	13–16 (3–13)	20 – Black	6 – Nichols	5 – Frazier	Breslin Center (14,797); East Lansing, MI
Feb 22, 2018; 6:00 pm, FS1		No. 9 Purdue	L 86–93	13–17 (3–14)	28 – Black	6 – Lucas	6 – Frazier	State Farm Center (14,673); Champaign, IL
Feb 25, 2018; 2:00 pm, BTN		at Rutgers	W 75–62	14–17 (4–14)	19 – Finke	8 – Williams	4 – Frazier	Louis Brown Athletic Center; Piscataway, NJ
Big Ten tournament
Feb 28, 2018; 5:30 pm, BTN	(13)	vs. (12) Iowa; First round	L 87–96	14–18	Nichols – 31	4 – Finke	8 – Lucas	Madison Square Garden; New York City, NY
*Non-conference game. ^{#}Rankings from AP Poll. (#) Tournament seedings in parentheses. All times are in Central Time.

== Awards and honors ==
=== In-season awards ===
==== Trent Frazier ====
- Big Ten Freshman of the Week, December 26, 2017
- Big Ten Freshman of the Week, February 12, 2018

=== Postseason awards ===
==== Trent Frazier ====
- All-Big Ten Honorable Mention (media)
- All-Big Ten Freshmen Team

==== Leron Black ====
- All-Big Ten Honorable Mention (coaches and media)
