= 2020–21 NCAA Division I men's basketball season =

American college basketball season

- Preseason AP No. 1: Gonzaga Bulldogs
- Regular season: November 25, 2020 – March 14, 2021
- NCAA Tournament: 2021
- Tournament dates: March 18 – April 5, 2021
- National Championship: Lucas Oil Stadium; Indianapolis, Indiana
- NCAA Champions: Baylor Bears
- Other champions: Memphis Tigers (NIT), Pepperdine Waves (CBI), Not awarded (CIT)
- Player of the Year (Naismith, Wooden): Luka Garza, Iowa Hawkeyes

The 2020–21 NCAA Division I men's basketball season began on November 25, 2020, and concluded on March 14, 2021. The 2021 NCAA Division I men's basketball tournament culminated the season and began on March 18 and concluded on April 5.

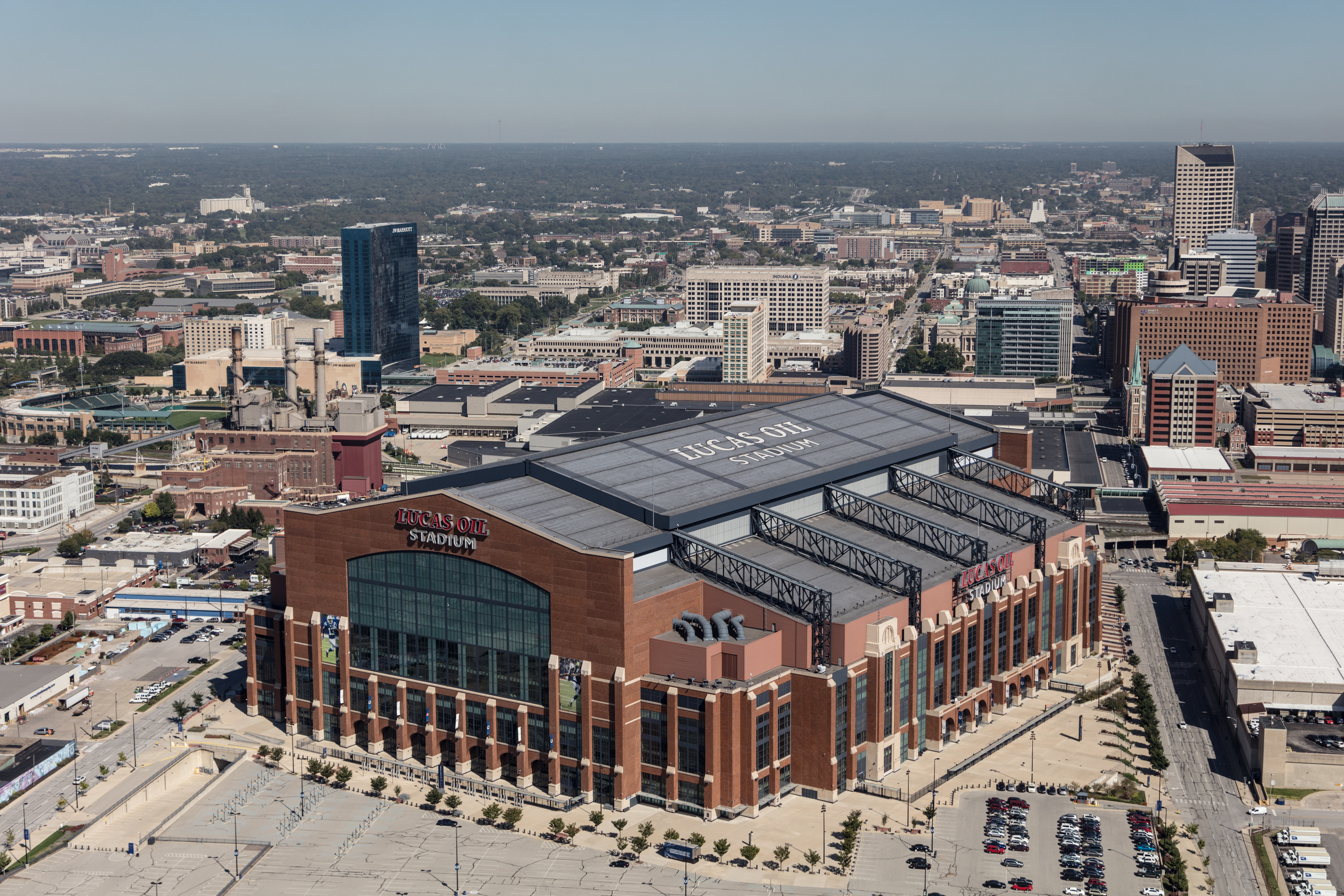
Lucas Oil Stadium in Indianapolis, Indiana, hosted the NCAA men's Final Four.

== Season headlines ==
- November 11 – The Associated Press preseason All-American team was released. Iowa center Luka Garza was the lone unanimous selection (64 votes). Joining him on the team were Baylor guard Jared Butler, Illinois guard Ayo Dosunmu, Oklahoma State guard Cade Cunningham, Gonzaga guard Corey Kispert (26), and Arizona State guard Remy Martin (26).
- November 15 – The UT Martin Skyhawks announced that head coach Anthony Stewart, who had been set to start his fifth season with the Skyhawks, had died earlier that day. No cause of death was given at the time.
- January 18 – When the AP poll's Week 9 top 25 rankings were released, it was the first time since December 18, 1961, that neither Duke, Kentucky, nor North Carolina were included on the list. In 1961, the poll was only composed of the top 10 teams.
- February 7 – The UTRGV Vaqueros announce the death of fifth-year head coach Lew Hill from coronavirus. Longtime assistant Jai Steadman was named interim head coach four days later.
- February 9 – For the first time since an 0–2 start to the 1999–2000 season, the Duke men's basketball team fell below .500 after an 89–93 loss to Notre Dame.
- March 23 – Just three days after playing in the NCAA tournament, Grand Canyon senior Oscar Frayer died in a car crash, along with his sister and one other person.

=== COVID-19 pandemic-related ===
- October 14 – The NCAA announced that all student-athletes in winter sports during the 2020–21 school year, including men's and women's basketball, would receive an extra year of athletic eligibility, whether or not they or their teams play during that school year.
- October 27 – Bethune–Cookman, which had previously canceled its 2020 fall sports due to COVID-19 concerns, announced that none of its other teams, including men's and women's basketball, would play in the 2020–21 school year.
- November 12 – The Ivy League became the first conference to cancel all winter sports for the 2020–21 season, including men's and women's basketball, due to COVID-19 concerns.
- November 19 – Maryland Eastern Shore became the second MEAC program to opt out of the 2020–21 men's and women's basketball seasons due to COVID-19 concerns.
- December 23 – Chicago State ended its 2020–21 season after an 0–9 start marked by many COVID-19-related issues. Head coach Lance Irvin opted out before the season started due to concerns over the disease; the Cougars played one game with only six available players and another with only seven; the team's final game before suspending its season was canceled due to a lack of players.
- February 9 – Howard ended its 2020–21 season after a 1–4 start of an abundance of caution due to the health and safety concerns related to the COVID-19 pandemic.
- February 11 – Organizers of the CollegeInsider.com Postseason Tournament announced that the 2021 edition had been canceled.
- February 13 – Maine decided to conclude their 2020–21 season due to challenges related to COVID-19 after not being cleared to practice or play a game since January 17.
- February 23 – Charleston Southern ended its 2020–21 season after a 3–18 start, citing player concerns over COVID-19.
- February 26 – Jacksonville ended its 2020–21 season after an 11–13 start, citing player concerns over COVID-19.
- March 2 – Holy Cross ended its 2020–21 season after a 5–11 start, citing player concerns over COVID-19.

=== Milestones and records ===
- During the season, the following players reached the 2,000-career-point milestone – Austin Peay swingman Terry Taylor, Pepperdine guard Colbey Ross, Iowa center Luka Garza, Bowling Green guard Justin Turner, Detroit Mercy guard Antoine Davis, UTSA guard Keaton Wallace, and Davidson guard Kellan Grady.
- November 30 – Kansas took sole possession of the record for most consecutive weeks ranked in the AP poll. The Jayhawks' 222nd straight appearance surpassed UCLA's 221 from 1966 to 1980. The Jayhawks' streak ended at 231 when they dropped out of the poll released on February 8.
- December 1 – UC Riverside head coach Mike Magpayo became the first head coach of Asian or Filipino descent to coach and won a Division I game in their 57–42 victory over Washington. Magpayo had missed the Highlanders' season opener on November 25 against Pacific due to his child's birth.
- February 21 – Iowa center Luka Garza scored 23 points in a win against Penn State to become the school's all-time leading scorer, breaking a 32-year-old record previously held by Roy Marble (2,116 points).

== Conference membership changes ==
Ten schools joined a new conference for the 2020–21 season with four schools leaving Division II for Division I.

School	Former conference	New conference
Bellarmine	Great Lakes Valley Conference (D-II)	ASUN Conference
Cal State Bakersfield	Western Athletic Conference	Big West Conference
Dixie State	Rocky Mountain Athletic Conference (D-II)	Western Athletic Conference
Kansas City	Western Athletic Conference	Summit League
NJIT	ASUN Conference	America East Conference
Purdue Fort Wayne	Summit League	Horizon League
Robert Morris	Northeast Conference	Horizon League
Tarleton State	Lone Star Conference (D-II)	Western Athletic Conference
UC San Diego	California Collegiate Athletic Association (D-II)	Big West Conference
UConn	American Athletic Conference	Big East Conference

== Arenas ==
=== New arenas ===
- James Madison opened the new Atlantic Union Bank Center on November 25, 2020, defeating Division II Limestone 89–55.
- Liberty played its first game at Liberty Arena, winning 78–62 over Saint Francis (PA) on December 3, 2020. The first event at the arena, which had officially opened on November 23, was a women's game on December 1.

=== Arenas of new D-I teams ===
Three of the four new D-I members for this season are using existing on-campus facilities:

- Dixie State plays in Burns Arena.
- Tarleton State plays in Wisdom Gym.
- UC San Diego plays in RIMAC Arena.

The other D-I newcomer, Bellarmine, announced a multi-year deal with the Kentucky State Fair Board on November 2, 2020, to play home games at Freedom Hall, located at the Kentucky Exposition Center near Louisville Muhammad Ali International Airport. The arena had been home to Louisville for more than 50 years before that team moved to the downtown KFC Yum! Center in 2010. Due to COVID-19 restrictions, Bellarmine could only seat 300 at its on-campus facility, Knights Hall. With Freedom Hall's basketball capacity of 18,252, the Knights were able to seat 2,700.

=== Arenas closing ===
- High Point had originally planned to open Nido and Mariana Qubein Arena and Conference Center for the 2020–21 season. However, construction delays brought on by COVID-19 led to the university delaying the new arena's opening until 2021–22, meaning that the Millis Center was in use for one more season.
- This was intended to be Idaho's final season at the Kibbie Dome, a facility also home to Idaho football, with its basketball configuration known as Cowan Spectrum. When Idaho moved its 2020 football season to spring 2021, it displaced the men's and women's basketball teams, forcing them to use Memorial Gymnasium. The latter facility had been home to both basketball teams before the Kibbie Dome opened in 1976, and remained a part-time home for both. The school plans to open the new Idaho Central Credit Union Arena for the 2021–22 season. The Dome will remain in use for football and several other sports.

=== Temporary arenas ===
- Due to COVID-19 restrictions in Santa Clara County, Santa Clara and Stanford played the majority of their home games at Kaiser Permanente Arena in neighboring Santa Cruz County.

== Season outlook ==
=== Pre-season polls ===
The top 25 from the AP and USA Today Coaches polls

AP
Ranking	Team
1	Gonzaga (28)
2	Baylor (24)
3	Villanova (1)
4	Virginia (1)
5	Iowa
6	Kansas
7	Wisconsin
8	Illinois
9	Duke
10	Kentucky
11	Creighton
12	Tennessee
13	Michigan State
14	Texas Tech
15	West Virginia
16	North Carolina
17	Houston
18	Arizona State
19	Texas
20	Oregon
21	Florida State
22	UCLA
23	Ohio State
24	Rutgers
25	Michigan

USA Today Coaches
Ranking	Team
1	Baylor (12)
2	Gonzaga (10)
3	Villanova (3)
4	Virginia
5	Kansas
6	Iowa (1)
7	Wisconsin
8	Duke (1)
9	Kentucky
10	Illinois
11	Creighton
12	Michigan State
13	Texas Tech
14	Tennessee
15	West Virginia
16	North Carolina
17	Arizona State
18	Houston т Florida State т
20	Oregon
21	UCLA
22	Texas
23	Rutgers
24	Ohio State
25	Alabama

== Regular season top-10 matchups ==
Rankings reflect the AP poll Top 25.

- November 26
  - No. 1 Gonzaga defeated No. 6 Kansas, 102–90 (Fort Myers Tip-Off, Suncoast Credit Union Arena, Fort Myers, FL)
- December 1
  - No. 8 Michigan State defeated No. 6 Duke, 75–69 (Champions Classic, Cameron Indoor Stadium, Durham, NC)
- December 2
  - No. 2 Baylor defeated No. 5 Illinois, 82–69 (Jimmy V Classic, Bankers Life Fieldhouse, Indianapolis, IN)
- December 8
  - No. 5 Kansas defeated No. 8 Creighton, 73–72 (Big East–Big 12 Battle, Allen Fieldhouse, Lawrence, KS)
  - No. 6 Illinois defeated No. 10 Duke, 83–68 (ACC–Big Ten Challenge, Cameron Indoor Stadium, Durham, NC)
- December 19
  - No. 1 Gonzaga defeated No. 3 Iowa, 99–88 (Sanford Pentagon, Sioux Falls, SD)
- December 22
  - No. 3 Kansas defeated No. 7 West Virginia, 79–65 (Allen Fieldhouse, Lawrence, KS)
- January 2
  - No. 8 Texas defeated No. 3 Kansas, 84–59 (Allen Fieldhouse, Lawrence, KS)
- January 12
  - No. 7 Michigan defeated No. 9 Wisconsin, 77–54 (Crisler Arena, Ann Arbor, MI)
- January 18
  - No. 2 Baylor defeated No. 9 Kansas, 77–69 (Ferrell Center, Waco, TX)
- February 2
  - No. 2 Baylor defeated No. 6 Texas, 83–69 (Frank Erwin Center, Austin, TX)
- February 4
  - No. 7 Ohio State defeated No. 8 Iowa, 89–85 (Carver-Hawkeye Arena, Iowa City, IA)
- February 21
  - No. 3 Michigan defeated No. 4 Ohio State, 92–87 (Value City Arena, Columbus, OH)
- February 25
  - No. 3 Michigan defeated No. 9 Iowa, 79–57 (Crisler Arena, Ann Arbor, MI)
- February 28
  - No. 9 Iowa defeated No. 4 Ohio State, 73–57 (Value City Arena, Columbus, OH)
- March 2
  - No. 3 Baylor defeated No. 6 West Virginia, 94–89 ^{OT} (WVU Coliseum, Morgantown, WV)
  - No. 4 Illinois defeated No. 2 Michigan, 76–53 (Crisler Arena, Ann Arbor, MI)
- March 6
  - No. 4 Illinois defeated No. 7 Ohio State, 73–68 (Value City Arena, Columbus, OH)
- March 13
  - No. 3 Illinois defeated No. 5 Iowa, 82–71 (2021 Big Ten men's basketball tournament, Lucas Oil Stadium, Indianapolis, IN)
  - No. 9 Ohio State defeated No. 4 Michigan, 68–67 (2021 Big Ten men's basketball tournament, Lucas Oil Stadium, Indianapolis)
- March 14
  - No. 3 Illinois defeated No. 9 Ohio State, 91–88 ^{OT} (2021 Big Ten men's basketball tournament, Lucas Oil Stadium, Indianapolis)

== Regular season ==
=== Early season tournaments ===
The Battle 4 Atlantis tournament in Nassau, Bahamas was cancelled due to logistical issues associated with COVID-19. A new tournament known as the Crossover Classic is scheduled to be held at the Sanford Pentagon in Sioux Falls, South Dakota, and had invited almost all of the teams that had originally planned to compete in the Battle 4 Atlantis tournament (although five teams would later drop out).

On October 26, 2020, ESPN Events cancelled 10 early-season tournaments that it organizes. It had planned to hold them at the ESPN Wide World of Sports Complex in Orlando within a protected "bubble" (the same site had recently hosted the remainder of the 2019–20 NBA season under similar circumstances), but The Athletic reported that there had been disagreements over health and COVID-19 testing protocols that had been mandated by ESPN Events (in accordance with recommendations by the CDC), which were stricter than those being adopted by conferences.

=== Upsets ===
Teams listed in bold type won "true road games", defined as games held at an opponent's regular home court (including regularly used alternate homes).

Winner	Score	Loser	Date	Tournament/Event
San Diego State	73–58	No. 22 UCLA	November 25, 2020	San Diego State MTE
San Francisco	61–60	No. 4 Virginia	November 27, 2020	Bubbleville/HomeLight Classic
Virginia Tech	81–73^{OT}	No. 3 Villanova	November 28, 2020	Bubbleville/Hall of Fame Tip Off
**Richmond**	76–64	No. 10 Kentucky	November 29, 2020	Bluegrass Showcase
Missouri	83–75	No. 21 Oregon	December 2, 2020	Game played in Omaha, NE
Marquette	67–65	No. 4 Wisconsin	December 4, 2020	Rivalry
Georgia Tech	79–62	No. 20 Kentucky	December 6, 2020	Holiday Hoopsgiving
**Penn State**	75–55	No. 15 Virginia Tech	December 8, 2020	ACC–Big Ten Challenge
Missouri	81–78	No. 6 Illinois	December 12, 2020	Braggin' Rights
**Marquette**	89–84	No. 9 Creighton	December 14, 2020	
Virginia Tech	66–60	No. 24 Clemson	December 15, 2020	
Purdue	67–60	No. 20 Ohio State	December 16, 2020	
**BYU**	72–62	No. 18 San Diego State	December 18, 2020	
**UCF**	86–74	No. 15 Florida State	December 19, 2020	
Northwestern	79–65	No. 4 Michigan State	December 20, 2020	
NC State	79–76	No. 17 North Carolina	December 22, 2020	Rivalry
Minnesota	102–95^{OT}	No. 4 Iowa	December 25, 2020	
Northwestern	71–70	No. 23 Ohio State	December 26, 2020	
**Maryland**	70–64	No. 6 Wisconsin	December 28, 2020	
Clemson	77–67	No. 18 Florida State	December 29, 2020	
Tulsa	65–64	No. 5 Houston	December 29, 2020	
Oklahoma	75–71	No. 9 West Virginia	January 2, 2021	
**Oklahoma State**	82–77^{OT}	No. 13 Texas Tech	January 2, 2021	
**Alabama**	71–63	No. 7 Tennessee	January 2, 2021	
Mississippi State	78–63	No. 13 Missouri	January 5, 2021	
Louisville	73–71	No. 19 Virginia Tech	January 6, 2021	
Colorado	79–72	No. 17 Oregon	January 7, 2021	
**Purdue**	55–54	No. 23 Michigan State	January 8, 2021	
**Ohio State**	79–68	No. 15 Rutgers	January 9, 2021	
**Maryland**	66–63	No. 12 Illinois	January 10, 2021	
Oklahoma State	75–70	No. 6 Kansas	January 12, 2021	
Butler	70–66^{OT}	No. 8 Creighton	January 16, 2021	
Miami (FL)	78–72	No. 16 Louisville	January 16, 2021	
**St. John's**	74–70	No. 23 UConn	January 18, 2021	
**Purdue**	67–65	No. 15 Ohio State	January 19, 2021	
Florida	75–49	No. 6 Tennessee	January 19, 2021	
Georgia Tech	83–65	No. 20 Clemson	January 20, 2021	
**Providence**	74–70	No. 11 Creighton	January 20, 2021	
**Indiana**	81–69	No. 4 Iowa	January 21, 2021	
Syracuse	78–60	No. 16 Virginia Tech	January 23, 2021	
Oklahoma	75–68	No. 9 Kansas	January 23, 2021	
**Maryland**	63–49	No. 17 Minnesota	January 23, 2021	
Florida State	80–61	No. 20 Clemson	January 23, 2021	
Stanford	73–72^{OT}	No. 24 UCLA	January 23, 2021	
**Oregon State**	75–64	No. 21 Oregon	January 23, 2021	Rivalry
**Dayton**	76–71	No. 22 Saint Louis	January 26, 2021	
Auburn	88–82	No. 12 Missouri	January 26, 2021	
Clemson	54–50	No. 25 Louisville	January 27, 2021	
**Florida**	85–80	No. 11 West Virginia	January 30, 2021	SEC/Big 12 Challenge
Penn State	81–71	No. 14 Wisconsin	January 30, 2021	
Georgia Tech	76–65	No. 16 Florida State	January 30, 2021	
Purdue	81–62	No. 21 Minnesota	January 30, 2021	
Maryland	61–60	No. 24 Purdue	February 2, 2021	
Ole Miss	52–50	No. 11 Tennessee	February 2, 2021	
East Carolina	82–73	No. 5 Houston	February 3, 2021	
**South Carolina**	72–66	No. 22 Florida	February 3, 2021	
Pittsburgh	83–72	No. 16 Virginia Tech	February 3, 2021	
St. John's	70–59	No. 3 Villanova	February 3, 2021	
**Georgetown**	86–79	No. 15 Creighton	February 3, 2021	
Oklahoma State	75–67^{2OT}	No. 6 Texas	February 6, 2021	
USC	66–48	No. 21 UCLA	February 6, 2021	Rivalry
Indiana	67–65	No. 8 Iowa	February 7, 2021	
Valparaiso	74–57	No. 25 Drake	February 7, 2021	
Kansas	78–66	No. 23 Oklahoma State	February 8, 2021	
Ole Miss	80–59	No. 10 Missouri	February 10, 2021	
Minnesota	71–68	No. 24 Purdue	February 11, 2021	
LSU	78–65	No. 16 Tennessee	February 13, 2021	
**Arkansas**	86–81^{OT}	No. 10 Missouri	February 13, 2021	
Drake	51–50^{OT}	No. 22 Loyola–Chicago	February 14, 2021	
Georgia	80–70	No. 20 Missouri	February 16, 2021	
Wichita State	68–63	No. 6 Houston	February 18, 2021	
**Kentucky**	70–55	No. 19 Tennessee	February 20, 2021	Rivalry
**Arizona**	81–72	No. 17 USC	February 20, 2021	
Duke	66–65	No. 7 Virginia	February 20, 2021	
Oklahoma State	74–69^{OT}	No. 18 Texas Tech	February 22, 2021	
**Georgia Tech**	69–53	No. 16 Virginia Tech	February 23, 2021	
Michigan State	81–72	No. 5 Illinois	February 23, 2021	
**Ole Miss**	60–53	No. 24 Missouri	February 23, 2021	
Kansas State	62–57	No. 7 Oklahoma	February 23, 2021	
**NC State**	68–61	No. 15 Virginia	February 24, 2021	
Colorado	80–62	No. 19 USC	February 25, 2021	
Michigan State	71–67	No. 4 Ohio State	February 25, 2021	
Auburn	77–72	No. 25 Tennessee	February 27, 2021	
**Oklahoma State**	94–90^{OT}	No. 7 Oklahoma	February 27, 2021	Bedlam Series
North Carolina	78–70	No. 11 Florida State	February 27, 2021	
Xavier	77–69	No. 13 Creighton	February 27, 2021	
Utah	71–61	No. 19 USC	February 27, 2021	
Butler	73–61	No. 8 Villanova	February 28, 2021	
Notre Dame	83–73	No. 11 Florida State	March 6, 2021	
Providence	54–52	No. 10 Villanova	March 6, 2021	
Michigan State	70–64	No. 2 Michigan	March 7, 2021	Rivalry
Georgetown	72–71	No. 14 Villanova	March 11, 2021	Big East tournament
North Carolina	81–73	No. 22 Virginia Tech	March 11, 2021	ACC tournament
LSU	78–71	No. 8 Arkansas	March 13, 2021	SEC tournament
Georgetown	73–48	No. 17 Creighton	March 13, 2021	Big East tournament
Georgia Tech	80–75	No. 15 Florida State	March 13, 2021	ACC tournament
Oregon State	80–78	No. 23 Colorado	March 13, 2021	Pac-12 tournament

In addition to the above listed upsets in which an unranked team defeated a ranked team, there were eleven non-Division I teams to defeat a Division I team this season. Bold type indicates winning teams in "true road games"—i.e., those played on an opponent's home court (including secondary homes).

Winner	Score	Loser	Date	Tournament/event
**Southern Wesleyan** (Division II)	82–72	USC Upstate	November 25, 2020	
Queens (NC) (Division II)	85–71	Howard	November 27, 2020	Paradise Jam
**Emmanuel (GA)** (Division II)	64–61	Stetson	November 30, 2020	
Flagler (Division II)	92–73	Central Michigan	December 2, 2020	
**Greensboro** (Division III)	67–64	Longwood	December 6, 2020	
**Fort Hays State** (Division II)	81–68	Kansas State	December 8, 2020	
**Our Lady of the Lake** (NAIA)	61–58	Texas State	December 12, 2020	
**West Virginia Tech** (NAIA)	73–67	Morgan State	December 19, 2020	
**Flagler** (Division II)	73–66	North Florida	December 19, 2020	
**Northwest Nazarene** (Division II)	75–72	Portland State	January 9, 2021	
**Belmont Abbey** (Division II)	75–72^{OT}	Charlotte	January 9, 2021	

=== Conference winners and tournaments ===
Each of the 31 Division I athletic conferences that played in 2020–21 ended its regular season with a single-elimination tournament. The team with the best regular-season record in each conference was given the number one seed in each tournament, with tiebreakers used as needed in the case of ties for the top seeding. The winners of these tournaments received automatic invitations to the 2021 NCAA Division I men's basketball tournament.

Conference	Regular season first place	Conference player of the year	Conference coach of the Year	Conference tournament	Tournament venue (city)	Tournament winner
America East Conference	UMBC (Note: Top seed in conference tournament) & Vermont	Ryan Davis, Vermont	Ryan Odom, UMBC	2021 America East men's basketball tournament	Campus sites	Hartford
American Athletic Conference	Wichita State	Quentin Grimes, Houston & Tyson Etienne, Wichita State	Isaac Brown, Wichita State	2021 American Athletic Conference men's basketball tournament	Dickies Arena (Fort Worth, TX)	Houston
ASUN Conference	Liberty	Darius McGhee, Liberty	Ritchie McKay, Liberty	2021 ASUN men's basketball tournament	Swisher Gymnasium & UNF Arena (Jacksonville, FL)	Liberty
Atlantic 10 Conference	St. Bonaventure	Nah'Shon Hyland, VCU	Mark Schmidt, St. Bonaventure	2021 Atlantic 10 men's basketball tournament	Early rounds: Robins Center & Siegel Center (Richmond, VA); Final: UD Arena (Dayton, OH)	St. Bonaventure
Atlantic Coast Conference	Virginia	Moses Wright, Georgia Tech	Mike Young, Virginia Tech	2021 ACC men's basketball tournament	Greensboro Coliseum (Greensboro, NC)	Georgia Tech
Big 12 Conference	Baylor	Cade Cunningham, Oklahoma State	Scott Drew, Baylor	2021 Big 12 men's basketball tournament	T-Mobile Center (Kansas City, MO)	Texas
Big East Conference	Villanova	Collin Gillespie, Villanova, Sandro Mamukelashvili, Seton Hall & Jeremiah Robinson-Earl, Villanova	Mike Anderson, St. John's	2021 Big East men's basketball tournament	Madison Square Garden (Manhattan, NY)	Georgetown
Big Sky Conference	Southern Utah	Tanner Groves, Eastern Washington	Todd Simon, Southern Utah	2021 Big Sky Conference men's basketball tournament	Idaho Central Arena (Boise, ID)	Eastern Washington
Big South Conference	Winthrop	Chandler Vaudrin, Winthrop	Pat Kelsey, Winthrop	2021 Big South Conference men's basketball tournament	Campus sites	Winthrop
Big Ten Conference	Michigan	Luka Garza, Iowa	Juwan Howard, Michigan	2021 Big Ten men's basketball tournament	Lucas Oil Stadium (Indianapolis, IN)	Illinois
Big West Conference	UC Santa Barbara	JaQuori McLaughlin, UC Santa Barbara	Joe Pasternack, UC Santa Barbara	2021 Big West Conference men's basketball tournament	Michelob Ultra Arena (Paradise, NV)	UC Santa Barbara
Colonial Athletic Association	James Madison & Northeastern	Matt Lewis, James Madison	Mark Byington, James Madison	2021 CAA men's basketball tournament	Atlantic Union Bank Center (Harrisonburg, VA)	Drexel
Conference USA	Western Kentucky (East) and Louisiana Tech (West) (Note: These conferences chose to seed their tournament by division, with both divisional champions being top seeds in different halves of the bracket.)	Charles Bassey, Western Kentucky	Eric Konkol, Louisiana Tech	2021 Conference USA men's basketball tournament	Ford Center (Frisco, TX)	North Texas
Horizon League	Cleveland State & Wright State	Loudon Love, Wright State	Dennis Gates, Cleveland State	2021 Horizon League men's basketball tournament	First round and quarterfinals: Campus sites Semifinals and final: Indiana Farmers Coliseum (Indianapolis, IN)	Cleveland State
Ivy League	No Ivy League season held due to COVID-19 concerns.					
Metro Atlantic Athletic Conference	Siena & Monmouth	Manny Camper, Siena	King Rice, Monmouth	2021 MAAC men's basketball tournament	Boardwalk Hall (Atlantic City, NJ)	Iona
Mid-American Conference	Toledo	Marreon Jackson, Toledo	Tod Kowalczyk, Toledo	2021 Mid-American Conference men's basketball tournament	Rocket Mortgage FieldHouse (Cleveland, OH)	Ohio
Mid-Eastern Athletic Conference	Norfolk State & Coppin State (North); North Carolina A&T (South)	Anthony Tarke, Coppin State	Robert McCullum, Florida A&M	2021 MEAC men's basketball tournament	Norfolk Scope (Norfolk, VA)	Norfolk State
Missouri Valley Conference	Loyola	Cameron Krutwig, Loyola	Darian DeVries, Drake	2021 Missouri Valley Conference men's basketball tournament	Enterprise Center (St. Louis, MO)	Loyola
Mountain West Conference	San Diego State	Matt Mitchell, San Diego State	Brian Dutcher, San Diego State	2021 Mountain West Conference men's basketball tournament	Thomas & Mack Center (Paradise, NV)	San Diego State
Northeast Conference	Wagner	Alex Morales, Wagner	Bashir Mason, Wagner	2021 Northeast Conference men's basketball tournament	Campus sites	Mount St. Mary's
Ohio Valley Conference	Belmont	Terry Taylor, Austin Peay	Preston Spradlin, Morehead State	2021 Ohio Valley Conference men's basketball tournament	Ford Center (Evansville, IN)	Morehead State
Pac-12 Conference	Oregon	Evan Mobley, USC	Andy Enfield, USC	2021 Pac-12 Conference men's basketball tournament	T-Mobile Arena (Paradise, NV)	Oregon State
Patriot League	Navy	Jordan Burns, Colgate	Ed DeChellis, Navy	2021 Patriot League men's basketball tournament	Campus sites	Colgate
Southeastern Conference	Alabama	Herbert Jones, Alabama	Nate Oats, Alabama	2021 SEC men's basketball tournament	Bridgestone Arena (Nashville, TN)	Alabama
Southern Conference	UNC Greensboro	Isaiah Miller, UNC Greensboro	Dan Earl, VMI	2021 Southern Conference men's basketball tournament	Harrah's Cherokee Center (Asheville, NC)	UNC Greensboro
Southland Conference	Nicholls	Zach Nutall, Sam Houston State	Austin Claunch, Nicholls	2021 Southland Conference men's basketball tournament	Leonard E. Merrell Center (Katy, TX)	Abilene Christian
Southwestern Athletic Conference	Prairie View A&M	Tristan Jarrett, Jackson State	Byron Smith, Prairie View A&M	2021 SWAC men's basketball tournament	Bartow Arena (Birmingham, AL)	Texas Southern
Summit League	South Dakota State	Max Abmas, Oral Roberts	Todd Lee, South Dakota	2021 Summit League men's basketball tournament	Sanford Pentagon (Sioux Falls, SD)	Oral Roberts
Sun Belt Conference	Georgia State (East) and Texas State (West)	DeVante' Jones, Coastal Carolina	Terrence Johnson, Texas State	2021 Sun Belt Conference men's basketball tournament	Hartsell Arena & Pensacola Bay Center (Pensacola, FL)	Appalachian State
West Coast Conference	Gonzaga	Corey Kispert, Gonzaga	Mark Few, Gonzaga	2021 West Coast Conference men's basketball tournament	Orleans Arena (Paradise, NV)	Gonzaga
Western Athletic Conference	Grand Canyon	Fardaws Aimaq, Utah Valley	Lew Hill, Texas–Rio Grande Valley	2021 WAC men's basketball tournament	Orleans Arena (Paradise, NV)	Grand Canyon

=== Statistical leaders ===
Source for additional stats categories

**Points per game**			**Rebounds per game**			**Assists per game**			**Steals per game**		
Player	School	PPG	Player	School	RPG	Player	School	APG	Player	School	SPG
Max Abmas	Oral Roberts	24.5	Fardaws Aimaq	Utah Valley	15.0	Jalen Moore	Oakland	8.4	Jacob Gilyard	Richmond	3.57
Luka Garza	Iowa	24.1	Jayveous McKinnis	Jackson St.	13.2	Colbey Ross	Pepperdine	7.7	Jose Alvarado	Georgia Tech	2.85
Antoine Davis	Detroit Mercy	24.0	Norchad Omier	Arkansas St.	12.3	Cam Mack	Prairie View A&M	7.7	DeVante' Jones	Coastal Carolina	2.81
Cameron Thomas	LSU	23.0	Elyjah Goss	IUPUI	11.6	Kendric Davis	SMU	7.6	Kameron Langley	NC A&T	2.68
Loren Cristian Jackson	Akron	22.3	Charles Bassey	W. Kentucky	11.6	Sahvir Wheeler	Georgia	7.4	Cam Mack	Prairie View A&M	2.67

**Blocked shots per game**			**Field goal percentage**			**Three-point field goal percentage**			**Free throw percentage**		
Player	School	BPG	Player	School	FG%	Player	School	3FG%	Player	School	FT%
KC Ndefo	St. Peter's	3.64	Asbjorn Midtgaard	Grand Canyon	.707	Chris Shelton	Hampton	.486	Ty Gadsden	UNC Wilmington	.944
Dajour Dickens	Hampton	3.38	Dwight Wilson	Ohio	.655	Spencer Littleson	Toledo	.473	C. J. Walker	Ohio St.	.941
Neemias Queta	Utah St.	3.34	Drew Timme	Gonzaga	.655	Jordan Schakel	San Diego St.	.461	Robby Beasley	Montana	.929
Charles Bassey	W. Kentucky	3.11	Kofi Cockburn	Illinois	.654	Nate Johnson	Xavier	.452	Antoine Davis	Detroit Mercy	.917
Mouhamadou Gueye	Stony Brook	3.10	Xavier Cork	W. Carolina	.641	Jon Williams	Robert Morris	.445	Justin Jaworski	Lafayette	.913

== Postseason ==
=== NCAA tournament ===
==== Tournament upsets ====
For this list, an "upset" is defined as a win by a team seeded 7 or more spots below its defeated opponent. This is more restrictive than the NCAA's official definition, in which a difference of 5 seed lines is sufficient to declare an "upset".

Date	Winner	Score	Loser	Region	Round
March 19	Oregon State (#12)	70–56	Tennessee (#5)	Midwest	First round
March 19	North Texas (#13)	78–69^{OT}	Purdue (#4)	South	First round
March 19	Oral Roberts (#15)	75–72^{OT}	Ohio State (#2)	South	First round
March 20	Ohio (#13)	62–58	Virginia (#4)	West	First round
March 20	Abilene Christian (#14)	53–52	Texas (#3)	East	First round
March 21	Loyola–Chicago (#8)	71–58	Illinois (#1)	Midwest	Second round
March 21	Syracuse (#11)	75–72	West Virginia (#3)	Midwest	Second round
March 21	Oregon State (#12)	80–70	Oklahoma State (#4)	Midwest	Second round
March 21	Oral Roberts (#15)	81–78	Florida (#7)	South	Second round
March 28	UCLA (#11)	88–78^{OT}	Alabama (#2)	East	Sweet Sixteen
March 30	UCLA (#11)	51–49	Michigan (#1)	East	Elite Eight

=== Teams eliminated from postseason participation due to COVID-19 ===
- March 5 – Northern Iowa
- March 9 – FIU
- March 11 – Duke
- March 12 – North Carolina A&T

== Conference standings ==
2020–21 America East Conference men's basketball standings
	Conf.				Overall
Team	W		L	PCT	W		L	PCT
UMBC	10	–	4	.714	14	–	6	.700
Vermont	10	–	4	.714	10	–	5	.667
New Hampshire	9	–	6	.600	10	–	9	.526
Hartford †	8	–	6	.571	15	–	9	.625
Albany	6	–	6	.500	7	–	9	.438
UMass Lowell	7	–	8	.467	11	–	12	.478
Stony Brook	7	–	9	.438	9	–	14	.391
NJIT	6	–	10	.375	7	–	12	.368
Binghamton	4	–	10	.286	4	–	14	.222
Maine	2	–	6	.250	2	–	7	.222
† 2021 AmEast tournament winner Maine suspended its season on February 13, 2021.

2020–21 American Athletic Conference men's basketball standings
	Conf.				Overall
Team	W		L	PCT	W		L	PCT
Wichita State	11	–	2	.846	16	–	6	.727
No. 6 Houston †	14	–	3	.824	28	–	4	.875
Memphis	11	–	4	.733	20	–	8	.714
SMU	7	–	4	.636	11	–	6	.647
Cincinnati	8	–	6	.571	12	–	11	.522
UCF	8	–	10	.444	11	–	12	.478
Tulsa	7	–	9	.438	11	–	12	.478
South Florida	4	–	10	.286	9	–	13	.409
Temple	4	–	10	.286	5	–	11	.313
Tulane	4	–	12	.250	10	–	13	.435
East Carolina	2	–	10	.167	8	–	11	.421
† 2021 AAC tournament winner Rankings from AP poll

2020–21 Atlantic 10 men's basketball standings
	Conf.				Overall
Team	W		L	PCT	W		L	PCT
St. Bonaventure†	11	–	4	.733	16	–	5	.762
VCU	10	–	4	.714	19	–	7	.731
Davidson	7	–	4	.636	13	–	9	.591
Saint Louis	6	–	4	.600	14	–	7	.667
UMass	6	–	4	.600	8	–	7	.533
George Mason	8	–	6	.571	13	–	9	.591
Dayton	9	–	7	.563	14	–	10	.583
Richmond	6	–	5	.545	14	–	9	.609
Duquesne	7	–	7	.500	9	–	9	.500
Rhode Island	7	–	10	.412	10	–	15	.400
George Washington	3	–	5	.375	5	–	12	.294
La Salle	6	–	11	.353	9	–	16	.360
Saint Joseph's	3	–	9	.250	5	–	15	.250
Fordham	2	–	11	.154	2	–	12	.143
† 2021 A10 Tournament winner

2020–21 ACC men's basketball standings
	Conf.				Overall
Team	W		L	PCT	W		L	PCT
No. 15 Virginia	13	–	4	.765	18	–	7	.720
No. 14 Florida State	11	–	4	.733	18	–	7	.720
No. 25 Virginia Tech	9	–	4	.692	15	–	7	.682
Georgia Tech †	11	–	6	.647	17	–	9	.654
Clemson	10	–	6	.625	16	–	8	.667
North Carolina	10	–	6	.625	18	–	11	.621
Louisville	8	–	5	.615	13	–	7	.650
Syracuse	9	–	7	.563	18	–	10	.643
NC State	9	–	8	.529	14	–	11	.560
Duke	9	–	9	.500	13	–	11	.542
Notre Dame	7	–	11	.389	11	–	15	.423
Pittsburgh	6	–	10	.375	10	–	12	.455
Miami (FL)	4	–	15	.211	10	–	17	.370
Wake Forest	3	–	15	.167	6	–	16	.273
Boston College	2	–	11	.154	4	–	16	.200
† 2021 ACC tournament winner Rankings from AP poll

2020–21 ASUN men's basketball standings
	Conf.				Overall
Team	W		L	PCT	W		L	PCT
Liberty †	11	–	2	.846	23	–	6	.793
Bellarmine *	10	–	3	.769	14	–	8	.636
Lipscomb	9	–	6	.600	15	–	12	.556
North Florida	6	–	6	.500	8	–	15	.348
North Alabama *	7	–	8	.467	13	–	11	.542
Florida Gulf Coast	4	–	5	.444	10	–	8	.556
Stetson	7	–	9	.438	12	–	15	.444
Jacksonville	5	–	9	.357	11	–	13	.458
Kennesaw State	2	–	13	.133	5	–	19	.208
† 2021 ASUN Tournament winner * ineligible for the 2021 NCAA tournament due to transition period Jacksonville suspended their season on February 26, 2021

2020–21 Big East men's basketball standings
	Conf.				Overall
Team	W		L	PCT	W		L	PCT
No. 18 Villanova	11	–	4	.733	18	–	7	.720
No. 19 Creighton	14	–	6	.700	22	–	9	.710
UConn	11	–	6	.647	15	–	8	.652
St. John's	10	–	9	.526	16	–	11	.593
Seton Hall	10	–	9	.526	14	–	13	.519
Providence	9	–	10	.474	13	–	13	.500
Xavier	6	–	7	.462	13	–	8	.619
Georgetown †	7	–	9	.438	13	–	13	.500
Marquette	8	–	11	.421	13	–	14	.481
Butler	8	–	12	.400	10	–	15	.400
DePaul	2	–	13	.133	5	–	14	.263
† 2021 Big East tournament winner Rankings from AP poll

2020–21 Big Sky men's basketball standings
	Conf.				Overall
Team	W		L	PCT	W		L	PCT
Southern Utah	12	–	2	.857	20	–	4	.833
Weber State	12	–	3	.800	17	–	6	.739
Eastern Washington†	12	–	3	.800	16	–	8	.667
Montana State	8	–	6	.571	13	–	10	.565
Idaho State	8	–	6	.571	13	–	11	.542
Montana	7	–	9	.438	15	–	13	.536
Northern Colorado	6	–	8	.429	11	–	11	.500
Portland State	6	–	8	.429	9	–	13	.409
Sacramento State	5	–	9	.357	8	–	12	.400
Northern Arizona	4	–	10	.286	6	–	16	.273
Idaho	1	–	17	.056	1	–	21	.045
† Conference tournament winner

2020–21 Big South men's basketball standings
	Conf.				Overall
Team	W		L	PCT	W		L	PCT
Winthrop †	17	–	1	.944	23	–	2	.920
Radford	12	–	6	.667	15	–	12	.556
Campbell	11	–	6	.647	17	–	10	.630
UNC Asheville	9	–	5	.643	10	–	10	.500
Longwood	10	–	10	.500	12	–	17	.414
Gardner–Webb	10	–	10	.500	11	–	15	.423
Hampton	9	–	9	.500	11	–	14	.440
High Point	6	–	11	.353	9	–	15	.375
USC Upstate	5	–	11	.313	5	–	18	.217
Presbyterian	5	–	12	.294	7	–	15	.318
Charleston Southern	2	–	15	.118	3	–	18	.143
† 2021 Big South tournament winner Charleston Southern suspended their season on February 23, 2021.

2020–21 Big Ten Conference men's basketball standings
	Conf.				Overall
Team	W		L	PCT	W		L	PCT
No. 4 Michigan	14	–	3	.824	23	–	5	.821
No. 2 Illinois †	16	–	4	.800	24	–	7	.774
No. 8 Iowa	14	–	6	.700	22	–	9	.710
No. 20 Purdue	13	–	6	.684	18	–	10	.643
No. 7 Ohio State	12	–	8	.600	21	–	10	.677
Wisconsin	10	–	10	.500	18	–	13	.581
Rutgers	10	–	10	.500	16	–	12	.571
Maryland	9	–	11	.450	17	–	14	.548
Michigan State	9	–	11	.450	15	–	13	.536
Indiana	7	–	12	.368	12	–	15	.444
Penn State	7	–	12	.368	11	–	14	.440
Northwestern	6	–	13	.316	9	–	15	.375
Minnesota	6	–	14	.300	14	–	15	.483
Nebraska	3	–	16	.158	7	–	20	.259
† Conference tournament winner Rankings from AP poll

2020–21 Big 12 men's basketball standings
	Conf.				Overall
Team	W		L	PCT	W		L	PCT
No. 1 Baylor	13	–	1	.929	28	–	2	.933
No. 16 Kansas	12	–	6	.667	21	–	9	.700
No. 21 Texas †	11	–	6	.647	19	–	8	.704
No. 18 West Virginia	11	–	6	.647	19	–	10	.655
No. 19 Oklahoma State	11	–	7	.611	21	–	9	.700
No. 22 Texas Tech	9	–	8	.529	18	–	11	.621
Oklahoma	9	–	8	.529	16	–	11	.593
TCU	5	–	11	.313	12	–	14	.462
Kansas State	4	–	14	.222	9	–	20	.310
Iowa State	0	–	18	.000	2	–	22	.083
† 2021 Big 12 Tournament winner Rankings from AP poll

2020–21 Big West men's basketball standings
	Conf.				Overall
Team	W		L	PCT	W		L	PCT
UC Santa Barbara †	13	–	3	.813	22	–	5	.815
UC Irvine	10	–	4	.714	18	–	9	.667
UC Riverside	8	–	4	.667	14	–	8	.636
UC Davis	6	–	4	.600	10	–	8	.556
Cal State Bakersfield	9	–	7	.563	15	–	11	.577
Hawai'i	9	–	9	.500	11	–	10	.524
Cal State Fullerton	5	–	7	.417	6	–	10	.375
Cal State Northridge	5	–	9	.357	9	–	13	.409
Long Beach State	4	–	8	.333	6	–	12	.333
Cal Poly	1	–	15	.063	4	–	20	.167
UC San Diego*	0	–	0	–	7	–	10	.412
† 2021 Big West tournament winner * ineligible for the 2021 NCAA tournament and 2021 Big West tournament due to transition period; Big West games not counted in standings

2020–21 CAA men's basketball standings
	Conf.				Overall
Team	W		L	PCT	W		L	PCT
James Madison	8	–	2	.800	13	–	7	.650
Northeastern	8	–	2	.800	10	–	9	.526
Charleston	6	–	4	.600	9	–	10	.474
Hofstra	8	–	6	.571	13	–	10	.565
Delaware	5	–	4	.556	7	–	8	.467
Drexel †	4	–	5	.444	12	–	8	.600
William & Mary	4	–	6	.400	7	–	10	.412
Elon	4	–	7	.364	10	–	9	.526
Towson	3	–	9	.250	4	–	14	.222
UNC Wilmington	1	–	6	.143	7	–	10	.412
† 2021 CAA tournament winner

2020–21 Conference USA men's basketball standings
	Conf.				Overall
Team	W		L	PCT	W		L	PCT
East
Western Kentucky	11	–	3	.786	21	–	8	.724
Old Dominion	11	–	5	.688	15	–	8	.652
Marshall	9	–	5	.643	15	–	7	.682
Florida Atlantic	7	–	5	.583	13	–	10	.565
Charlotte	5	–	11	.313	9	–	15	.375
Middle Tennessee	3	–	13	.188	5	–	18	.217
FIU	2	–	15	.118	9	–	17	.346
West
Louisiana Tech	12	–	4	.750	24	–	8	.750
UAB	13	–	5	.722	22	–	7	.759
North Texas †	9	–	5	.643	18	–	10	.643
UTSA	9	–	7	.563	15	–	11	.577
UTEP	8	–	8	.500	12	–	12	.500
Rice	6	–	10	.375	15	–	13	.536
Southern Miss	4	–	13	.235	8	–	17	.320
† 2021 C-USA Tournament winner

2020–21 Horizon League men's basketball standings
	Conf.				Overall
Team	W		L	PCT	W		L	PCT
Wright State	16	–	4	.800	18	–	6	.750
Cleveland State †	16	–	4	.800	19	–	8	.704
Detroit Mercy	10	–	6	.625	12	–	10	.545
Northern Kentucky	11	–	7	.611	14	–	11	.560
Oakland	10	–	10	.500	12	–	18	.400
Youngstown State	9	–	11	.450	15	–	12	.556
IUPUI	7	–	9	.438	8	–	10	.444
Milwaukee	7	–	10	.412	10	–	12	.455
Green Bay	8	–	12	.400	8	–	17	.320
UIC	6	–	10	.375	9	–	13	.409
Purdue Fort Wayne	6	–	14	.300	8	–	15	.348
Robert Morris	3	–	12	.200	4	–	15	.211
† 2021 Horizon League tournament winner

2020–21 MAAC men's basketball standings
	Conf.				Overall
Team	W		L	PCT	W		L	PCT
Siena	12	–	4	.750	12	–	5	.706
Monmouth	12	–	6	.667	12	–	8	.600
Saint Peter's	10	–	8	.556	14	–	11	.560
Marist	10	–	8	.556	12	–	9	.571
Niagara	7	–	9	.438	9	–	11	.450
Canisius	7	–	5	.583	7	–	6	.538
Fairfield	7	–	11	.389	10	–	17	.370
Quinnipiac	7	–	10	.412	9	–	13	.409
Iona †	6	–	3	.667	12	–	6	.667
Manhattan	6	–	12	.333	7	–	13	.350
Rider	5	–	13	.278	6	–	17	.261
† 2021 MAAC tournament winner Note: The MAAC has ordered standings based on league wins, not winning percentage, since all teams did not reach 20 conference games played. These standings were also used for seeding purposes in the 2021 MAAC tournament.

2020–21 Mid-American Conference men's basketball standings
	Conf.				Overall
Team	W		L	PCT	W		L	PCT
Toledo	15	–	4	.789	21	–	9	.700
Buffalo	12	–	5	.706	16	–	9	.640
Akron	12	–	6	.667	15	–	8	.652
Kent State	12	–	6	.667	15	–	8	.652
Ohio †	9	–	5	.643	17	–	8	.680
Bowling Green	10	–	8	.556	14	–	12	.538
Miami (OH)	9	–	8	.529	12	–	11	.522
Ball State	8	–	9	.471	10	–	13	.435
Western Michigan	4	–	12	.250	5	–	16	.238
Eastern Michigan	3	–	11	.214	6	–	12	.333
Central Michigan	3	–	13	.188	7	–	16	.304
Northern Illinois	2	–	12	.143	3	–	16	.158
† 2021 MAC tournament winner

2020–21 MEAC men's basketball standings
	Conf.				Overall
Team	W		L	PCT	W		L	PCT
Northern
Norfolk State †	8	–	4	.667	17	–	8	.680
Coppin State	8	–	4	.667	9	–	13	.409
Morgan State	7	–	5	.583	14	–	8	.636
Delaware State	1	–	11	.083	3	–	16	.158
Howard	0	–	0	–	1	–	4	.200
Southern
North Carolina A&T	7	–	1	.875	11	–	10	.524
Florida A&M	7	–	5	.583	8	–	12	.400
North Carolina Central	3	–	5	.375	5	–	9	.357
South Carolina State	1	–	7	.125	1	–	17	.056
† 2021 MEAC tournament winner Howard suspended their season on February 9, 2021; Bethune–Cookman and Maryland Eastern Shore did not play the 2020–21 season due to COVID-19 concerns.

2020–21 Missouri Valley Conference men's basketball standings
	Conf.				Overall
Team	W		L	PCT	W		L	PCT
No. 17 Loyola Chicago †	16	–	2	.889	26	–	5	.839
Drake	15	–	3	.833	26	–	5	.839
Missouri State	12	–	6	.667	17	–	7	.708
Indiana State	11	–	7	.611	15	–	10	.600
Evansville	7	–	11	.389	9	–	16	.360
Valparaiso	7	–	11	.389	10	–	18	.357
Northern Iowa	7	–	11	.389	10	–	15	.400
Bradley	6	–	12	.333	12	–	16	.429
Southern Illinois	5	–	13	.278	12	–	14	.462
Illinois State	4	–	14	.222	7	–	18	.280
† 2021 MVC tournament winner Rankings from AP poll

2020–21 Mountain West Conference men's basketball standings
	Conf.				Overall
Team	W		L	PCT	W		L	PCT
No. 16 San Diego State†	14	–	3	.824	23	–	5	.821
Utah State	15	–	4	.789	20	–	9	.690
Colorado State	14	–	4	.778	20	–	8	.714
Boise State	14	–	6	.700	19	–	9	.679
Nevada	10	–	7	.588	16	–	10	.615
Fresno State	9	–	11	.450	12	–	12	.500
UNLV	8	–	10	.444	12	–	15	.444
Wyoming	7	–	9	.438	14	–	11	.560
San Jose State	3	–	13	.188	5	–	16	.238
Air Force	3	–	17	.150	5	–	20	.200
New Mexico	2	–	15	.118	6	–	16	.273
† Conference tournament winner Rankings from AP poll

2020–21 Northeast Conference men's basketball standings
	Conf.				Overall
Team	W		L	PCT	W		L	PCT
Wagner	13	–	5	.722	13	–	7	.650
Bryant	10	–	4	.714	15	–	7	.682
Sacred Heart	9	–	7	.563	9	–	9	.500
Mount St. Mary's †	9	–	7	.563	12	–	11	.522
Merrimack*	9	–	9	.500	9	–	9	.500
LIU	9	–	9	.500	9	–	9	.500
St. Francis Brooklyn	9	–	9	.500	9	–	10	.474
Fairleigh Dickinson	8	–	10	.444	9	–	15	.375
Saint Francis (PA)	5	–	13	.278	6	–	16	.273
Central Connecticut	5	–	13	.278	5	–	16	.238
† 2021 NEC tournament winner * ineligible for the 2021 NCAA tournament due to transition period

2020–21 Ohio Valley Conference men's basketball standings
	Conf.				Overall
Team	W		L	PCT	W		L	PCT
Belmont	18	–	2	.900	26	–	4	.867
Morehead State †	17	–	3	.850	23	–	8	.742
Eastern Kentucky	15	–	5	.750	22	–	7	.759
Jacksonville State	13	–	6	.684	18	–	9	.667
Austin Peay	10	–	10	.500	14	–	13	.519
Murray State	10	–	10	.500	13	–	13	.500
Southeast Missouri State	9	–	11	.450	11	–	16	.407
SIU Edwardsville	7	–	12	.368	9	–	17	.346
Eastern Illinois	6	–	14	.300	9	–	18	.333
UT Martin	6	–	14	.300	8	–	16	.333
Tennessee Tech	5	–	15	.250	5	–	22	.185
Tennessee State	3	–	17	.150	4	–	19	.174
† 2021 OVC tournament winner

2020–21 Pac-12 Conference men's basketball standings
	Conf.				Overall
Team	W		L	PCT	W		L	PCT
Oregon	14	–	4	.778	21	–	7	.750
No. 23 USC	15	–	5	.750	25	–	8	.758
No. 22 Colorado	14	–	6	.700	23	–	9	.719
UCLA	13	–	6	.684	22	–	10	.688
Arizona*	11	–	9	.550	17	–	9	.654
Oregon State †	10	–	10	.500	20	–	13	.606
Stanford	10	–	10	.500	14	–	13	.519
Utah	8	–	11	.421	12	–	13	.480
Arizona State	7	–	10	.412	11	–	14	.440
Washington State	7	–	12	.368	14	–	13	.519
Washington	4	–	16	.200	5	–	21	.192
California	3	–	17	.150	9	–	20	.310
† Conference tournament winner *Ineligible for the conference and NCAA tournaments due to self-imposed postseason ban. Rankings from AP poll

2020–21 Patriot League men's basketball standings
	Conf.				Overall
Team	W		L	PCT	W		L	PCT
North
Colgate †	11	–	1	.917	14	–	2	.875
Army	7	–	7	.500	12	–	10	.545
Boston University	6	–	10	.375	7	–	11	.389
Holy Cross	5	–	11	.313	5	–	11	.313
Central
Lafayette	9	–	5	.643	9	–	6	.600
Bucknell	4	–	6	.400	5	–	7	.417
Lehigh	4	–	10	.286	4	–	11	.267
South
Navy	12	–	1	.923	15	–	3	.833
American	4	–	5	.444	4	–	6	.400
Loyola	4	–	10	.286	6	–	11	.353
† 2021 Patriot League tournament winner

2020–21 Southeastern Conference men's basketball standings
	Conf.				Overall
Team	W		L	PCT	W		L	PCT
No. 5 Alabama†	16	–	2	.889	26	–	7	.788
No. 10 Arkansas	13	–	4	.765	25	–	7	.781
LSU	11	–	6	.647	19	–	10	.655
Tennessee	10	–	7	.588	18	–	9	.667
Florida	9	–	7	.563	15	–	10	.600
Ole Miss	10	–	8	.556	16	–	12	.571
Missouri	8	–	8	.500	16	–	10	.615
Kentucky	8	–	9	.471	9	–	16	.360
Mississippi State	8	–	10	.444	18	–	15	.545
Georgia	7	–	11	.389	14	–	12	.538
Auburn^{*}	7	–	11	.389	13	–	14	.481
South Carolina	4	–	12	.250	6	–	15	.286
Texas A&M	2	–	8	.200	8	–	10	.444
Vanderbilt	3	–	13	.188	9	–	16	.360
† 2021 SEC tournament winner^{*} Ineligible for postseason due to self-imposed postseason ban.

2020–21 Southern Conference men's basketball standings
	Conf.				Overall
Team	W		L	PCT	W		L	PCT
UNC Greensboro †	13	–	5	.722	21	–	9	.700
Wofford	12	–	5	.706	15	–	9	.625
Furman	10	–	5	.667	16	–	9	.640
Chattanooga	9	–	7	.563	18	–	8	.692
East Tennessee State	8	–	7	.533	13	–	12	.520
VMI	7	–	7	.500	13	–	12	.520
Mercer	8	–	9	.471	18	–	11	.621
The Citadel	5	–	11	.313	13	–	12	.520
Western Carolina	4	–	13	.235	11	–	16	.407
Samford	2	–	9	.182	6	–	13	.316
† 2021 SoCon tournament winner

2020–21 Southland Conference men's basketball standings
	Conf.				Overall
Team	W		L	PCT	W		L	PCT
Nicholls	14	–	2	.875	18	–	7	.720
Abilene Christian †	13	–	2	.867	24	–	5	.828
Sam Houston State	13	–	3	.813	19	–	9	.679
Stephen F. Austin*	12	–	3	.800	16	–	5	.762
Northwestern State	9	–	7	.563	11	–	18	.379
New Orleans	8	–	7	.533	10	–	15	.400
Lamar	6	–	10	.375	10	–	18	.357
Incarnate Word	5	–	9	.357	8	–	14	.364
Southeastern Louisiana	5	–	10	.333	8	–	18	.308
McNeese State	4	–	10	.286	10	–	14	.417
Houston Baptist	4	–	11	.267	6	–	19	.240
Central Arkansas	4	–	12	.250	5	–	19	.208
Texas A&M–CC	2	–	13	.133	5	–	19	.208
† 2021 Southland tournament winner *Ineligible for postseason due to postseason ban

2020–21 SWAC men's basketball standings
	Conf.				Overall
Team	W		L	PCT	W		L	PCT
Prairie View A&M	13	–	0	1.000	16	–	5	.762
Jackson State	11	–	0	1.000	12	–	6	.667
Texas Southern †	10	–	3	.769	17	–	9	.654
Grambling State	9	–	6	.600	12	–	12	.500
Southern	8	–	6	.571	8	–	11	.421
Alcorn State	6	–	7	.462	6	–	13	.316
Alabama A&M*	4	–	9	.308	6	–	9	.400
Alabama State*	4	–	14	.222	4	–	14	.222
Arkansas–Pine Bluff	3	–	12	.200	4	–	21	.160
Mississippi Valley State	2	–	13	.133	2	–	22	.083
† 2021 SWAC tournament winner *Ineligible for postseason due to APR violations

2020–21 Summit League men's basketball standings
	Conf.				Overall
Team	W		L	PCT	W		L	PCT
South Dakota State	9	–	3	.750	16	–	7	.696
South Dakota	11	–	4	.733	14	–	11	.560
North Dakota State	11	–	5	.688	15	–	12	.556
Oral Roberts †	10	–	5	.667	18	–	11	.621
North Dakota	8	–	8	.500	9	–	17	.346
Kansas City	7	–	7	.500	11	–	13	.458
Western Illinois	5	–	9	.357	7	–	15	.318
Omaha	3	–	11	.214	5	–	20	.200
Denver	1	–	13	.071	2	–	19	.095
† 2021 Summit League Tournament winner

2020–21 Sun Belt Conference men's basketball standings
	Conf.				Overall
Team	W		L	PCT	W		L	PCT
East
Georgia State	8	–	4	.667	16	–	6	.727
Coastal Carolina	9	–	5	.643	18	–	8	.692
South Alabama	10	–	7	.588	17	–	11	.607
Appalachian State †	7	–	8	.467	17	–	12	.586
Georgia Southern	7	–	9	.438	13	–	13	.500
Troy	4	–	12	.250	11	–	17	.393
West
Texas State	12	–	3	.800	18	–	7	.720
Louisiana	10	–	7	.588	17	–	9	.654
UT Arlington	9	–	8	.529	13	–	13	.500
Arkansas State	7	–	8	.467	11	–	13	.458
Little Rock	7	–	11	.389	11	–	15	.423
Louisiana–Monroe	5	–	13	.278	7	–	19	.269
† 2021 Sun Belt Tournament winner

2020–21 WAC men's basketball standings
	Conf.				Overall
Team	W		L	PCT	W		L	PCT
Grand Canyon †	9	–	3	.750	17	–	7	.708
Utah Valley	9	–	4	.692	11	–	11	.500
New Mexico State	7	–	6	.538	12	–	8	.600
California Baptist*	6	–	6	.500	13	–	10	.565
Seattle	4	–	5	.444	12	–	11	.522
Tarleton State*	5	–	7	.417	10	–	10	.500
Dixie State*	4	–	10	.286	8	–	13	.381
Texas–Rio Grande Valley	2	–	5	.286	9	–	10	.474
Chicago State	0	–	0	–	0	–	9	.000
† 2021 WAC tournament winner * Ineligible for the 2021 NCAA tournament due to transition period Chicago State suspended their season on December 23, 2020

2020–21 West Coast Conference men's basketball standings
	Conf.				Overall
Team	W		L	PCT	W		L	PCT
No. 1 Gonzaga †	15	–	0	1.000	31	–	1	.969
No. 23 BYU	10	–	3	.769	20	–	7	.741
Loyola Marymount	7	–	5	.583	13	–	9	.591
Pepperdine	7	–	6	.538	15	–	12	.556
Pacific	6	–	7	.462	9	–	9	.500
Santa Clara	4	–	5	.444	12	–	8	.600
Saint Mary's	4	–	6	.400	14	–	10	.583
San Francisco	4	–	9	.308	11	–	14	.440
San Diego	2	–	7	.222	3	–	11	.214
Portland	0	–	11	.000	6	–	15	.286
† 2021 WCC tournament winner Rankings from AP poll

== Award winners ==
=== 2021 Consensus All-America team ===
Consensus First Team
Player	Position	Class	Team
Jared Butler	PG	Junior	Baylor
Cade Cunningham	PG/SG	Freshman	Oklahoma State
Ayo Dosunmu	PG	Junior	Illinois
Luka Garza	C	Senior	Iowa
Corey Kispert	SF	Senior	Gonzaga

Consensus Second Team
Player	Position	Class	Team
Kofi Cockburn	C	Sophomore	Illinois
Hunter Dickinson	C	Freshman	Michigan
Evan Mobley	PF/C	Freshman	USC
Jalen Suggs	PG/SG	Freshman	Gonzaga
Drew Timme	PF	Sophomore	Gonzaga

=== Major player of the year awards ===
- Wooden Award: Luka Garza, Iowa
- Naismith Award: Luka Garza, Iowa
- Associated Press Player of the Year: Luka Garza, Iowa
- NABC Player of the Year: Luka Garza, Iowa
- Oscar Robertson Trophy (USBWA): Luka Garza, Iowa
- Sporting News Player of the Year: Luka Garza, Iowa

=== Major freshman of the year awards ===
- Wayman Tisdale Award (USBWA): Cade Cunningham, Oklahoma State
- NABC Freshman of the Year: Cade Cunningham, Oklahoma State
- Sporting News Freshman of the Year: Cade Cunningham, Oklahoma State

=== Major coach of the year awards ===
- Associated Press Coach of the Year: Juwan Howard, Michigan
- Henry Iba Award (USBWA): Juwan Howard, Michigan
- NABC Coach of the Year: Mark Few, Gonzaga
- Naismith College Coach of the Year: Mark Few, Gonzaga
- Sporting News Coach of the Year: Juwan Howard, Michigan

=== Other major awards ===
- Naismith Starting Five:
  - Bob Cousy Award (best point guard): Ayo Dosunmu, Illinois
  - Jerry West Award (best shooting guard): Chris Duarte, Oregon
  - Julius Erving Award (best small forward): Corey Kispert, Gonzaga
  - Karl Malone Award (best power forward): Drew Timme, Gonzaga
  - Kareem Abdul-Jabbar Award (best center): Luka Garza, Iowa
- Pete Newell Big Man Award (best big man): Luka Garza, Iowa
- NABC Defensive Player of the Year: Davion Mitchell, Baylor
- Naismith Defensive Player of the Year: Davion Mitchell, Baylor
- Senior CLASS Award (top senior on and off the court): Luka Garza, Iowa
- Robert V. Geasey Trophy (top player in Philadelphia Big 5): Collin Gillespie, Villanova
- Haggerty Award (top player in NYC metro area): Sandro Mamukelashvili, Seton Hall
- Ben Jobe Award (top minority coach): Leonard Hamilton, Florida State
- Hugh Durham Award (top mid-major coach): Byron Smith, Prairie View A&M
- Jim Phelan Award (top head coach): Todd Simon, Southern Utah
- Lefty Driesell Award (top defensive player): Davion Mitchell, Baylor
- Lou Henson Award (top mid-major player): Max Abmas, Oral Roberts
- Lute Olson Award (top non-freshman or transfer player): Luka Garza, Iowa
- Skip Prosser Man of the Year Award (coach with moral character): Lew Hill, UTRGV
- Academic All-American of the Year (top scholar-athlete): Corey Kispert, Gonzaga
- Elite 90 Award (top GPA among upperclass players at Final Four): Russell Stong, UCLA
- Perry Wallace Most Courageous Award: This award was not presented to a Division I basketball figure. The award went to the men's basketball team of NAIA Bluefield College, which decided to kneel during the pregame playing of the national anthem on February 8, 2021, in defiance of orders from the college's president.

== Coaching changes ==
Fifty-six teams changed coaches during the season and after it ended. Two schools changed coaches between their first practice and first game of the season. One coach resigned and one died.

Team	Former coach	Interim coach	New coach	Reason
Abilene Christian	Joe Golding		Brette Tanner	Golding left Abilene Christian on April 13, 2021, after ten seasons for the head coaching position at UTEP. In his ten seasons as head coach, Golding led his alma mater to their first two Division I NCAA tournament appearances in school history. Associate head coach Tanner was promoted by the Wildcats to fill the vacancy the next day.
Albany	Will Brown		Dwayne Killings	Brown and Albany mutually agreed to part ways on March 1, 2021, after 20 seasons. Brown led the Great Danes to a 315–295 overall record and five America East tournament championships during his tenure. Dwayne Killings, previously an assistant coach at Marquette, was hired to replace Brown on March 15.
Arizona	Sean Miller		Tommy Lloyd	Arizona parted ways with Miller on April 7, 2021, after 12 seasons. Despite his 302–109 record at UA, Miller was linked to alleged violations of NCAA rules stemming from a 2017 federal investigation into corruption in college basketball. Gonzaga associate head coach Tommy Lloyd, who had previously been the designated successor to Gonzaga head coach Mark Few, was hired as the Wildcats next head coach on April 14.
Arkansas–Pine Bluff	George Ivory		Solomon Bozeman	Ivory resigned from UAPB on April 6, 2021, after 13 seasons and a 140–269 overall record. The Golden Lions hired Oral Roberts assistant Bozeman on June 11.
Austin Peay	Matt Figger		Nate James	Figger left Austin Peay on March 29, 2021, after four seasons for the UTRGV head coaching job. On April 2, the Governors named Duke associate head coach Nate James as their new head coach.
Bethune-Cookman	Ryan Ridder		Reggie Theus	Ridder left BCU on March 30, 2021, after three seasons for the head coaching job at UT Martin. On July 3, ESPN reported that BCU had hired former NBA star Theus, also with head coaching experience with the Sacramento Kings, New Mexico State, and Cal State Northridge, in the dual role of head coach and athletic director; BCU's official announcement came on July 7.
Binghamton	Tommy Dempsey	Levell Sanders		Binghamton fired Dempsey on March 1, 2021, after nine seasons, in which the Bearcats went 72–194 overall and never finished higher than 6th place in the America East. Assistant coach Sanders was named the interim head coach of the team for the 2021–22 season. On February 17, 2022, Sanders had the interim tag removed and was named permanent head coach of the team.
Boston College	Jim Christian	Scott Spinelli	Earl Grant	Christian was fired on February 15, 2021, after 6½ seasons at Boston College, in which the Eagles were 78–132 overall, including a 3–13 overall record and a 1–9 record in ACC play this season at the time of Christian's dismissal. Assistant coach Spinelli was named interim head coach for the rest of the season. On March 15, Charleston head coach Earl Grant was hired as BC's new coach.
Cal State Northridge	Mark Gottfried	Trent Johnson		Gottfried, who had completed his 3rd season at CSUN, was placed on paid administrative leave by the university, along with his coaching staff, on April 29, 2021, pending an investigation of rule violations within the program. Johnson, who had been serving as the Deputy Analyst and Player Development Director at UC Berkeley for the past 2 years, was named interim head coach of the Matadors for the 2021–22 season on July 22. On March 17, CSUN removed the interim tag from Johnson and named him head coach.
Central Connecticut	Donyell Marshall		Patrick Sellers	Marshall announced his resignation on March 5, 2021, after five seasons and a 43–103 overall record at Central Connecticut. Fairfield assistant coach and CCSU alum Sellers was hired by the Blue Devils on May 10.
Central Michigan	Keno Davis		Tony Barbee	Central Michigan parted ways with Davis on April 5, 2021, after nine seasons and a 142–143 overall record. Kentucky assistant Tony Barbee, formerly the head coach at UTEP and Auburn, was hired by the Chippewas on April 23.
Chicago State	Lance Irvin		Gerald Gillion	Irvin and Chicago State mutually agreed to part ways on July 1, 2021, after three seasons and a 7–63 overall record. Samford assistant Gillion was hired by the Cougars on July 19.
Cincinnati	John Brannen		Wes Miller	Cincinnati fired Brannen after two seasons on April 9, 2021, following an internal review of unspecified allegations related to Brannen and the program. The investigation was triggered after six players entered the NCAA transfer portal within three days of the Bearcats' final game of the season. The Bearcats hired UNC Greensboro head coach Wes Miller as his replacement on April 14.
College of Charleston	Earl Grant		Pat Kelsey	Grant left Charleston on March 15, 2021, after seven seasons for the Boston College head coaching job. The Cougars stayed in-state for their next hire, naming Winthrop head coach Kelsey for the position on March 25.
Delaware State	Eric Skeeters		Stan Waterman	Delaware State parted ways with Skeeters on April 1, 2021, after three seasons and a 15–67 overall record. Stan Waterman, head coach of Sanford School for the past 30 years, was hired by the Hornets on June 3.
Denver	Rodney Billups		Jeff Wulbrun	Denver parted ways with Billups on March 1, 2021, after five seasons and a 48–94 overall record. Stanford associate head coach Wulbrun was hired by the Pioneers as their new coach on March 29.
DePaul	Dave Leitao		Tony Stubblefield	DePaul fired Leitao on March 15, 2021, after six seasons of his second stint as Blue Demons head coach (he had previously held that position from 2002 to 2005), following five straight seasons in which the Blue Demons finished last in the Big East. On April 6, the Blue Demons hired Oregon assistant Stubblefield as their next head coach.
East Tennessee State	Jason Shay		Desmond Oliver	Shay resigned from ETSU on March 30, 2021, almost 11 months after he was promoted to head coach of the team. On April 5, the Buccaneers hired Tennessee assistant coach Desmond Oliver as their next head coach.
Eastern Illinois	Jay Spoonhour		Marty Simmons	Eastern Illinois did not renew Spoonhour's contract on March 4, 2021, ending his nine-year tenure at the school with a 119–157 record. On March 31, the Panthers hired Clemson assistant coach and former Evansville head coach Marty Simmons as Spoonhour's replacement.
Eastern Michigan	Rob Murphy		Stan Heath	Eastern Michigan parted ways with Murphy on March 17, 2021, after ten seasons and a 166–155 record. On April 12, the Eagles announced the hire of former Arkansas and South Florida coach and EMU alumnus Stan Heath as their next head coach.
Eastern Washington	Shantay Legans		David Riley	On March 22, 2021, it was confirmed that Legans would leave Eastern Washington after four seasons for the head coaching job at Portland. On March 25, the Eagles announced that associate head coach Riley would be elevated to the head position.
Fordham	Jeff Neubauer	Mike DePaoli	Kyle Neptune	Neubauer was fired on January 26, 2021, after 5½ seasons at Fordham, in which the Rams went 61–104 overall, including a 1–7 start to the season. Assistant coach DePaoli was named interim head coach for the remainder of the season. On March 30, the school named Villanova assistant coach Kyle Neptune its new head coach.
George Mason	Dave Paulsen		Kim English	George Mason dismissed Paulsen after six seasons on March 16, 2021. He finished with an overall record of 95–91 (46–54 in A-10 play) at the school. On March 23, the Patriots hired former Tennessee assistant Kim English as their next head coach.
Hofstra	Joe Mihalich		Speedy Claxton	On March 19, 2021, Hofstra announced that Mihalich will transition into a new role as special advisor to the director of athletics. Mihalich spent seven seasons with a 141–92 overall record with the program, but missed the entire 2020–21 season due to an unspecified medical issue. Assistant coach and former Pride star player Claxton was promoted to the head coaching position on April 7.
Indiana	Archie Miller		Mike Woodson	Indiana fired Miller on March 15, 2021, after four seasons with a 67–56 record and no NCAA tournament appearances. On March 28, New York Knicks assistant and former NBA head coach Mike Woodson, an Indiana alum, was hired as the Hoosiers next head coach, signing a six-year deal.
Indiana State	Greg Lansing		Josh Schertz	Lansing's 11-year tenure at Indiana State ended on March 8, 2021, after his contract was not renewed, leaving with a 181–164 overall record. On March 17, the Sycamores went to Division II for their new coach, hiring Lincoln Memorial head coach Josh Schertz.
Iowa State	Steve Prohm		T. J. Otzelberger	Iowa State and Prohm mutually agreed to part ways on March 15, 2021, after six seasons and a 97–95 overall record, including a 2–22 overall record and winless record in conference play this season. Iowa State hired Otzelberger, a former Cyclone assistant coach, from UNLV on March 18, 2021.
Jacksonville	Tony Jasick		Jordan Mincy	Jacksonville fired Jasick on March 8, 2021, after seven seasons and a 95–123 overall record. Florida assistant coach Mincy was hired as the Dolphins' new head coach on March 25.
Lamar	Tic Price		Alvin Brooks	Lamar parted ways with Price on March 21, 2021, after seven seasons and a 112–113 record. On April 1, Lamar announced the hiring of former Cardinal player and current Houston associate head coach Brooks as head coach.
Loyola–Chicago	Porter Moser		Drew Valentine	On April 3, 2021, Moser left Loyola–Chicago after ten seasons to accept the head coaching job at Oklahoma. The Ramblers promoted assistant coach Valentine to head coach that same day.
Marquette	Steve Wojciechowski		Shaka Smart	Marquette fired Wojciehowski on March 19, 2021, after seven seasons and a 128–95 overall record. The Golden Eagles hired Texas head coach Shaka Smart to the same position on March 26.
McNeese State	Heath Schroyer		John Aiken	Schroyer stepped down from his head coaching position on March 11, 2021, after three seasons to become the full-time athletic director of McNeese State, having initially served as the interim AD since June 2020. Associate head coach Aiken was promoted to head coach of the Cowboys effective immediately.
Minnesota	Richard Pitino		Ben Johnson	Minnesota fired Pitino on March 15, 2021, after eight seasons. Despite two NCAA tournament appearances, along with an NIT championship, the Golden Gophers were 141–123 overall and 54–96 in conference play during his tenure. On March 22, the school hired Xavier assistant coach and Minnesota alum Ben Johnson as its new head coach.
New Mexico	Paul Weir		Richard Pitino	New Mexico announced on February 26, 2021, that Weir and the school had mutually agreed to part ways at the end of the season. At the time of the announcement, the Lobos were 6–14 overall and 2–14 in conference play this season, and were 58–61 during Weir's four-year tenure. On March 16, the school hired Richard Pitino, who had been fired from Minnesota less than 24 hours earlier, as its new head coach.
North Carolina	Roy Williams		Hubert Davis	On April 1, 2021, Williams announced his retirement after 33 seasons as head coach, the last 18 seasons spent at North Carolina, where the Tar Heels went 485–163 with a trip to five Final Fours and three national championships in 2005, 2009, and 2017. On April 5, UNC assistant coach and former star player Hubert Davis was promoted to head coach, making him the first African-American head coach of the program.
Northern Illinois	Mark Montgomery	Lamar Chapman	Rashon Burno	Montgomery was fired on January 3, 2021, after 9½ years at Northern Illinois, in which the Huskies went 124–170 overall, including a 1–7 start to the season. Assistant coach Chapman was named interim head coach for the rest of the season. Arizona State assistant coach Burno was hired as NIU's new head coach on March 6.
Oklahoma	Lon Kruger		Porter Moser	On March 25, 2021, Kruger announced his retirement after 36 seasons as head coach, the last ten seasons spent at Oklahoma, where the Sooners went 195–128 with a trip to the Final Four in 2016. On April 3, the Sooners hired Loyola–Chicago coach Moser as their next head coach.
Pacific	Damon Stoudamire		Leonard Perry	Stoudemire left Pacific after five seasons to join the coaching staff of the Boston Celtics and was replaced by top assistant Perry on July 7.
Portland	Terry Porter	Ben Johnson	Shantay Legans	After a 43–103 overall record in 4½ seasons, including a 6–11 overall record and 0–8 conference record to start the season, Portland fired Porter on February 5, 2021. Assistant coach Johnson served as the Pilots' interim head coach for the rest of the season. On March 22, it was confirmed that Portland would hire Eastern Washington head coach Legans to the head coaching position.
Portland State	Barret Peery		Jase Coburn	Peery left Portland State on April 6, 2021, after four seasons to become associate head coach at Texas Tech. The Vikings promoted associate head coach Coburn to the head coaching position on April 16.
Radford	Mike Jones		Darris Nichols	Jones left Radford on April 19, 2021, after ten seasons for the head coaching job at UNC Greensboro. Florida assistant coach Nichols was hired by the Highlanders on April 21.
San Jose State	Jean Prioleau		Tim Miles	San Jose State fired Prioleau on March 12, 2021, after four seasons and a 20–93 overall record. The Spartans announced the hire of former North Dakota State, Colorado State, and Nebraska head coach Miles as their next head coach on April 6.
South Carolina State	Murray Garvin		Tony Madlock	SC State parted ways with Garvin on March 15, 2021, after nine seasons and an 82–168 overall record. The Bulldogs named Memphis assistant coach Madlock as their new head coach on March 25.
Texas	Shaka Smart		Chris Beard	Smart left Texas on March 26, 2021, after six seasons to accept the head coaching job at Marquette. The Longhorns announced on April 1 that Texas Tech head coach and Texas alumnus Beard had accepted the head coaching position.
Texas A&M–CC	Willis Wilson		Steve Lutz	The 61-year-old Wilson announced his retirement from coaching on March 24, 2021, after 28 seasons overall as head coach, with the last 11 at A&M–CC. Purdue assistant coach Lutz was hired by the Islanders' as his replacement on April 6.
Texas Tech	Chris Beard		Mark Adams	Beard left Texas Tech on April 1, 2021, after five seasons to accept the head coaching job at Texas. The Red Raiders elevated top assistant Adams to head coach on April 5.
UMBC	Ryan Odom		Jim Ferry	Odom left UMBC on April 5, 2021, after five seasons for the Utah State head coaching position. On April 12, UMBC announced the hire of former Penn State interim coach Ferry as its next head coach.
UNC Greensboro	Wes Miller		Mike Jones	Miller left UNCG after ten seasons to accept the head coaching position at Cincinnati on April 14, 2021. The Spartans hired Radford head coach Mike Jones on April 19.
UNLV	T. J. Otzelberger		Kevin Kruger	Otzelberger left UNLV on March 18, 2021, after two seasons for the Iowa State head coaching job. On March 21, the Runnin' Rebels announced that current assistant coach Kruger will be promoted to the head coaching position.
UT Arlington	Chris Ogden		Greg Young	Ogden left UT Arlington on April 1, 2021, after three seasons to accept an assistant coaching position on Chris Beard's staff at his alma mater Texas. The Mavericks promoted longtime assistant coach Greg Young to the head coaching position on April 6.
UTEP	Rodney Terry		Joe Golding	Terry left UTEP on April 6, 2021, after three seasons to accept an assistant coaching position on Chris Beard's staff at Texas. The Miners announced the hiring of Abilene Christian head coach Golding as its next head coach on April 13.
UT Martin	Anthony Stewart	Montez Robinson	Ryan Ridder	UT Martin announced Stewart's sudden death on November 15, 2020. The 50-year-old was set to start his fifth season as head coach of the Skyhawks, having amassed a 51–73 record during his tenure at the school. Two days later, assistant coach Robinson, who was hired by the team in September, was named interim head coach for the 2020–21 season. After Robinson was not retained at the end of the season, the school hired Bethune–Cookman head coach Ryan Ridder as its new coach on March 30.
UTRGV	Lew Hill	Jai Steadman	Matt Figger	Hill died on February 7, 2021. The 55-year-old was in his fifth season as head coach at Texas–Rio Grande Valley, amassing a record of 67–75 during his tenure at the school and had been preparing to step down after the season due to ongoing medical issues, including a bout with COVID. Four days after Hill's death, assistant coach Steadman was named interim head coach of the Vaqueros for the rest of the season. After the season ended, the school hired Austin Peay head coach Figger on March 29.
Utah	Larry Krystkowiak		Craig Smith	Utah fired Krystowiak on March 16, 2021, after ten seasons with an overall record of 183–139. The Utes hired Craig Smith from cross-state rival Utah State as their next head coach on March 27.
Utah State	Craig Smith		Ryan Odom	Smith left Utah State after three seasons to take the head coaching position at cross-state rival Utah on March 27, 2021. The Aggies announced the hire of UMBC head coach Odom as their next head coach on April 5.
Western Carolina	Mark Prosser		Justin Gray	Prosser left Western Carolina on April 2, 2021, after three seasons for the head coaching position at Winthrop. Ironically enough, the Catamounts hired Justin Gray, a former Winthrop assistant coach who had followed Pat Kelsey to the College of Charleston, on April 13.
Wichita State	Gregg Marshall	Isaac Brown		Marshall, the program's winningest head coach with 331 wins, resigned from Wichita State on November 17, 2020, after 13 seasons following an investigation into reports of physical and verbal abuse of players. Assistant coach Brown was initially named the interim head coach of the Shockers for the 2020–21 season, and had the interim tag removed and was officially named the new head coach on February 26, 2021.
Winthrop	Pat Kelsey		Mark Prosser	Kelsey left Winthrop on March 25, 2021, after nine seasons for the head coaching position at Charleston. On April 2, Winthrop announced the hiring of former Eagle assistant coach Prosser from Western Carolina as their next head coach.

== See also ==
- 2020–21 NCAA Division I women's basketball season
