= Yuat Alok =

South Sudanese-New Zealand basketball player

No. 19 – Homenetmen Beirut
- Position: Power forward / centre
- League: Lebanese Basketball League

Personal information
- Born: 1 January 1997 (age 29) Kakuma, Kenya
- Listed height: 6 ft 11 in (2.11 m)
- Listed weight: 230 lb (104 kg)

Career information
- High school: Rangitoto College (Auckland, New Zealand); Impact Academy (Sarasota, Florida)
- College: Chipola (2016–2018); TCU (2018); Coppin State (2020–2021); New Mexico State (2021–2022)
- NBA draft: 2022: undrafted
- Playing career: 2014–present

Career history
- 2014–2015: New Zealand Breakers
- 2022: Enosis Neon Paralimni
- 2023–2024: KK Alkar
- 2024: Al Hilal
- 2024: Marineros de Puerto Plata
- 2024: Club Central Jounieh
- 2024: Mighty Barrolle
- 2024–2025: Al Morog
- 2025–present: Homenetmen Beirut

Career highlights
- NBL champion (2015); 2× Second-team All-Panhandle (2017, 2018)

Yuat Kuol Alok (born 1 January 1997) is a South Sudanese-New Zealand professional basketball player for Homenetmen Beirut of the Lebanese Basketball League. He played college basketball in the United States for four different colleges between 2016 and 2022. He made his professional debut in 2022 in Cyprus with Enosis Neon Paralimni.

== Early life and career ==
Alok was born in Kakuma, Kenya. His mother, Aluel Deng, fled South Sudan during the Second Sudanese Civil War. She arrived at a refugee camp in Kakuma in 1996, where Alok was born a few months later. The family later moved into a house built of mud in a small village in Southern Kenya near the Maasai tribe with his grandmother. There he played soccer with friends and was homeschooled by his mother. She taught him Swahili, Arabic, Dinka and Turkana. Violence and conflicts forced them back into refugee camps across the country, and at one point a refugee camp in Ethiopia.

In 2005, Alok and his family moved to New Zealand. They initially lived in a resettlement camp in Auckland.

At age 14, Alok had a growth spurt from 6-foot-5 to 6-foot-10 and he subsequently started playing basketball. A year later, he joined the New Zealand Breakers academy. He attended Rangitoto College in Auckland.

In August 2014, Alok signed with the New Zealand Breakers of the Australian National Basketball League (NBL) as a development player for the 2014–15 season. He appeared in two games for the Breakers in January 2015 and was a member of the team's championship victory in March 2015.

For the 2015–16 school year, Alok moved to the United States to attend Impact Academy in Sarasota, Florida.

== College career ==
As a freshman and sophomore in 2016–17 and 2017–18, Alok played college basketball at Chipola College, where he was a second-team All-Panhandle Conference selection both years. As a sophomore, he averaged 12.3 points and 7.0 rebounds per game.

In 2018, Alok transferred to NCAA Division I program TCU, choosing the Horned Frogs over Baylor, Florida and USC. He played 10 games for TCU to begin the 2018–19 season, averaging 3.3 points and 2.5 rebounds in 13.1 minutes per game, before suffering a season-ending hand injury.

In January 2019, Alok transferred to UCF. He never played a game for the Knights after he was ruled ineligible due to academic reasons.

In January 2020, Alok transferred to Southern Utah. He never played in a game for the Thunderbirds and eventually made his way to Coppin State, playing 11 games in 2020–21. He was named to the 2021 MEAC All-Tournament Team.

In July 2021, Alok joined New Mexico State as a graduate transfer. In 2021–22, he saw time in 30 of the team's 34 contests, making six appearances in the starting lineup. He averaged 4.7 points and 1.7 rebounds in 10.0 minutes per game.

== Professional career ==
Alok made his professional debut in the 2022–23 season with Enosis Neon Paralimni of the Cypriot League. In seven games between 8 October and 26 November, he averaged 11.0 points, 5.4 rebounds and 1.3 assists per game.

For the 2023–24 season, Alok joined KK Alkar of the Croatian League. In 29 games, he averaged 11.6 points and 6.7 rebounds per game.

In May 2024, Alok joined Al Hilal of the Libyan League.

In August 2024, Alok had a six-game stint with Marineros de Puerto Plata of the Liga Nacional de Baloncesto.

In September 2024, Alok signed with Club Central Jounieh of the Lebanese Basketball League. In November 2024, he joined Mighty Barrolle of the Liberia Basketball Association Division 1. He appeared in two games for Barrolle. In December 2024, he joined Al Morog of the Libyan Division I Basketball League. In January 2025, he joined Homenetmen Beirut of the Lebanese Basketball League.

== National team ==
In 2013, Alok played for New Zealand at the FIBA Oceania U16 Championship.

== Personal life ==
Alok is a cousin of fellow basketball players, Lat Mayen and Kouat Noi.
