= 2020–21 Morgan State Bears basketball team =

American college basketball season

2020–21 Morgan State Bears men's basketball
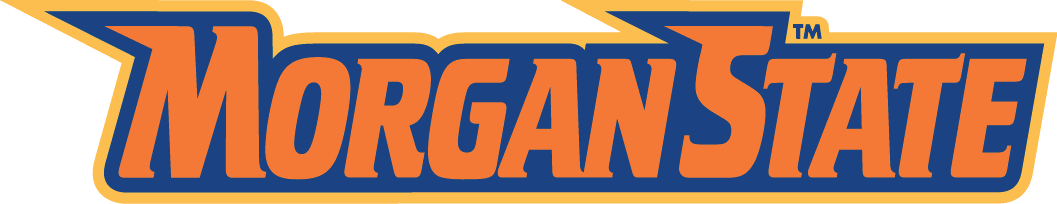
- Conference: Mid-Eastern Athletic Conference
- Northern Division
- Record: 14–8 (7–5 MEAC)
- Head coach: Kevin Broadus (2nd season)
- Assistant coaches: Brian Merritt; Chretien Lukusa; Kevin Jones
- Home arena: Talmadge L. Hill Field House

2020–21 MEAC men's basketball standings
| | Conf. | | | | Overall |
| Team | W | | L | PCT | W | | L | PCT |
|---|---|---|---|---|---|---|---|---|
Northern
| Norfolk State † | 8 | – | 4 | .667 | 17 | – | 8 | .680 |
| Coppin State | 8 | – | 4 | .667 | 9 | – | 13 | .409 |
| Morgan State | 7 | – | 5 | .583 | 14 | – | 8 | .636 |
| Delaware State | 1 | – | 11 | .083 | 3 | – | 16 | .158 |
| Howard | 0 | – | 0 | – | 1 | – | 4 | .200 |
Southern
| North Carolina A&T | 7 | – | 1 | .875 | 11 | – | 10 | .524 |
| Florida A&M | 7 | – | 5 | .583 | 8 | – | 12 | .400 |
| North Carolina Central | 3 | – | 5 | .375 | 5 | – | 9 | .357 |
| South Carolina State | 1 | – | 7 | .125 | 1 | – | 17 | .056 |
† 2021 MEAC tournament winner Howard suspended their season on February 9, 2021; Bethune–Cookman and Maryland Eastern Shore did not play the 2020–21 season due to COVID-19 concerns.

The 2020–21 Morgan State Bears men's basketball team represented Morgan State University in the 2020–21 NCAA Division I men's basketball season. The Bears, led by second-year head coach Kevin Broadus, played their home games at Talmadge L. Hill Field House in Baltimore, Maryland as members of the Mid-Eastern Athletic Conference. With the creation of divisions to cut down on travel due to the COVID-19 pandemic, they played in the Northern Division.

== Previous season ==
The Bears finished the 2019–20 season 15–16, 9–7 in MEAC play to finish in sixth place. They were scheduled to play against Bethune–Cookman in the quarterfinals of the MEAC tournament, but the remainder of the tournament was cancelled due to the ongoing COVID-19 pandemic.

== Roster ==
2020–21 Morgan State Bears men's basketball team
Players
Coaches

| Pos. | # | Name | Height | Weight | Year | Previous school | Hometown |
|---|---|---|---|---|---|---|---|
| F | 0 | Lagio Grantsaan | 6 ft 8 in (2.03 m) | 235 lb (107 kg) | Sr | Northwest College | Utrecht, Netherlands |
| F | 1 | Troy Baxter | 6 ft 9 in (2.06 m) | 200 lb (91 kg) | Sr | Florida Gulf Coast | Tallahassee, Florida |
| G | 2 | Isaiah Burke | 6 ft 1 in (1.85 m) | 180 lb (82 kg) | Jr | Bowie High School | Bowie, Maryland |
| G | 3 | Moel Camara | 6 ft 5 in (1.96 m) | 180 lb (82 kg) | Jr | Baltimore City Community College | Baltimore, Maryland |
| G | 4 | Naseem Khaalid | 6 ft 2 in (1.88 m) | 180 lb (82 kg) | Fr | First Coast High School | Sumter, South Carolina |
| G | 5 | Sherwyn Devonish | 6 ft 1 in (1.85 m) | 192 lb (87 kg) | Jr | Wise High School | Bladensburg, Maryland |
| F | 10 | Victor Okafor | 6 ft 8 in (2.03 m) | 230 lb (104 kg) | Sr | Baltimore City Community College | Greenbelt, Maryland |
| G | 11 | Malik Miller | 6 ft 4 in (1.93 m) | 191 lb (87 kg) | Jr | Friendship Tech Prep | Washington, D.C. |
| G | 12 | Thai're Vance | 6 ft 2 in (1.88 m) | 188 lb (85 kg) | So | DeMatha Catholic High School | Silver Spring, Maryland |
| G | 14 | Sharone Wright | 6 ft 5 in (1.96 m) | 185 lb (84 kg) | Jr | Wake Forest | Macon, Georgia |
| G | 15 | Tahj-Malik Campbell | 6 ft 5 in (1.96 m) | 180 lb (82 kg) | So | Mastery Charter North–Pickett HS | Philadelphia, Pennsylvania |
| G | 20 | De'Torrion Ware | 6 ft 4 in (1.93 m) | 200 lb (91 kg) | Jr | Jacksonville State | Hopkinsville, Kentucky |
| F | 21 | Peter Sorber | 6 ft 8 in (2.03 m) | 260 lb (118 kg) | So | Trenton Catholic Academy | Trenton, New Jersey |
| G | 24 | Elijah Bowens | 5 ft 11 in (1.8 m) | 170 lb (77 kg) | Jr | Christopher Newport | Bowie, Maryland |
| F | 32 | Chad Venning | 6 ft 10 in (2.08 m) | 280 lb (127 kg) | Fr | Woodstock Academy | Brooklyn, New York |
| F | 44 | Jamar Brown | 6 ft 9 in (2.06 m) | 250 lb (113 kg) | Sr | Wings Academy | Harlem, New York |
| G | 55 | Trevor Moore | 6 ft 5 in (1.96 m) | 195 lb (88 kg) | Jr | Cincinnati | Houston, Texas |

Head coach

- Kevin Broadus (Bowie State)

Assistant coach(es)

- Brian Merritt (Towson)
- Chretien Lukusa (Binghamton)
- Kevin Jones (Bowie State)

Legend

- (C) Team captain
- (S) Suspended
- (I) Ineligible
- (W) Walk-on
- Injured
- Current redshirt

Roster
Last update: January 3, 2021

== Schedule and results ==
| Date time, TV | Rank^{#} | Opponent^{#} | Result | Record | Site (attendance) city, state |
Regular season
| November 25, 2020*; 12:00 pm | | Mount St. Mary's | L 55–62 | 0–1 | Talmadge L. Hill Field House (50); Baltimore, MD |
| December 1, 2020*; 6:00 pm | | Lincoln (PA) | W 102–94 | 1–1 | Talmadge L. Hill Field House (20); Baltimore, MD |
| December 8, 2020*; 3:00 pm, ESPN3 | | at Iona | W 83–72 | 2–1 | Hynes Athletic Center; New Rochelle, NY |
| December 13, 2020*; 1:00 pm | | Bellarmine | Canceled due to COVID-19 | | Talmadge L. Hill Field House; Baltimore, MD |
| December 16, 2020*; 6:00 pm, ESPN+ | | at Navy | Canceled due to COVID-19 | | Alumni Hall; Annapolis, MD |
| December 19, 2020*; 2:00 pm | | West Virginia Tech | L 67–73 | 2–2 | Talmadge L. Hill Field House; Baltimore, MD |
| December 21, 2020*; 7:00 pm, FloHoops | | at Delaware | W 65–59 | 3–2 | Bob Carpenter Center; Newark, DE |
| December 30, 2020*; 6:00 pm, FloHoops | | at Towson | Canceled due to COVID-19 | | SECU Arena; Towson, MD |
| January 3, 2021*; 6:00 pm, FloHoops | | at James Madison | W 80–73 | 4–2 | Atlantic Union Bank Center; Harrisonburg, VA |
| January 9, 2021; 2:00 pm, FloHoops | | at Norfolk State | W 78–74 | 5–2 (1–0) | Joseph G. Echols Memorial Hall (110); Norfolk, VA |
| January 10, 2021; 2:00 pm, FloHoops | | at Norfolk State | L 85–89 | 5–3 (1–1) | Joseph G. Echols Memorial Hall (137); Norfolk, VA |
| January 16, 2021; 2:00 pm | | Coppin State | W 92–72 | 6–3 (2–1) | Talmadge L. Hill Field House; Baltimore, MD |
| January 17, 2021; 2:00 pm | | Coppin State | L 79–89 | 6–4 (2–2) | Talmadge L. Hill Field House; Baltimore, MD |
| January 21, 2021*; 6:00 pm | | St. Mary's (MD) | W 99–41 | 7–4 | Talmadge L. Hill Field House; Baltimore, MD |
| January 23, 2021; 2:00 pm | | Howard | Canceled due to COVID-19 | | Talmadge L. Hill Field House; Baltimore, MD |
| January 24, 2021; 2:00 pm | | Delaware State | W 99–83 | 8–4 (3–2) | Talmadge L. Hill Field House; Baltimore, MD |
| January 30, 2021; 3:00 pm, FloHoops | | at Coppin State | W 79–76 | 9–4 (4–2) | Physical Education Complex; Baltimore, MD |
| February 2, 2021; 8:00 pm | | at Coppin State | W 95–82 | 10–4 (5–2) | Physical Education Complex; Baltimore, MD |
| February 6, 2021; 2:00 pm | | at Delaware State | W 74–69 | 11–4 (6–2) | Talmadge L. Hill Field House; Baltimore, MD |
| February 7, 2021; ESPN+ | | at Howard | Canceled due to COVID-19 | | Burr Gymnasium; Washington, D.C. |
| February 8, 2021; 7:00 pm, ESPNU | | at Howard | Canceled due to COVID-19 | | Burr Gymnasium; Washington, D.C. |
| February 13, 2021; 2:00 pm, FloHoops | | Norfolk State | L 69–74 | 11–5 (6–3) | Talmadge L. Hill Field House; Baltimore, MD |
| February 14, 2021; 2:00 pm, FloHoops | | Norfolk State | L 65–68 | 11–6 (6–4) | Talmadge L. Hill Field House; Baltimore, MD |
| March 5, 2021; 1:00 pm, YouTube | | at Delaware State | W 92–67 | 12–6 (7–4) | Memorial Hall; Dover, DE |
| March 6, 2021; 5:00 pm, YouTube | | at Delaware State | L 75–82 | 12–7 (7–5) | Memorial Hall; Dover, DE |
MEAC tournament
| March 11, 2021; 6:00 pm, FloHoops | (N3) | vs. (S2) Florida A&M; Quarterfinals | W 77–75 | 13–7 | Norfolk Scope; Norfolk, VA |
| March 12, 2021; 6:00 pm, FloHoops | (N3) | vs. (N1) Coppin State; Semifinals | W 82–61 | 14–7 | Norfolk Scope; Norfolk, VA |
| March 13, 2021; 1:00 pm, ESPN2 | (N3) | vs. (N2) Norfolk State; Championship | L 63–71 | 14–8 | Norfolk Scope; Norfolk, VA |
*Non-conference game. ^{#}Rankings from AP Poll. (#) Tournament seedings in parentheses. All times are in Eastern.
