= 2020–21 Florida A&M Rattlers basketball team =

American college basketball season

2020–21 Florida A&M Rattlers basketball
- Conference: Mid-Eastern Athletic Conference
- Southern Division
- Record: 8–12 (7–5 MEAC)
- Head coach: Robert McCullum (4th season)
- Assistant coaches: Willie Powers III; Jarrett Stephens; Isaac Brown
- Home arena: Al Lawson Center

2020–21 MEAC men's basketball standings
	Conf.				Overall
Team	W		L	PCT	W		L	PCT
Northern
Norfolk State †	8	–	4	.667	17	–	8	.680
Coppin State	8	–	4	.667	9	–	13	.409
Morgan State	7	–	5	.583	14	–	8	.636
Delaware State	1	–	11	.083	3	–	16	.158
Howard	0	–	0	–	1	–	4	.200
Southern
North Carolina A&T	7	–	1	.875	11	–	10	.524
Florida A&M	7	–	5	.583	8	–	12	.400
North Carolina Central	3	–	5	.375	5	–	9	.357
South Carolina State	1	–	7	.125	1	–	17	.056
† 2021 MEAC tournament winner Howard suspended their season on February 9, 2021; Bethune–Cookman and Maryland Eastern Shore did not play the 2020–21 season due to COVID-19 concerns.

The 2020–21 Florida A&M Rattlers basketball team represented Florida A&M University in the 2020–21 NCAA Division I men's basketball season. The Rattlers, led by fourth-year head coach Robert McCullum, played their home games at the Al Lawson Center in Tallahassee, Florida as members of the Mid-Eastern Athletic Conference. With the creation of divisions to cut down on travel due to the COVID-19 pandemic, they played in the Southern division. They finished the season 8–12, 7–5 in MEAC play to finish in second place in the Southern division. They lost to Morgan State in the quarterfinals of the MEAC tournament.

The season marked the final season for Florida A&M as members of the MEAC as they rejoined the Southwestern Athletic Conference in 2021.

== Previous season ==
The Rattlers finished the 2019–20 season 12–15, 10–6 in MEAC play to finish in a tie for fourth place. Florida A&M was ineligible for postseason play due to improper certification of student-athletes.

== Roster ==
2020–21 Florida A&M Rattlers men's basketball team
Players
Coaches

Pos.	#	Name	Height	Weight	Year	Previous school	Hometown
G	0	Jahvon Smith	6 ft 4 in (1.93 m)	200 lb (91 kg)	Fr	Miami Norland HS	Hallandale Beach, FL
G	1	Jalen Speer	6 ft 1 in (1.85 m)	172 lb (78 kg)	Fr	The Rock School	Gainesville, FL
G	2	Kamron Reaves	6 ft 2 in (1.88 m)	170 lb (77 kg)	Sr	Centennial HS	Champaign, IL
G	3	M. J. Randolph	6 ft 4 in (1.93 m)	170 lb (77 kg)	Jr	Booker T. Washington HS	Pensacola, FL
G	4	Deandre Osuigwe	6 ft 0 in (1.83 m)	170 lb (77 kg)	Sr	Alaska Anchorage	Bradenton, FL
G	5	Keith Littles	6 ft 4 in (1.93 m)	170 lb (77 kg)	Jr	Andrew College	Augusta, GA
F	10	Lenzy Hancock Jr.	6 ft 8 in (2.03 m)	230 lb (104 kg)	Fr	The Rock School	Jacksonville, FL
F	11	Hnric Murray, Jr.	6 ft 5 in (1.96 m)	215 lb (98 kg)	Jr	Potters' House Christian Academy	Orlando, FL
G	13	Jamir Williams	6 ft 5 in (1.96 m)	170 lb (77 kg)	RS Fr	Middle Georgia Prep	Newnan, GA
G	14	Trejan Davis	6 ft 4 in (1.93 m)	208 lb (94 kg)	So	Leon HS	Tallahassee, FL
G	20	Jai Clark	6 ft 2 in (1.88 m)	185 lb (84 kg)	Jr	Indian River State College	Orlando, FL
F	21	Johnny Brown	6 ft 9 in (2.06 m)	210 lb (95 kg)	So	Florida State College	Daytona Beach, FL
C	22	Evins Desir	6 ft 8 in (2.03 m)	300 lb (136 kg)	Sr	Central Georgia Tech	Port-au-Prince, Haiti
F	23	Bryce Moragne	6 ft 5 in (1.96 m)	220 lb (100 kg)	Sr	Hillsborough HS	Tampa, FL
C	24	Wylie Howard	6 ft 11 in (2.11 m)	250 lb (113 kg)	So	Boyd Anderson HS	Lauderhill, FL
F	25	DJ Jones	6 ft 9 in (2.06 m)	200 lb (91 kg)	RS Sr	Tulane	Baton Rouge, LA
F	30	Andrew Dansoh	6 ft 7 in (2.01 m)	200 lb (91 kg)	So	Jesuit Tampa HS	Tampa, FL
F	33	Alex Andrews	6 ft 7 in (2.01 m)	200 lb (91 kg)	Fr	Ocoee High School	Ocoee, FL

Head coach

- Robert McCullum (Birmingham–Southern)

Assistant coach(es)

- Willie Powers (Georgia Southern)
- Jarrett Stephens (LeMoyne–Owen)
- Isaac Brown (Florida A&M)

Legend

- (C) Team captain
- (S) Suspended
- (I) Ineligible
- (W) Walk-on
- Injured
- Current redshirt

Roster
Last update: January 10, 2021

== Schedule and results ==
Date time, TV	Rank^{#}	Opponent^{#}	Result	Record	Site (attendance) city, state
Non-conference regular season
November 25, 2020*; 7:00 pm, ESPN+		at Florida Gulf Coast	L 56–65	0–1	Alico Arena (851); Fort Myers, FL
November 29, 2020*; 2:00 pm, SECN		at Georgia	L 75–85	0–2	Stegeman Coliseum (1,638); Athens, GA
December 4, 2020*; 5:00 pm		at South Florida	Canceled due to COVID-19		Yuengling Center; Tampa, FL
December 6, 2020*; 2:00 pm, BTN		at Nebraska	Canceled due to COVID-19		Pinnacle Bank Arena; Lincoln, NE
December 9, 2020*; 11:00 pm, P12N		at Oregon	L 66–87	0–3	Matthew Knight Arena; Eugene, OR
December 12, 2020*; 5:00 pm		at Oklahoma	L 54–85	0–4	Lloyd Noble Center (1,909); Norman, OK
December 15, 2020*; 8:30 pm, ESPN+		at Austin Peay	W 76–70	1–4	Dunn Center (478); Clarksville, TN
December 18, 2020*; 7:00 pm, ACCNX		at Georgia Tech	L 64–74	1–5	McCamish Pavilion (1,200); Atlanta, GA
December 20, 2020*		at Florida	Canceled due to COVID-19		O'Connell Center; Gainesville, FL
January 2, 2021*; 7:00 pm, SECN		at South Carolina	L 71–78	1–6	Colonial Life Arena (3,100); Columbia, SC
MEAC regular season
January 10, 2021; 2:00 pm		South Carolina State	W 70–68	2–6 (1–0)	Al Lawson Center; Tallahassee, FL
January 11, 2020; 6:00 pm		South Carolina State	Postponed due to COVID-19		Al Lawson Center; Tallahassee, FL
January 30, 2021; 4:00 pm		at North Carolina A&T	L 58–70	2–7 (1–1)	Corbett Sports Center; Greensboro, NC
January 31, 2021; 4:00 pm		at North Carolina A&T	L 65–67	2–8 (1–2)	Corbett Sports Center; Greensboro, NC
February 8, 2021		at North Carolina Central	W 59–50	3–8 (2–2)	McDougald–McLendon Arena; Durham, NC
February 9, 2021		at North Carolina Central	W 60–47	4–8 (3–2)	McDougald–McLendon Arena; Durham, NC
February 20, 2021; 2:00 pm		North Carolina A&T	W 71–57	5–8 (4–2)	Al Lawson Center; Tallahassee, FL
February 22, 2021; 4:00 pm		North Carolina A&T	L 63–70	5–9 (4–3)	Al Lawson Center; Tallahassee, FL
February 25, 2021; 7:00 pm		at South Carolina State	W 75–67	6–9 (5–3)	SHM Memorial Center; Orangeburg, SC
February 27, 2021; 2:00 pm		at South Carolina State	L 57–63	6–10 (5–4)	SHM Memorial Center; Orangeburg, SC
February 28, 2021; 2:00 pm		at South Carolina State	W 63–58	7–10 (6–4)	SHM Memorial Center; Orangeburg, SC
March 3, 2021; 7:00 pm		North Carolina Central	W 65–58	8–10 (7–4)	Al Lawson Center; Tallahassee, FL
March 4, 2021; 7:00 pm		North Carolina Central	L 71–74	8–11 (7–5)	Al Lawson Center; Tallahassee, FL
MEAC tournament
March 11, 2021; 6:00 pm	(S2)	vs. (N3) Morgan State; Quarterfinals	L 75–77	8–12	Norfolk Scope; Norfolk, VA
*Non-conference game. ^{#}Rankings from AP Poll. (#) Tournament seedings in parentheses. All times are in Eastern.
