= 2020–21 Coppin State Eagles men's basketball team =

American college basketball season

2020–21 Coppin State Eagles men's basketball

MEAC North division co-champions
- Conference: Mid-Eastern Athletic Conference
- Northern Division
- Record: 9–13 (8–4 MEAC)
- Head coach: Juan Dixon (4th season)
- Associate head coach: John Auslander
- Assistant coaches: Charles Agumagu; Kevin Braswell
- Home arena: Physical Education Complex

2020–21 MEAC men's basketball standings
| | Conf. | | | | Overall |
| Team | W | | L | PCT | W | | L | PCT |
|---|---|---|---|---|---|---|---|---|
Northern
| Norfolk State † | 8 | – | 4 | .667 | 17 | – | 8 | .680 |
| Coppin State | 8 | – | 4 | .667 | 9 | – | 13 | .409 |
| Morgan State | 7 | – | 5 | .583 | 14 | – | 8 | .636 |
| Delaware State | 1 | – | 11 | .083 | 3 | – | 16 | .158 |
| Howard | 0 | – | 0 | – | 1 | – | 4 | .200 |
Southern
| North Carolina A&T | 7 | – | 1 | .875 | 11 | – | 10 | .524 |
| Florida A&M | 7 | – | 5 | .583 | 8 | – | 12 | .400 |
| North Carolina Central | 3 | – | 5 | .375 | 5 | – | 9 | .357 |
| South Carolina State | 1 | – | 7 | .125 | 1 | – | 17 | .056 |
† 2021 MEAC tournament winner Howard suspended their season on February 9, 2021; Bethune–Cookman and Maryland Eastern Shore did not play the 2020–21 season due to COVID-19 concerns.

The 2020–21 Coppin State Eagles men's basketball team represented Coppin State University in the 2020–21 NCAA Division I men's basketball season. The Eagles, led by fourth-year head coach Juan Dixon, played their home games at the Physical Education Complex in Baltimore, Maryland as members of the Mid-Eastern Athletic Conference. With the creation of divisions to cut down on travel due to the COVID-19 pandemic, they played in the Northern Division.

== Previous season ==
The Eagles finished the 2019–20 season 11–20, 7–9 in MEAC play to finish in seventh place. They were scheduled to play against Norfolk State in the quarterfinals of the MEAC tournament, but the remainder of the tournament was cancelled due to the ongoing COVID-19 pandemic.

== Roster ==
2020–21 Coppin State Eagles men's basketball team
Players
Coaches

| Pos. | # | Name | Height | Weight | Year | Previous school | Hometown |
|---|---|---|---|---|---|---|---|
| G | 0 | Dwaine Jones, Jr. | 6 ft 5 in (1.96 m) | 175 lb (79 kg) | Fr | Neptune High School | Neptune, New Jersey |
| G/F | 1 | Justin Steers | 6 ft 7 in (2.01 m) | 200 lb (91 kg) | Jr | Greater Hope Christian Academy | Philadelphia, Pennsylvania |
| G | 3 | Anthony Tarke | 6 ft 6 in (1.98 m) | 220 lb (100 kg) | RS Sr | UTEP | Gaithersburg, Maryland |
| G | 4 | Nendah Tarke | 6 ft 4 in (1.93 m) | 190 lb (86 kg) | Fr | Bullis School | Gaithersburg, Maryland |
| G | 5 | Reggie James | 6 ft 4 in (1.93 m) | 195 lb (88 kg) | So | Trenton Central High School | Trenton, New Jersey |
| G/F | 10 | Koby Thomas | 6 ft 6 in (1.98 m) | 190 lb (86 kg) | Sr | Robert Morris | Philadelphia, Pennsylvania |
| G | 12 | Kyle Cardaci | 6 ft 2 in (1.88 m) | 190 lb (86 kg) | RS So | Seward County Community College | Holmdel, New Jersey |
| G | 13 | DeJuan Clayton | 6 ft 2 in (1.88 m) | 185 lb (84 kg) | RS Sr | St. John's College High School | Bowie, Maryland |
| F | 14 | Domantas Sakickas | 6 ft 7 in (2.01 m) | 230 lb (104 kg) | Jr | Frederick Community College | Kėdainiai, Lithuania |
| F | 21 | Bryce Hunt | 6 ft 7 in (2.01 m) | 225 lb (102 kg) | Jr | Schoolcraft College | Cincinnati, Ohio |
| F | 22 | Kenan Sarvan | 6 ft 10 in (2.08 m) | 225 lb (102 kg) | RS Fr | Bishop Sullivan Catholic High School | Heeze, Netherlands |
| C | 23 | Yuat Alok | 6 ft 11 in (2.11 m) | 230 lb (104 kg) | RS Jr | Impact Academy (Fla.) | Auckland, New Zealand |
| G | 24 | Kaelon Harkema | 6 ft 2 in (1.88 m) | 180 lb (82 kg) | Fr | Aspire Academy | Louisville, Kentucky |
| G | 25 | Isaiah Gross | 6 ft 4 in (1.93 m) | 210 lb (95 kg) | RS Fr | Eleanor Roosevelt High School | Lanham, Maryland |

Head coach

- Juan Dixon (Maryland)

Assistant coach(es)

- John Auslander (Maryland)
- Charles Agumagu (Barry)
- Kevin Braswell (Georgetown)

Legend

- (C) Team captain
- (S) Suspended
- (I) Ineligible
- (W) Walk-on
- Injured
- Current redshirt

Roster
Last update: January 16, 2021

== Schedule and results ==
| Date time, TV | Rank^{#} | Opponent^{#} | Result | Record | Site (attendance) city, state |
Non-conference regular season
| November 28, 2020*; 2:00 pm, ACCNX | | at No. 9 Duke | L 71–81 | 0–1 | Cameron Indoor Stadium (0); Durham, NC |
| December 5, 2020*; 2:00 pm, ESPN+ | | at George Washington | L 69–85 | 0–2 | Charles E. Smith Center (0); Washington, D.C. |
| December 6, 2020*; 2:00 pm, NBCSPHI/FloHoops | | at Drexel | L 54–69 | 0–3 | Daskalakis Athletic Center (0); Philadelphia, PA |
| December 8, 2020*; 7:00 pm, FS1 | | at Georgetown | L 48–80 | 0–4 | McDonough Arena (0); Washington, D.C. |
| December 10, 2020*; 7:00 pm | | UNC Greensboro | W 86–80 | 1–4 | Physical Education Complex (0); Baltimore, MD |
| December 13, 2020*; 3:00 pm | | UMBC | L 49–66 | 1–5 | Physical Education Complex (0); Baltimore, MD |
| December 19, 2020*; 5:30 pm, ACCNX/MASN | | at Virginia Tech | L 57–97 | 1–6 | Cassell Coliseum (250); Blacksburg, VA |
| December 23, 2020*; 7:00 pm, ESPN+ | | at Iona | L 65–85 | 1–7 | Hynes Athletic Center (0); New Rochelle, NY |
| December 26, 2020*; 2:00 pm, FloHoops | | at Towson | L 73–78 | 1–8 | SECU Arena (0); Towson, MD |
MEAC regular season
| January 4, 2021; 8:00 pm | | Delaware State | W 86–78 | 2–8 (1–0) | Physical Education Complex (0); Baltimore, MD |
| January 5, 2021; 8:00 pm | | Delaware State | W 81–77 | 3–8 (2–0) | Physical Education Complex (0); Baltimore, MD |
| January 16, 2021; 2:00 pm | | at Morgan State | L 72–92 | 3–9 (2–1) | Talmadge L. Hill Field House (0); Baltimore, MD |
| January 17, 2021; 2:00 pm | | at Morgan State | W 89–79 | 4–9 (3–1) | Talmadge L. Hill Field House (0); Baltimore, MD |
| January 23, 2021; 1:00 pm | | Norfolk State | W 81–71 | 5–9 (4–1) | Physical Education Complex (0); Baltimore, MD |
| January 24, 2021; 1:00 pm | | Norfolk State | W 81–77 | 6–9 (5–1) | Physical Education Complex (0); Baltimore, MD |
| January 30, 2021; 3:00 pm, FloHoops | | Morgan State | L 76–79 | 6–10 (5–2) | Physical Education Complex (0); Baltimore, MD |
| January 31, 2021; 3:00 pm | | Morgan State | L 82–95 | 6–11 (5–3) | Physical Education Complex (0); Baltimore, MD |
| February 6, 2021; 2:00 pm | | at Norfolk State | L 72–84 | 6–12 (5–4) | Joseph G. Echols Memorial Hall (174); Norfolk, VA |
| February 7, 2021; 2:00 pm | | at Norfolk State | W 74–64 | 7–12 (6–4) | Joseph G. Echols Memorial Hall (203); Norfolk, VA |
| February 20, 2021 | | at Howard | Canceled | | Burr Gymnasium; Washington, D.C. |
| February 21, 2021 | | at Howard | Canceled | | Burr Gymnasium; Washington, D.C. |
| February 27, 2021; 8:00 pm | | at Delaware State | W 81–68 | 8–12 (7–4) | Memorial Hall; Dover, DE |
| February 28, 2021; 5:00 pm | | at Delaware State | W 94–74 | 9–12 (8–4) | Memorial Hall; Dover, DE |
| March 3, 2021; 7:00 pm, ESPN+ | | Howard | Canceled | | Physical Education Complex; Baltimore, MD |
| March 4, 2021; 7:00 pm, ESPN+ | | Howard | Canceled | | Physical Education Complex; Baltimore, MD |
MEAC tournament
| March 12, 2021; 6:00 pm, Flohoops | (N1) | vs. (N3) Morgan State; Semifinals | L 61–82 | 9–13 | Norfolk Scope; Norfolk, VA |
*Non-conference game. ^{#}Rankings from AP Poll. (#) Tournament seedings in parentheses. All times are in Eastern.
