= 2020–21 Delaware State Hornets men's basketball team =

American college basketball season

2020–21 Delaware State Hornets men's basketball
- Conference: Mid-Eastern Athletic Conference
- Northern Division
- Record: 3–16 (1–11 MEAC)
- Head coach: Eric Skeeters (3rd season)
- Assistant coaches: Keith Goodie; Kevin McClain; Stephen Stewart
- Home arena: Memorial Hall

2020–21 MEAC men's basketball standings
	Conf.				Overall
Team	W		L	PCT	W		L	PCT
Northern
Norfolk State †	8	–	4	.667	17	–	8	.680
Coppin State	8	–	4	.667	9	–	13	.409
Morgan State	7	–	5	.583	14	–	8	.636
Delaware State	1	–	11	.083	3	–	16	.158
Howard	0	–	0	–	1	–	4	.200
Southern
North Carolina A&T	7	–	1	.875	11	–	10	.524
Florida A&M	7	–	5	.583	8	–	12	.400
North Carolina Central	3	–	5	.375	5	–	9	.357
South Carolina State	1	–	7	.125	1	–	17	.056
† 2021 MEAC tournament winner Howard suspended their season on February 9, 2021; Bethune–Cookman and Maryland Eastern Shore did not play the 2020–21 season due to COVID-19 concerns.

The 2020–21 Delaware State Hornets men's basketball team represented Delaware State University in the 2020–21 NCAA Division I men's basketball season. The Hornets, led by third-year head coach Eric Skeeters, played their home games at Memorial Hall in Dover, Delaware as members of the Mid-Eastern Athletic Conference (MEAC). With the creation of divisions to cut down on travel due to the COVID-19 pandemic, they played in the Northern division. They finished the season 3–16, 1–11 in MEAC play, to finish in fourth place in the Northern division. They failed to qualify for the MEAC tournament.

On April 1, 2021, the school fired Skeeters after three seasons at Delaware State. On June 3, the school named high school coach Stan Waterman the team's new head coach.

== Previous season ==
The Hornets finished the 2019–20 season 6–26, 4–12 in MEAC play, to finish in a tie for ninth place. As the No. 8 seed in the MEAC tournament, they beat Maryland Eastern Shore in the first round, before losing to North Carolina Central in the quarterfinals.

== Roster ==
2020–21 Delaware State Hornets men's basketball team
Players
Coaches

Pos.	#	Name	Height	Weight	Year	Previous school	Hometown
F	1	D'Marco Baucum	6 ft 6 in (1.98 m)	225 lb (102 kg)	RS So	St. Frances Academy	Washington, D.C.
G/F	2	Omari Peek-Green	6 ft 6 in (1.98 m)	210 lb (95 kg)	So	Dohn Community High School	Cincinnati, OH
G	3	Martez Robinson	6 ft 2 in (1.88 m)	190 lb (86 kg)	Fr	New Town High School	Owings Mills, MD
PG	4	Pinky Wiley	5 ft 11 in (1.8 m)	175 lb (79 kg)	Jr	Chesterfield High School (VA)	Chesterfield, VA
G	5	John Stansbury	6 ft 3 in (1.91 m)	195 lb (88 kg)	So	Hodgson Vo-Tech High School	New Castle, DE
F	10	Ronald Lucas	6 ft 6 in (1.98 m)	190 lb (86 kg)	So	The Reach! Partnership School	Baltimore, MD
SG	12	Dominik Fragala	6 ft 0 in (1.83 m)	160 lb (73 kg)	RS Jr	Niagara	Chantilly, VA
F	13	Fahim Jenneto	6 ft 7 in (2.01 m)	230 lb (104 kg)	So	Thornlea Secondary School	Ajax, ON
F	15	Ameer Bennett	6 ft 8 in (2.03 m)	220 lb (100 kg)	Jr	St. Christopher's School	Richmond, VA
C	21	Chris Sodom	7 ft 3 in (2.21 m)	230 lb (104 kg)	So	Georgetown	Washington, D.C.
SG	23	Shaft Clark	6 ft 4 in (1.93 m)	—	Fr	Caesar Rodney High School	Dover, DE
F/C	24	Zach Kent	6 ft 10 in (2.08 m)	230 lb (104 kg)	So	Tennessee	Magnolia, DE
G	32	Myles Carter	6 ft 1 in (1.85 m)	170 lb (77 kg)	Sr	Palumbo High School	Philadelphia, PA
F	50	Christopher Smith	6 ft 8 in (2.03 m)	220 lb (100 kg)	Fr	Riverdale Baptist School	Upper Marlboro, MD

Head coach

- Eric Skeeters (Coppin State)

Assistant coach(es)

- Keith Goodie (Morgan State)
- Kevin McClain (America)
- Stephen Stewart (Coppin State)

Legend

- (C) Team captain
- (S) Suspended
- (I) Ineligible
- (W) Walk-on
- Injured
- Current redshirt

Roster
Last update: January 11, 2021

== Schedule and results ==
Date time, TV	Rank^{#}	Opponent^{#}	Result	Record	Site (attendance) city, state
Regular season
November 25, 2020*; 4:00 p.m., ACCNX		at Wake Forest; Mako Medical Wake Forest Classic	L 51–111	0–1	LJVM Coliseum; Winston-Salem, NC
November 26, 2020*; 12:00 p.m.		vs. Longwood; Mako Medical Wake Forest Classic	Canceled due to COVID-19		LJVM Coliseum; Winston-Salem, NC
December 17, 2020*; 6:00 p.m., ESPN+		at Coastal Carolina	L 73–99	0–2	HTC Center (53); Conway, SC
December 20, 2020*; 6:00 p.m., ACCN		at Georgia Tech	L 69–97	0–3	McCamish Pavilion (1,200); Atlanta, GA
December 23, 2020*; 12:00 p.m.		at UNC Wilmington	L 63–87	0–4	Trask Coliseum (25); Wilmington, NC
December 30, 2020*; 1:00 p.m.		Manhattan	L 59–65	0–5	Memorial Hall; Dover, DE
January 4, 2021; 8:00 p.m.		at Coppin State	L 78–86	0–6 (0–1)	Physical Education Complex; Baltimore, MD
January 5, 2021; 8:00 p.m.		at Coppin State	L 77–81	0–7 (0–2)	Physical Education Complex; Baltimore, MD
January 9, 2021; 2:00 p.m., ESPN+		at Howard	Canceled due to COVID-19		Burr Gymnasium; Washington, D.C.
January 10, 2021; 2:00 p.m., ESPN+		at Howard	Canceled due to COVID-19		Burr Gymnasium; Washington, D.C.
January 16, 2021; 5:00 p.m.		Norfolk State	L 76–87	0–8 (0–3)	Memorial Hall; Dover, DE
January 17, 2021; 5:00 p.m.		Norfolk State	L 79–83 ^{OT}	0–9 (0–4)	Memorial Hall; Dover, DE
January 24, 2021; 2:00 p.m.		at Morgan State	L 83–99	0–10 (0–5)	Talmadge L. Hill Field House; Baltimore, MD
January 30, 2021; 4:30 p.m.		at Norfolk State	L 66–94	0–11 (0–6)	Joseph G. Echols Memorial Hall (207); Norfolk, VA
January 31, 2021; 4:30 p.m.		at Norfolk State	Postponed due to COVID-19		Joseph G. Echols Memorial Hall; Norfolk, VA
February 3, 2021*; 3:30 p.m.		Lancaster Bible	W 81–80	1–11	Memorial Hall; Dover, DE
February 6, 2021; 2:00 p.m.		at Morgan State	L 69–74	1–12 (0–7)	Talmadge L. Hill Field House; Baltimore, MD
February 12, 2021*; 2:00 p.m.		Cairn	Canceled due to COVID-19		Memorial Hall; Dover, DE
February 13, 2021; 1:00 p.m.		Howard	Canceled due to COVID-19		Memorial Hall; Dover, DE
February 14, 2021; 1:00 p.m.		Howard	Canceled due to COVID-19		Memorial Hall; Dover, DE
February 20, 2021; 1:00 p.m.		Morgan State	Postponed due to COVID-19		Memorial Hall; Dover, DE
February 21, 2021; 1:00 p.m.		Morgan State	Postponed due to COVID-19		Memorial Hall; Dover, DE
February 21, 2021*; 1:00 p.m.		St. Mary's (MD)	W 75–58	2–12	Memorial Hall; Dover, DE
February 24, 2021; 6:00 p.m.		at Norfolk State	L 55–86	2–13 (0–8)	Joseph G. Echols Memorial Hall (215); Norfolk, VA
February 27, 2021; 8:00 p.m.		Coppin State	L 68–81	2–14 (0–9)	Memorial Hall; Dover, DE
February 28, 2021; 5:00 p.m.		Coppin State	L 74–94	2–15 (0–10)	Memorial Hall; Dover, DE
March 5, 2021; 1:00 p.m.		Morgan State	L 67–92	2–16 (0–11)	Memorial Hall; Dover, DE
March 6, 2021; 5:00 p.m.		Morgan State	W 82–75	3–16 (1–11)	Memorial Hall; Dover, DE
*Non-conference game. ^{#}Rankings from AP poll. (#) Tournament seedings in parentheses. All times are in Eastern.
