= 2020–21 North Carolina A&T Aggies men's basketball team =

American college basketball season

2020–21 North Carolina A&T Aggies men's basketball

MEAC regular season and South division champions
- Conference: Mid-Eastern Athletic Conference
- Record: 11–10 (7–1 MEAC)
- Head coach: Willie Jones (1st season)
- Assistant coaches: Ahmad Dorsett; Phillip Shumpert; Sam Hunt
- Home arena: Corbett Sports Center

2020–21 MEAC men's basketball standings
	Conf.				Overall
Team	W		L	PCT	W		L	PCT
Northern
Norfolk State †	8	–	4	.667	17	–	8	.680
Coppin State	8	–	4	.667	9	–	13	.409
Morgan State	7	–	5	.583	14	–	8	.636
Delaware State	1	–	11	.083	3	–	16	.158
Howard	0	–	0	–	1	–	4	.200
Southern
North Carolina A&T	7	–	1	.875	11	–	10	.524
Florida A&M	7	–	5	.583	8	–	12	.400
North Carolina Central	3	–	5	.375	5	–	9	.357
South Carolina State	1	–	7	.125	1	–	17	.056
† 2021 MEAC tournament winner Howard suspended their season on February 9, 2021; Bethune–Cookman and Maryland Eastern Shore did not play the 2020–21 season due to COVID-19 concerns.

The 2020–21 North Carolina A&T Aggies men's basketball team represented North Carolina Agricultural and Technical State University in the 2020–21 NCAA Division I men's basketball season. The Aggies, led by first-year head coach Willie Jones, played their home games at the Corbett Sports Center in Greensboro, North Carolina as members of the Mid-Eastern Athletic Conference.

== Roster ==
2020–21 North Carolina A&T Aggies men's basketball team
Players
Coaches

Pos.	#	Name	Height	Weight	Year	Hometown
G	0	Darus Maddox	6 ft 0 in (1.83 m)	150 lb (68 kg)	Sr	Lusby, Maryland
F	1	Jeremy Robinson	6 ft 5 in (1.96 m)	215 lb (98 kg)	So	Raleigh, North Carolina
G	2	Fred Cleveland, Jr.	5 ft 10 in (1.78 m)	160 lb (73 kg)	So	Chicago, Illinois
F	3	Tyler Jones	6 ft 8 in (2.03 m)	225 lb (102 kg)	GS	Atlantic City, New Jersey
F	4	Quentin Jones	6 ft 8 in (2.03 m)	235 lb (107 kg)	Jr	Columbus, Ohio
G	5	Milton Matthews	6 ft 3 in (1.91 m)	185 lb (84 kg)	Fr	District Heights, Maryland
G	10	Justin Brooks	6 ft 1 in (1.85 m)	185 lb (84 kg)	Fr	Auburn, Alabama
G	11	Tyler Maye	6 ft 1 in (1.85 m)	175 lb (79 kg)	Sr	Farmville, North Carolina
G	12	Kwe Parker	6 ft 2 in (1.88 m)	180 lb (82 kg)	RS Sr	Fayetteville, North Carolina
G	13	Kameron Langley	6 ft 2 in (1.88 m)	165 lb (75 kg)	Sr	High Point, North Carolina
C	14	Harry Morrice	6 ft 11 in (2.11 m)	235 lb (107 kg)	So	Dundee, Scotland
G	21	Kenyon Duling	6 ft 2 in (1.88 m)	205 lb (93 kg)	Jr	Chicago, Illinois
G	22	Trey Crews	6 ft 1 in (1.85 m)	150 lb (68 kg)	RS Fr	Durham, North Carolina
G	23	Ahmad Hamilton	6 ft 2 in (1.88 m)	170 lb (77 kg)	RS Fr	Durham, North Carolina
G	24	Jibril McCormick	6 ft 7 in (2.01 m)	180 lb (82 kg)	So	Charlotte, North Carolina
F	25	Webster Filmore	6 ft 7 in (2.01 m)	225 lb (102 kg)	Jr	Charlotte, North Carolina
C	33	Dadid Greer	7 ft 0 in (2.13 m)	235 lb (107 kg)	Jr	Ocean Springs, Mississippi
G/F	35	Tyrone Lyons	6 ft 7 in (2.01 m)	185 lb (84 kg)	Jr	Amityville, New York
G	55	Blake Harris	6 ft 3 in (1.91 m)	190 lb (86 kg)	Jr	Chapel Hill, North Carolina

Head coach

- Willie Jones (South Carolina State)

Assistant coach(es)

- Ahmad Dorsett (George Mason)
- Phillip Shumpert (United States Sports Academy)
- Sam Hunt (NC State)

Legend

- (C) Team captain
- (S) Suspended
- (I) Ineligible
- (W) Walk-on
- Injured
- Current redshirt

Roster
Last update: January 21, 2021

== Schedule and results ==
Date time, TV	Rank^{#}	Opponent^{#}	Result	Record	High points	High rebounds	High assists	Site (attendance) city, state
Regular season
November 25, 2020*; 2:00 pm, BTN		at No. 8 Illinois; Illinois MTE	L 60–122	0–1	12 – Harris	4 – Cleveland	4 – Langley	State Farm Center (132); Champaign, IL
November 26, 2020*; 2:30 pm		vs. Ohio; Illinois MTE	L 72–84	0–2	13 – Morrice	7 – Lyons	8 – Langley	State Farm Center (143); Champaign, IL
November 27, 2020*; 3:00 pm		vs. Chicago State; Illinois MTE	W 74–44	1–2	14 – Tied	9 – Langley	11 – Langley	State Farm Center (155); Champaign, IL
December 1, 2020*; 7:00 pm		at Charleston Southern	W 70–63	2–2	14 – Lyons	9 – Langley	11 – Langley	Buccaneer Field House (32); North Charleston, SC
December 3, 2020*; 7:00 pm		at The Citadel	L 70–78	2–3	12 – Tied	10 – Langley	7 – Langley	McAlister Field House (500); Charleston, SC
December 6, 2020*; 2:00 pm		Stanford	L 46–78	2–4	10 – Morrice	8 – Langley	5 – Langley	Corbett Sports Center (0); Greensboro, NC
December 8, 2020*; 6:00 pm		at Longwood	L 60–77	2–5	16 – Tied	5 – Robinson	4 – Langley	Willett Hall (0); Farmville, VA
December 9, 2020*; 7:00 pm, ESPN+		at VCU	L 59–95	2–6	13 – Lyons	5 – Morrice	3 – Langley	Siegel Center (250); Richmond, VA
December 12, 2020*; 4:00 pm, CBSSN+		Western Carolina	L 98–104 ^{OT}	2–7	27 – Jones	9 – Langley	16 – Langley	Corbett Sports Center (0); Greensboro, NC
December 18, 2020*; 3:00 pm, fuboTV		Greensboro College	W 91–45	3–7	16 – T. Jones	9 – Lyons	6 – Harris	Corbett Sports Center (0); Greensboro, NC
December 19, 2020*; 4:00 p.m., YouTube		at Charlotte	L 72–76	3–8	19 – Q. Jones	4 – Robinson	5 – Harris	Halton Arena (58); Charlotte, NC
December 22, 2020*; 6:00 p.m., ESPN+		UNC Greensboro; Battle of Market Street	L 65–86	3–9	12 – Langley	8 – Tied	9 – Langley	Corbett Sports Center (0); Greensboro, NC
January 2, 2021; 2:00 p.m.		at South Carolina State	W 97–86	4–9 (1–0)	20 – Maye	6 – Lyons	9 – Langley	SHM Memorial Center (150); Orangeburg, SC
January 3, 2021; 4:00 p.m.		at South Carolina State	W 73–66	5–9 (2–0)	17 – Harris	7 – Lyons	4 – Langley	SHM Memorial Center (150); Orangeburg, SC
January 16, 2021*; 4:00 p.m.		Carver	W 112–46	6–9	17 – Harris	7 – Lyons	4 – Langley	Corbett Sports Center; Greensboro, NC
January 23, 2021; 4:00 p.m.		at NC Central; NC Central rivalry	Postponed due to COVID-19 issues					McDougald–McLendon Arena; Durham, NC
January 24, 2021; 4:00 p.m.		at NC Central; NC Central rivalry	Postponed due to COVID-19 issues					McDougald–McLendon Arena; Durham, NC
January 30, 2021; 2:00 p.m., NCATTV		Florida A&M	W 70–58	7–9 (3–0)	15 – Langley	11 – Lyons	10 – Langley	Corbett Sports Center (0); Greensboro, NC
January 31, 2021; 4:00 p.m., NCATTV		Florida A&M	W 67–65	8–9 (4–0)	13 – Langley	10 – Langley	5 – Lyons	Corbett Sports Center (0); Greensboro, NC
February 20, 2021; 2:00 p.m.		at Florida A&M	L 57–71	8–10 (4–1)	9 – Tied	6 – Tied	3 – Langley	Al Lawson Center (71); Tallahassee, FL
February 21, 2021; 4:00 p.m.		at Florida A&M	W 70–63	9–10 (5–1)	14 – Maye	8 – Filmore	4 – Langley	Al Lawson Center (65); Tallahassee, FL
February 24, 2021; 5:00 p.m.		at NC Central	W 79–63	10–10 (6–1)	15 – Tied	14 – Filmore	9 – Langley	McDougald–McLendon Arena (75); Durham, NC
February 27, 2021; 8:00 p.m.		NC Central	W 55–53	11–10 (7–1)	12 – Tied	9 – Langley	4 – Parker	Corbett Sports Center (0); Greensboro, NC
March 3, 2021; 6:00 p.m.		South Carolina State	Canceled due to COVID-19 issues					Corbett Sports Center; Greensboro, NC
March 4, 2021; 6:00 p.m.		South Carolina State	Canceled due to COVID-19 issues					Corbett Sports Center; Greensboro, NC
MEAC tournament
March 12, 2021; 8:00 p.m., FloHoops	(S1)	vs. (N2) Norfolk State; Semifinals	Canceled due to COVID-19 issues (Note: North Carolina A&T reported a positive COVID test on Thursday, March 11. As a result, the game between Norfolk State and North Carolina A&T was canceled, and Norfolk State advanced directly to the tournament finals.)					Norfolk Scope; Norfolk, VA
*Non-conference game. ^{#}Rankings from AP Poll. (#) Tournament seedings in parentheses. All times are in Eastern.
