= 2020–21 North Carolina Central Eagles men's basketball team =

American college basketball season

2020–21 North Carolina Central Eagles men's basketball
- Conference: Mid-Eastern Athletic Conference
- Southern Division
- Record: 5–9 (3–5 MEAC)
- Head coach: LeVelle Moton (12th season)
- Assistant coaches: Brian Graves; Reggie Sharp; Nigel Thomas
- Home arena: McDougald–McLendon Arena

2020–21 MEAC men's basketball standings
	Conf.				Overall
Team	W		L	PCT	W		L	PCT
Northern
Norfolk State †	8	–	4	.667	17	–	8	.680
Coppin State	8	–	4	.667	9	–	13	.409
Morgan State	7	–	5	.583	14	–	8	.636
Delaware State	1	–	11	.083	3	–	16	.158
Howard	0	–	0	–	1	–	4	.200
Southern
North Carolina A&T	7	–	1	.875	11	–	10	.524
Florida A&M	7	–	5	.583	8	–	12	.400
North Carolina Central	3	–	5	.375	5	–	9	.357
South Carolina State	1	–	7	.125	1	–	17	.056
† 2021 MEAC tournament winner Howard suspended their season on February 9, 2021; Bethune–Cookman and Maryland Eastern Shore did not play the 2020–21 season due to COVID-19 concerns.

The 2020–21 North Carolina Central Eagles men's basketball team represented North Carolina Central University in the 2020–21 NCAA Division I men's basketball season. The Eagles, led by 12th-year head coach LeVelle Moton, played their home games at McDougald–McLendon Arena in Durham, North Carolina as members of the Mid-Eastern Athletic Conference. With the creation of divisions to cut down on travel due to the COVID-19 pandemic, they played in the Southern Division.

== Previous season ==
The Eagles finished the 2019–20 season 18–13, 13–3 in MEAC play to finish as MEAC regular season champions. They defeated Delaware State in the quarterfinals of the MEAC tournament. They were scheduled to play the winner of the quarterfinal matchup between Bethune–Cookman and Morgan State in the semifinals, but the remainder of the tournament was cancelled due to the ongoing COVID-19 pandemic.

== Roster ==
2020–21 North Carolina Central Eagles men's basketball team
Players
Coaches

Pos.	#	Name	Height	Weight	Year	Previous school	Hometown
G	0	Jamir Moultrie	5 ft 11 in (1.8 m)	180 lb (82 kg)	RS Jr	La Salle	Washington, D.C.
G	1	Mike Melvin	5 ft 11 in (1.8 m)	160 lb (73 kg)	Sr	Brunswick CC	Fayetteville, NC
G	2	Justin Wright	6 ft 1 in (1.85 m)	210 lb (95 kg)	Fr	Farmville Central HS	Greenville, NC
G	3	Ty Graves	5 ft 10 in (1.78 m)	160 lb (73 kg)	RS Sr	Saint Louis	Greensboro, NC
G	5	Deven Palmer	6 ft 4 in (1.93 m)	185 lb (84 kg)	Sr	Tallahassee CC	Hyde Park, MA
F	11	Cameron Bowles	6 ft 6 in (1.98 m)	190 lb (86 kg)	RS Jr	Chicago State	Chicago, IL
G	12	Jordan Perkins	6 ft 1 in (1.85 m)	190 lb (86 kg)	Sr	Greensboro Day School	Greensboro, NC
F/C	13	Justin Whatley	6 ft 8 in (2.03 m)	240 lb (109 kg)	RS Jr	East Carolina	Chesapeake, VA
F	21	Kobby Ayetey	6 ft 6 in (1.98 m)	210 lb (95 kg)	Sr	Baltimore City CC	Accra, Ghana
G	22	C.J. Keyser	6 ft 3 in (1.91 m)	190 lb (86 kg)	RS Sr	Wichita State	Baltimore, MD
F	23	Jahnathan Maxwell	6 ft 6 in (1.98 m)	250 lb (113 kg)	RS Sr	Iona	Virginia Beach, VA
G	24	Nicolas Fennell	6 ft 4 in (1.93 m)	160 lb (73 kg)	RS Jr	Archbishop Carroll HS	Bowie, MD
F	25	Nehemie Kabeya	6 ft 9 in (2.06 m)	235 lb (107 kg)	Jr	College of Southern Idaho	Ngaliema, DR Congo

Head coach

- LeVelle Moton (North Carolina Central)

Assistant coach(es)

- Brian Graves (Catawba)
- Reggie Sharp (Auburn)
- Nigel Thomas (Langston)

Legend

- (C) Team captain
- (S) Suspended
- (I) Ineligible
- (W) Walk-on
- Injured
- Current redshirt

Roster
Last update: January 9, 2021

== Schedule and results ==
Date time, TV	Rank^{#}	Opponent^{#}	Result	Record	Site (attendance) city, state
Regular season
November 25, 2020*; 4:00 pm, BTN		at No. 5 Iowa	L 67–97	0–1	Carver–Hawkeye Arena (535); Iowa City, IA
November 26, 2020*; 7:00 pm		vs. Southern	W 85–78 ^{OT}	1–1	Carver–Hawkeye Arena (227); Iowa City, IA
December 3, 2020*; 6:00 pm		at Wofford	Canceled due to COVID-19		Jerry Richardson Indoor Stadium; Spartanburg, SC
December 5, 2020*; 6:00 pm, ESPN+		at USC Upstate	Canceled due to COVID-19		G. B. Hodge Center; Spartanburg, SC
December 7, 2020*; 6:00 pm, ESPN+		at Coastal Carolina	L 71–78	1–2	HTC Center; Conway, SC
December 11, 2020*; 8:00 pm, SECN+		at Vanderbilt	Canceled due to COVID-19		Memorial Gymnasium; Nashville, TN
December 12, 2020*; 2:00 pm, RSN		at No. 16 North Carolina	L 67–73	1–3	Dean Smith Center; Chapel Hill, NC
December 15, 2020*; 7:00 pm, NCCU Sports Network		Charleston Southern	Canceled due to COVID-19		McDougald–McLendon Arena; Durham, NC
January 9, 2021; TBA		at Florida A&M	Postponed		Al Lawson Center; Tallahassee, FL
January 10, 2021; TBA		at Florida A&M	Postponed		Al Lawson Center; Tallahassee, FL
January 23, 2021; 12:00 pm, ESPNU		North Carolina A&T	Postponed		McDougald–McLendon Arena; Durham, NC
January 24, 2020; 2:00 pm, ESPN+		North Carolina A&T	Postponed		McDougald–McLendon Arena; Durham, NC
January 29, 2020*; 4:00 pm, ESPN+		Carver	W 94–61	2–3	McDougald–McLendon Arena (15); Durham, NC
February 1, 2021; 9:00 pm, ESPN2		South Carolina State	W 91–77	3–3 (1–0)	McDougald–McLendon Arena (15); Durham, NC
February 2, 2021; 7:00 pm, ESPN+		South Carolina State	W 64–63	4–3 (2–0)	McDougald–McLendon Arena (15); Durham, NC
February 6, 2021; 2:00 pm, ESPN+		Florida A&M	L 50–59	4–4 (2–1)	McDougald–McLendon Arena; Durham, NC
February 7, 2021; 2:00 pm, ESPN+		Florida A&M	L 47–60	4–5 (2–2)	McDougald–McLendon Arena; Durham, NC
February 20, 2021; TBA		at South Carolina State	Postponed		SHM Memorial Center; Orangeburg, SC
February 21, 2021; TBA		at South Carolina State	Postponed		SHM Memorial Center; Orangeburg, SC
February 27, 2021; 4:00 pm		at North Carolina A&T	L 53–69	4–6 (2–3)	Corbett Sports Center; Greensboro, NC
February 28, 2021; 7:00 pm		at North Carolina A&T	L 53–55	4–7 (2–4)	Corbett Sports Center; Greensboro, NC
March 3, 2021; 6:00 pm, ESPN+		Florida A&M	L 58–65	4–8 (2–5)	McDougald–McLendon Arena; Durham, NC
February 7, 2021; 6:00 pm, ESPN+		Florida A&M	W 74–71	5–8 (3–5)	McDougald–McLendon Arena; Durham, NC
MEAC tournament
March 7, 2021; 8:00 pm, FloHoops	(S3)	vs. (N2) Norfolk State; First round	L 58–87	5–9	Norfolk Scope; Norfolk, VA
*Non-conference game. ^{#}Rankings from AP Poll. (#) Tournament seedings in parentheses. All times are in Central.
