= 2020–21 Howard Bison men's basketball team =

American college basketball season

2020–21 Howard Bison men's basketball
- Conference: Mid-Eastern Athletic Conference
- Northern Division
- Record: 1–4 (0–0 MEAC)
- Head coach: Kenny Blakeney (2nd season)
- Assistant coaches: Jake Brown; Tyler Thornton
- Home arena: Burr Gymnasium

2020–21 MEAC men's basketball standings
	Conf.				Overall
Team	W		L	PCT	W		L	PCT
Northern
Norfolk State †	8	–	4	.667	17	–	8	.680
Coppin State	8	–	4	.667	9	–	13	.409
Morgan State	7	–	5	.583	14	–	8	.636
Delaware State	1	–	11	.083	3	–	16	.158
Howard	0	–	0	–	1	–	4	.200
Southern
North Carolina A&T	7	–	1	.875	11	–	10	.524
Florida A&M	7	–	5	.583	8	–	12	.400
North Carolina Central	3	–	5	.375	5	–	9	.357
South Carolina State	1	–	7	.125	1	–	17	.056
† 2021 MEAC tournament winner Howard suspended their season on February 9, 2021; Bethune–Cookman and Maryland Eastern Shore did not play the 2020–21 season due to COVID-19 concerns.

The 2020–21 Howard Bison men's basketball team represented Howard University in the 2020–21 NCAA Division I men's basketball season. The Bison, led by second-year head coach Kenny Blakeney, played their home games at Burr Gymnasium in Washington, D.C. as members of the Mid-Eastern Athletic Conference (MEAC). With the creation of divisions to cut down on travel due to the COVID-19 pandemic, they played in the Northern Division. They finished the season 1–4, 0–0 in MEAC play, before suspending their season on February 9, 2021, due to an abundance of positive cases amongst their players amid the COVID-19 pandemic.

== Previous season ==
The Bison finished the 2019–20 season 4–29, 1–15 in MEAC play, to finish in last place. They defeated South Carolina State in the first round of the MEAC tournament, before losing to North Carolina A&T in the quarterfinals.

== Roster ==
2020–21 Howard Bison men's basketball team
Players
Coaches

Pos.	#	Name	Height	Weight	Year	Previous school	Hometown
G	0	Khalil Robinson	6 ft 0 in (1.83 m)	160 lb (73 kg)	So	Gray Collegiate Academy	Columbia, SC
G	1	Rahim Jr. Ali	5 ft 11 in (1.8 m)	150 lb (68 kg)	Fr	Baltimore Poly	Baltimore, MD
F	2	Steve III Settle	6 ft 10 in (2.08 m)	175 lb (79 kg)	RS Fr	DeMatha Catholic High School	Glenarden, MD
F	4	Makur Maker	6 ft 11 in (2.11 m)	235 lb (107 kg)	Fr	Hillcrest Prep (AZ)	Melbourne, Australia
F	5	Sam Green	6 ft 6 in (1.98 m)	230 lb (104 kg)	GS	Drexel	Bowie, MD
G	10	Deven Richmond	6 ft 4 in (1.93 m)	190 lb (86 kg)	Jr	Howard Community College	Bowie, MD
G	11	Kyle Foster	6 ft 5 in (1.96 m)	172 lb (78 kg)	Sr	Bethel High School	Hampton, VA
G	13	Thomas Weaver	5 ft 10 in (1.78 m)	165 lb (75 kg)	Fr	Riverdale Baptist School	Upper Marlboro, MD
G	14	Spencer Hayes	6 ft 5 in (1.96 m)	175 lb (79 kg)	Fr	St. Andrew's Episcopal School	Upper Marlboro, MD
G	15	Isaac Suffren	6 ft 4 in (1.93 m)	190 lb (86 kg)	So	Lafayette	Charlotte, NC
F	21	Christian Johnson	6 ft 7 in (2.01 m)	190 lb (86 kg)	Fr	Ron Brown High School	Washington, D.C.
C	22	Cam Timmons	6 ft 11 in (2.11 m)	295 lb (134 kg)	RS Fr	Highland School	Warrenton, VA
F	24	Jordan Wood	6 ft 9 in (2.06 m)	200 lb (91 kg)	Fr	Cornerstone Christian (TX)	San Antonio, TX
G	31	Wayne Jr. Bristol	6 ft 6 in (1.98 m)	185 lb (84 kg)	So	St. Thomas More School	Upper Marlboro, MD
C	32	Liwayne Richardson	6 ft 10 in (2.08 m)	250 lb (113 kg)	So	Westlake Academy	Boca Raton, FL

Head coach

- Kenny Blakeney (Duke)

Assistant coach(es)

- Jake Brown (Middlebury)
- Tyler Thornton (Duke)

Legend

- (C) Team captain
- (S) Suspended
- (I) Ineligible
- (W) Walk-on
- Injured
- Current redshirt

Roster
Last update: January 26, 2021

== Schedule and results ==
Date time, TV	Rank^{#}	Opponent^{#}	Result	Record	Site (attendance) city, state
Regular season
November 25, 2020*; 5:00 p.m., ESPN3		vs. Belmont; Paradise Jam	L 78–95	0–1	Walter E. Washington Convention Center; Washington, D.C.
November 27, 2020*; 5:00 p.m., ESPN3		vs. Queens (NC); Paradise Jam	L 71–85	0–2	Walter E. Washington Convention Center; Washington, D.C.
November 28, 2020*; 3:00 p.m., ESPN3		vs. George Mason; Paradise Jam	L 70–84	0–3	Walter E. Washington Convention Center; Washington, D.C.
December 2, 2020*; 4:00 p.m.		La Salle	Canceled		Burr Gymnasium; Washington, D.C.
December 6, 2020*; 6:00 p.m., ESPN+		Bellarmine; Mako Medical Duke Classic	L 63–84	0–4	Burr Gymnasium; Washington, D.C.
December 8, 2020*; 6:30 p.m.		Elon; Mako Medical Duke Classic	Canceled		Burr Gymnasium; Washington, D.C.
December 18, 2020*; 5:00 p.m., ESPN+		Hampton	W 81–76	1–4	Burr Gymnasium; Washington, D.C.
December 22, 2020*; 1:00 p.m.		at Mount St. Mary's	Canceled		Knott Arena; Emmitsburg, MD
January 9, 2021; 2:00 p.m.		Delaware State	Postponed		Burr Gymnasium; Washington, D.C.
January 10, 2021; 2:00 p.m.		Delaware State	Postponed		Burr Gymnasium; Washington, D.C.
January 18, 2021*; 2:30 p.m.		Notre Dame	Canceled		Burr Gymnasium; Washington, D.C.
January 23, 2021; 2:00 p.m.		at Morgan State	Postponed		Talmadge L. Hill Field House; Baltimore, MD
January 24, 2021; 2:00 p.m.		at Morgan State	Postponed		Talmadge L. Hill Field House; Baltimore, MD
February 1, 2021; 9:00 p.m., ESPN2		North Carolina Central	Canceled		Burr Gymnasium; Washington, D.C.
February 7, 2021; TBD		Morgan State	Canceled		Burr Gymnasium; Washington, D.C.
February 8, 2021; 7:00 p.m., ESPNU		Morgan State	Canceled		Burr Gymnasium; Washington, D.C.
February 13, 2021; TBA		at Delaware State	Canceled		Memorial Hall; Dover, DE
February 14, 2021; TBA		at Delaware State	Canceled		Memorial Hall; Dover, DE
February 17, 2021; 7:00 p.m.		at Norfolk State	Canceled		Joseph G. Echols Memorial Hall; Norfolk, VA
February 18, 2021; 7:00 p.m.		at Norfolk State	Canceled		Joseph G. Echols Memorial Hall; Norfolk, VA
February 21, 2021; TBA		Coppin State	Canceled		Burr Gymnasium; Washington, D.C.
February 22, 2021; TBA		Coppin State	Canceled		Burr Gymnasium; Washington, D.C.
February 27, 2021; TBA		Norfolk State	Canceled		Burr Gymnasium; Washington, D.C.
February 28, 2021; TBA		Norfolk State	Canceled		Burr Gymnasium; Washington, D.C.
March 3, 2021; TBA		at Coppin State	Canceled		Physical Education Complex; Baltimore, MD
March 4, 2021; TBA		at Coppin State	Canceled		Physical Education Complex; Baltimore, MD
MEAC tournament
March 10–13, 2021		vs.	Did not compete		Norfolk Scope; Norfolk, VA
*Non-conference game. ^{#}Rankings from AP poll. (#) Tournament seedings in parentheses. All times are in Central.
