= 2021 MEAC men's basketball tournament =

US collegiate basketball tournament

- Classification: Division I
- Season: 2020–21
- Teams: 6
- Site: Norfolk Scope; Norfolk, Virginia
- Champions: Norfolk State (2nd title)
- Winning coach: Robert Jones (1st title)
- MVP: Joe Bryant Jr. (Norfolk State)
- Television: FloHoops, ESPN2

2020–21 MEAC men's basketball standings
	Conf.				Overall
Team	W		L	PCT	W		L	PCT
Northern
Norfolk State †	8	–	4	.667	17	–	8	.680
Coppin State	8	–	4	.667	9	–	13	.409
Morgan State	7	–	5	.583	14	–	8	.636
Delaware State	1	–	11	.083	3	–	16	.158
Howard	0	–	0	–	1	–	4	.200
Southern
North Carolina A&T	7	–	1	.875	11	–	10	.524
Florida A&M	7	–	5	.583	8	–	12	.400
North Carolina Central	3	–	5	.375	5	–	9	.357
South Carolina State	1	–	7	.125	1	–	17	.056
Howard suspended their season on February 9, 2021; Bethune–Cookman and Maryland Eastern Shore did not play the 2020–21 season due to COVID-19 concerns.
† 2021 MEAC tournament winner

The 2021 MEAC men's basketball tournament was the postseason men's basketball tournament for the 2020–21 season in the Mid-Eastern Athletic Conference (MEAC). The tournament took place from March 11–13, 2021. The tournament winner received an automatic invitation to the 2021 NCAA Division I men's basketball tournament.

== Seeds ==
In a deviation from the format used in previous years, the 2021 edition of the tournament seeded teams using their divisional placement, rather than their finish in the conference as a whole.

Division	Seed	School	Conference	Tiebreaker
Northern	N1	Coppin State	8–4	3–1 vs. Norfolk State
Northern	N2	Norfolk State	8–4	1–3 vs. Coppin State
Northern	N3	Morgan State	7–5	
Southern	S1	North Carolina A&T	7–1	
Southern	S2	Florida A&M	7–5	
Southern	S3	North Carolina Central	3–5	

== Schedule ==
Game	Time*	Matchup^{#}	Score	Television
Quarterfinals – Thursday, March 11, 2021
1	6:00 p.m.	(N3) Morgan State vs. (S2) Florida A&M	77–75	FloHoops
2	8:00 p.m.	(S3) North Carolina Central vs. (N2) Norfolk State	58–87	FloHoops
Semifinals – Friday, March 12, 2021
3	6:00 p.m.	(N3) Morgan State vs. (N1) Coppin State	82–61	FloHoops
4	8:00 p.m.	(N2) Norfolk State vs. (S1) North Carolina A&T	Cancelled (Note: North Carolina A&T reported a positive COVID test on Thursday, March 11. As a result, the game between Norfolk State and North Carolina A&T was cancelled, and Norfolk State advanced directly to the tournament finals.)	FloHoops
Championship – Saturday, March 13, 2021
5	1:00 p.m.	(N3) Morgan State vs. (N2) Norfolk State	63–71	ESPN2
*Game times in EST. #-Rankings denote tournament seeding.

== Bracket ==
Quarterfinals; Thursday, March 11; FloHoops
S2	Florida A&M	75
N3	Morgan State	77
N2	Norfolk State	87
S3	NC Central	58

Semifinals; Friday, March 12; FloHoops
N1	Coppin State	61
N3	Morgan State	82
S1	~~North Carolina A&T~~
N2	Norfolk State

Championship; Saturday, March 13; ESPN2
N3	Morgan State	63
N2	Norfolk State	71
