= 2020–21 South Carolina State Bulldogs basketball team =

American college basketball season

2020–21 South Carolina State Bulldogs basketball
- Conference: Mid-Eastern Athletic Conference
- Southern Division
- Record: 1–17 (1–7 MEAC)
- Head coach: Murray Garvin (8th season)
- Associate head coach: Rio Pitt
- Assistant coaches: Ed Stephens; Joe Flegler
- Home arena: SHM Memorial Center

2020–21 MEAC men's basketball standings
	Conf.				Overall
Team	W		L	PCT	W		L	PCT
Northern
Norfolk State †	8	–	4	.667	17	–	8	.680
Coppin State	8	–	4	.667	9	–	13	.409
Morgan State	7	–	5	.583	14	–	8	.636
Delaware State	1	–	11	.083	3	–	16	.158
Howard	0	–	0	–	1	–	4	.200
Southern
North Carolina A&T	7	–	1	.875	11	–	10	.524
Florida A&M	7	–	5	.583	8	–	12	.400
North Carolina Central	3	–	5	.375	5	–	9	.357
South Carolina State	1	–	7	.125	1	–	17	.056
† 2021 MEAC tournament winner Howard suspended their season on February 9, 2021; Bethune–Cookman and Maryland Eastern Shore did not play the 2020–21 season due to COVID-19 concerns.

The 2020–21 South Carolina State Bulldogs basketball team represented South Carolina State University in the 2020–21 NCAA Division I men's basketball season. The Bulldogs, led by eighth-year head coach Murray Garvin, played their home games at SHM Memorial Center in Orangeburg, South Carolina as members of the Mid-Eastern Athletic Conference. With the creation of divisions to cut down on travel due to the COVID-19 pandemic, they played in the Southern Division.

== Previous season ==
The Bulldogs finished the 2019–20 season 11–18, 6–10 in MEAC play to finish in eighth place. They lost in the first round of the MEAC tournament to Howard.

== Roster ==
2020–21 South Carolina State Bulldogs men's basketball team
Players
Coaches

Pos.	#	Name	Height	Weight	Year	Previous school	Hometown
G	0	Themus Fulks	6 ft 1 in (1.85 m)	185 lb (84 kg)	Fr	North Davidson HS	Winston-Salem, NC
G	1	Tariq Simmons	6 ft 2 in (1.88 m)	185 lb (84 kg)	Sr	Panola College	Columbia, SC
F	2	Jemal Davis	6 ft 9 in (2.06 m)	200 lb (91 kg)	Fr	Liberty Heights Athletic Institute	Charlotte Amalie, USVI
F	3	Quamain Nelson	6 ft 6 in (1.98 m)	210 lb (95 kg)	Jr	John A. Logan College	Great Falls, SC
G/F	4	Latavian Lawrence	6 ft 6 in (1.98 m)	210 lb (95 kg)	Fr	Gray Collegiate Academy	New Ellenton, SC
G	5	Isaiah Felder	6 ft 0 in (1.83 m)	190 lb (86 kg)	GS	Savannah State	Orangeburg, SC
G	10	Rahsaan Edwards	6 ft 0 in (1.83 m)	200 lb (91 kg)	So	St. Maria Goretti HS	Charles Town, WV
F	11	Majok Madol	6 ft 10 in (2.08 m)	225 lb (102 kg)	Jr	Frank Phillips College	Regina, Saskatchewan
G/F	12	Omar Croskey	6 ft 5 in (1.96 m)	200 lb (91 kg)	So	Sumter HS	Sumter, SC
G	13	Rashamel Bulter	6 ft 4 in (1.93 m)	195 lb (88 kg)	So	Monroe CC	Ridgeland, SC
G	14	Floyd Rideau, Jr.	6 ft 5 in (1.96 m)	190 lb (86 kg)	Fr	Boyd H. Anderson HS	Lake Wales, FL
G	15	Trushaun Moorer	6 ft 3 in (1.91 m)	190 lb (86 kg)	Sr	Clinton College	Summerville, SC
G	23	Jadakiss Wright	6 ft 0 in (1.83 m)	195 lb (88 kg)	Fr	Silver Bluff HS	Beech Island, SC
F	35	Sebastian Guitian	6 ft 10 in (2.08 m)	240 lb (109 kg)	So	Florida SW State College	Miami, FL
C	42	Dallas James	7 ft 0 in (2.13 m)	235 lb (107 kg)	Fr	City Honors Prep Academy	Artesia, CA
G	55	Brandynn Manning	6 ft 3 in (1.91 m)	205 lb (93 kg)	Jr	Merritt College	Pittsburg, CA

Head coach

- Murray Garvin (Eastern Kentucky)

Assistant coach(es)

- Rio Pitt (South Carolina State)
- Ed Stephens (South Carolina State)
- Joe Flegler (Savannah State)

Legend

- (C) Team captain
- (S) Suspended
- (I) Ineligible
- (W) Walk-on
- Injured
- Current redshirt

Roster
Last update: January 2, 2021

== Schedule and results ==
Date time, TV	Rank^{#}	Opponent^{#}	Result	Record	Site (attendance) city, state
Non-conference regular season
November 25, 2020*; 2:00 pm		Appalachian State	L 61–81	0–1	SHM Memorial Center (150); Orangeburg, SC
November 28, 2020*; 12:00 pm, ESPN3		at Bowling Green	L 78–101	0–2	Stroh Center (300); Bowling Green, OH
December 2, 2020*; 6:00 pm, ACCN		at Clemson	L 38–75	0–3	Littlejohn Coliseum (1,345); Clemson, SC
December 5, 2020*; 2:00 pm, ESPN+		at UNC Asheville	L 56–77	0–4	Kimmel Arena (0); Asheville, NC
December 7, 2020*; 6:00 pm		at Charlotte	L 40–78	0–5	Dale F. Halton Arena (60); Charlotte, NC
December 11, 2020*; 7:00 pm		at College of Charleston	L 63–90	0–6	TD Arena; Charleston, SC
December 13, 2020*; 2:00 pm		Jacksonville	L 58–60	0–7	SHM Memorial Center (150); Orangeburg, SC
December 15, 2020*; 7:00 pm, ESPN+		at Liberty	L 52–82	0–8	Liberty Arena (250); Lynchburg, VA
December 18, 2020*; 6:00 pm, ESPN+		at Presbyterian	L 56–62	0–9	Templeton Physical Education Center (15); Clinton, SC
December 21, 2020*; 4:00 pm, ESPN+		at Furman	L 52–118	0–10	Timmons Arena (250); Greenville, SC
December 23, 2020*; 7:00 pm		at South Carolina	Cancelled due to COVID-19		Colonial Life Arena; Columbia, SC
MEAC regular season
January 2, 2021; 2:00 pm		North Carolina A&T	L 86–97	0–11 (0–1)	SHM Memorial Center (150); Orangeburg, SC
January 3, 2021; 4:00 pm		North Carolina A&T	L 66–73	0–12 (0–2)	SHM Memorial Center (150); Orangeburg, SC
January 10, 2021; 2:00 pm		at Florida A&M	L 68–70	0–13 (0–3)	Al Lawson Center (150); Tallahassee, FL
February 1, 2021; 9:00 pm, ESPN2		at North Carolina Central	L 77–91	0–14 (0–4)	McDougald–McLendon Arena (15); Durham, NC
February 2, 2021; 7:00 pm, ESPN+		at North Carolina Central	L 63–64	0–15 (0–5)	McDougald–McLendon Arena (15); Durham, NC
February 6, 2021; 4:00 pm		at North Carolina A&T	Postponed		Corbett Sports Center; Greensboro, NC
February 7, 2021; 4:00 pm		at North Carolina A&T	Postponed		Corbett Sports Center; Greensboro, NC
February 20, 2021; 6:00 pm		North Carolina Central	Postponed		SHM Memorial Center; Orangeburg, SC
February 21, 2021; TBA		North Carolina Central	Postponed		SHM Memorial Center; Orangeburg, SC
February 25, 2021; 7:00 pm		Florida A&M	L 67–75	0–16 (0–6)	SHM Memorial Center; Orangeburg, SC
February 27, 2021; 6:00 pm		Florida A&M	W 63–57	1–16 (1–6)	SHM Memorial Center; Orangeburg, SC
February 28, 2021; 6:00 pm		Florida A&M	L 58–63	1–17 (1–7)	SHM Memorial Center; Orangeburg, SC
*Non-conference game. ^{#}Rankings from AP Poll. (#) Tournament seedings in parentheses. All times are in Eastern.
