= 2020–21 Norfolk State Spartans men's basketball team =

American college basketball season

2020–21 Norfolk State Spartans men's basketball
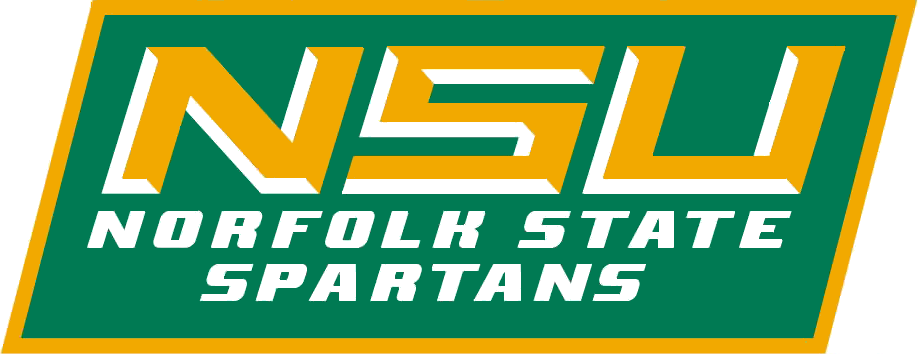

MEAC North Division and tournament champions

NCAA tournament, First round
- Conference: Mid-Eastern Athletic Conference
- Northern Division
- Record: 17–8 (8–4 MEAC)
- Head coach: Robert Jones (8th season)
- Assistant coaches: Jamal Brown; C.J. Clemons; Leonard Fairley
- Home arena: Joseph G. Echols Memorial Hall

2020–21 MEAC men's basketball standings
	Conf.				Overall
Team	W		L	PCT	W		L	PCT
Northern
Norfolk State †	8	–	4	.667	17	–	8	.680
Coppin State	8	–	4	.667	9	–	13	.409
Morgan State	7	–	5	.583	14	–	8	.636
Delaware State	1	–	11	.083	3	–	16	.158
Howard	0	–	0	–	1	–	4	.200
Southern
North Carolina A&T	7	–	1	.875	11	–	10	.524
Florida A&M	7	–	5	.583	8	–	12	.400
North Carolina Central	3	–	5	.375	5	–	9	.357
South Carolina State	1	–	7	.125	1	–	17	.056
† 2021 MEAC tournament winner Howard suspended their season on February 9, 2021; Bethune–Cookman and Maryland Eastern Shore did not play the 2020–21 season due to COVID-19 concerns.

The 2020–21 Norfolk State Spartans men's basketball team represented Norfolk State University in the 2020–21 NCAA Division I men's basketball season. The Spartans, led by eighth-year head coach Robert Jones, played their home games at the Joseph G. Echols Memorial Hall in Norfolk, Virginia as members of the Mid-Eastern Athletic Conference. With the creation of divisions to cut down on travel due to the ongoing COVID-19 pandemic, they played in the Northern division. They finished the season 17–8, 8–4 in MEAC play to finish in tie for first place in the Northern division. They defeated North Carolina Central in the quarterfinals of the MEAC tournament and advanced to the championship when North Carolina A&T withdrew from the tournament due to COVID-19 protocols. They defeated Morgan State to win the tournament championship. As a result, they received the conference's automatic bid to the NCAA tournament as a No. 16 seed in the West region. They defeated Appalachian State in the First Four, but were eliminated by No. 1 overall seed Gonzaga in the first round.

== Previous season ==
The Spartans finished the 2019–20 season 16–15, 12–4 in MEAC play to finish in a tie for second place. They were scheduled to play Coppin State in the quarterfinals of the MEAC tournament, but the remainder of the tournament was canceled due to the ongoing COVID-19 pandemic.

== Roster ==
2020–21 Norfolk State Spartans men's basketball team
Players
Coaches

Pos.	#	Name	Height	Weight	Year	Previous school	Hometown
F	1	Nyzaiah Chambers	6 ft 7 in (2.01 m)	230 lb (104 kg)	So	Hillcrest Prep (AZ)	Chesapeake, Virginia
G/F	2	Kashaun Hicks	6 ft 6 in (1.98 m)	230 lb (104 kg)	RS Sr	Central Connecticut	Harlem, New York
G	3	Mustafa Lawrence	6 ft 0 in (1.83 m)	185 lb (84 kg)	Sr	Fresno State	Newark, New Jersey
G	4	Joe Bryant Jr.	6 ft 1 in (1.85 m)	225 lb (102 kg)	Jr	Lake Taylor High School	Norfolk, Virginia
G/F	5	Tyrese Jenkins	6 ft 6 in (1.98 m)	200 lb (91 kg)	So	Varina High School	Richmond, Virginia
G	13	Daryl Anderson	6 ft 6 in (1.98 m)	180 lb (82 kg)	So	Miller School of Albemarle	North Chesterfield, Virginia
G	14	Devante Carter	6 ft 3 in (1.91 m)	210 lb (95 kg)	Sr	Odessa College	Newport News, Virginia
F	15	J.J. Matthews	6 ft 9 in (2.06 m)	250 lb (113 kg)	RS Sr	Arkansas State	Richmond, Virginia
G	22	Andre Bottoms	6 ft 0 in (1.83 m)	185 lb (84 kg)	Fr	Oscar Smith High School	Chesapeake, Virginia
F/C	23	Efstratios Kalogerias	6 ft 10 in (2.08 m)	250 lb (113 kg)	Sr	Hillsborough Community College	Piraeus, Greece
G	24	Jalen Hawkins	6 ft 2 in (1.88 m)	170 lb (77 kg)	RS Jr	Robert Morris	Bronx, New York
F	32	Chris Ford	6 ft 8 in (2.03 m)	180 lb (82 kg)	Jr	L. C. Bird High School	Chesterfield, Virginia
G/F	35	Yoro Sidibe	6 ft 7 in (2.01 m)	220 lb (100 kg)	So	Long Island Lutheran High School	Dakar, Senegal
G	55	Kyonze Chavis	6 ft 4 in (1.93 m)	195 lb (88 kg)	RS Sr	Colby Community College	Chesapeake, Virginia

Head coach

- Robert Jones (SUNY New Paltz)

Assistant coach(es)

- Jamal Brown (South Carolina State)
- C.J. Clemons (Norfolk State)
- Leonard Fairley (Norfolk State)

Legend

- (C) Team captain
- (S) Suspended
- (I) Ineligible
- (W) Walk-on
- Injured
- Current redshirt

Roster
Last update: January 7, 2021

== Schedule and results ==
Date time, TV	Rank^{#}	Opponent^{#}	Result	Record	Site (attendance) city, state
Regular season
November 27, 2020*; 12:00 pm, FloHoops		at James Madison	W 83–73	1–0	Atlantic Union Bank Center (250); Harrisonburg, VA
November 28, 2020*; 7:00 pm		vs. Radford	W 57–54	2–0	Atlantic Union Bank Center (150); Harrisonburg, VA
December 2, 2020*; 8:00 pm, WGNT		Old Dominion; Scope Series	L 66–80	2–1	Joseph G. Echols Memorial Hall (250); Norfolk, VA
December 7, 2020*; 7:00 pm		Hampton	W 76–64	3–1	Joseph G. Echols Memorial Hall; Norfolk, VA
December 9, 2020*; 7:00 pm		William & Mary	Postponed		Joseph G. Echols Memorial Hall; Norfolk, VA
December 13, 2020*; 2:00 pm, ESPN+		at UNC Greensboro	L 47–64	3–2	Greensboro Coliseum; Greensboro, NC
December 15, 2020*; 7:00 pm		Regent	Postponed		Joseph G. Echols Memorial Hall; Norfolk, VA
December 18, 2020*; 4:00 pm		UNC Wilmington	L 72–80	3–3	Joseph G. Echols Memorial Hall (110); Norfolk, VA
December 26, 2020*; 4:00 pm, ESPN+		at George Mason	W 68–65	4–3	EagleBank Arena (202); Fairfax, VA
January 9, 2021; 2:00 pm, FloHoops		Morgan State	L 74–78	4–4 (0–1)	Joseph G. Echols Memorial Hall (110); Norfolk, VA
January 10, 2021; 2:00 pm, FloHoops		Morgan State	W 89–85	5–4 (1–1)	Joseph G. Echols Memorial Hall (137); Norfolk, VA
January 13, 2021*; 4:00 pm		North Carolina Wesleyan	W 80–58	6–4	Joseph G. Echols Memorial Hall (130); Norfolk, VA
January 16, 2021; 5:00 pm		at Delaware State	W 87–76	7–4 (2–1)	Memorial Hall; Dover, DE
January 17, 2021; 5:00 pm		at Delaware State	W 83–79 ^{OT}	8–4 (3–1)	Memorial Hall; Dover, DE
January 23, 2021; 1:00 pm		at Coppin State	L 71–81	8–5 (3–2)	Physical Education Complex; Baltimore, MD
January 24, 2021; 1:00 pm		at Coppin State	L 77–81	8–6 (3–3)	Physical Education Complex; Baltimore, MD
January 30, 2021; 4:30 pm		Delaware State	W 94–66	9–6 (4–3)	Joseph G. Echols Memorial Hall; Norfolk, VA
February 7, 2021; 2:00 pm		Coppin State	W 84–72	10–6 (5–3)	Joseph G. Echols Memorial Hall; Norfolk, VA
February 8, 2021; 2:00 pm		Coppin State	L 64–74	10–7 (5–4)	Joseph G. Echols Memorial Hall; Norfolk, VA
February 13, 2021; 2:00 pm, FloHoops		at Morgan State	W 74–69	11–7 (6–4)	Talmadge L. Hill Field House; Baltimore, MD
February 14, 2021; 2:00 pm, FloHoops		at Morgan State	W 68–65	12–7 (7–4)	Talmadge L. Hill Field House; Baltimore, MD
February 17, 2021; 7:00 pm		Howard	Canceled due to COVID-19		Joseph G. Echols Memorial Hall; Norfolk, VA
February 18, 2021; 7:00 pm		Howard	Canceled due to COVID-19		Joseph G. Echols Memorial Hall; Norfolk, VA
February 24, 2021; 7:00 pm		Delaware State	W 86–55	13–7 (8–4)	Joseph G. Echols Memorial Hall; Norfolk, VA
February 27, 2021; TBA		at Howard	Canceled due to COVID-19		Burr Gymnasium; Washington, D.C.
February 27, 2021; TBA, ESPN+		at Howard	Canceled due to COVID-19		Burr Gymnasium (0); Washington, D.C.
February 28, 2021; 2:00 pm		St. Mary's College	W 72–51	14–7	Joseph G. Echols Memorial Hall (0); Norfolk, VA
MEAC tournament
March 11, 2021; 8:00 pm, FloHoops	(N2)	vs. (S3) North Carolina Central; Quarterfinals	W 87–58	15–7	Norfolk Scope (0); Norfolk, VA
March 12, 2021; 8:00 pm, FloHoops	(N2)	vs. (S1) North Carolina A&T; Semifinals	Advanced by forfeit due to positive COVID-19 test at North Carolina A&T		Norfolk Scope (0); Norfolk, VA
March 13, 2021; 1:00 pm, ESPN2	(N2)	vs. (N3) Morgan State; Championship	W 71–63	16–7	Norfolk Scope (0); Norfolk, VA
NCAA tournament
March 18, 2021; 8:40 pm, truTV	(16 W)	vs. (16 W) Appalachian State; First Four	W 54–53	17–7	Simon Skjodt Assembly Hall (3,444); Bloomington, IN
March 20, 2021; 9:20 pm, TBS	(16 W)	vs. (1 W) No. 1 Gonzaga; First Round	L 55–98	17–8	Bankers Life Fieldhouse; Indianapolis, IN
*Non-conference game. ^{#}Rankings from AP Poll. (#) Tournament seedings in parentheses. W=West. All times are in Eastern.
