= Robert McCullum =

American basketball coach (born 1954)

Biographical details
- Born: June 20, 1954 (age 72); Birmingham, Alabama, U.S.
- Education: Birmingham–Southern College ('76)

Playing career
- 1972–1974: Seminole Junior College

Coaching career (HC unless noted)
- 1976–1978: Council Junior HS
- 1978–1982: Ramsay HS (assistant)
- 1983: South Alabama (assistant)
- 1984: Samford (assistant)
- 1985–1987: South Alabama (assistant)
- 1988–1989: Southern Illinois (assistant)
- 1990: Kansas State (assistant)
- 1991–1996: Florida (assistant)
- 1996–2000: Illinois (assistant)
- 2000–2003: Western Michigan
- 2003–2007: South Florida
- 2007–2008: San Francisco (assistant)
- 2009–2010: UCF (assistant)
- 2010–2011: Georgia Tech (assistant)
- 2011–2012: Guangzhou Long-Lions (assistant)
- 2014–2017: Oregon (assistant)
- 2017–2024: Florida A&M

Head coaching record
- Overall: 151–254 (.373) (college)
- Tournaments: 0–1 (NIT)

Accomplishments and honors

Awards
- MEAC Coach of the Year (2021)

Robert L. McCullum (born June 20, 1954) is an American men's college basketball coach who was most recently the head men's basketball coach at Florida A&M. He previously served as the head coach of the Western Michigan Broncos men's basketball team and the University of South Florida (USF) Bulls men's basketball team. He is a native of Birmingham, Alabama.

== Coaching career ==
McCullum got his start in coaching in the high school ranks before taking his first college coaching job at South Alabama in 1983. After a one-year stint with the Jaguars, McCullum moved on to Samford for the 1984 season before returning to South Alabama, where he stayed as an assistant until 1987. He then joined the staff at Southern Illinois from 1988 to 1989 before becoming an assistant coach under Lon Kruger at Kansas State in 1990. McCullum followed Kruger to Florida where he was an assistant from 1991 to 1996, and once more worked under Kruger at Illinois from 1996 to 2000.

In 2000, McCullum was named the head coach at Western Michigan where he compiled a 44–45 record in three seasons, including a berth in the 2003 NIT.

McCullum was hired as the head men's basketball coach at South Florida on April 18, 2003, by athletic director Lee Roy Selmon. In four seasons, McCullum was 40–76, and was fired after the 2006–07 season on March 9, 2007.

After South Florida, McCullum coached the Nigerian men's national basketball team where he led the team to a 4–1 record at the All-Africa Games. Following his coaching with Nigeria, McCullum joined the staff at San Francisco for one season before moving on to be an assistant coach at UCF under Kirk Speraw.

In 2010, McCullum became an assistant coach for the Georgia Tech men's basketball team under head coach Paul Hewitt. After Hewitt was fired, McCullum was not retained and became an assistant for the Guangzhou Long-Lions of the Chinese Basketball Association before joining Dana Altman's staff at Oregon as an assistant coach.

McCullum was named head coach at Florida A&M on May 16, 2017.

== Head coaching record ==
=== College ===
Record table
Season	Team	Overall	Conference	Standing	Postseason
Western Michigan Broncos (Mid-American Conference) (2000–2003)
2000–01	Western Michigan	7–21	7–11	4th (West)	
2001–02	Western Michigan	17–13	10–8	3rd (West)	
2002–03	Western Michigan	20–11	10–8	3rd (West)	NIT First Round
Western Michigan:		44–45 (.494)	27–27 (.500)		
South Florida Bulls (Conference USA) (2003–2005)
2003–04	South Florida	7–20	1–15	14th	
2004–05	South Florida	14–16	5–11	11th	
South Florida Bulls (Big East Conference) (2005–2007)
2005–06	South Florida	7–22	1–15	16th	
2006–07	South Florida	12–18	3–13	14th	
South Florida:		40–76 (.345)	10–54 (.156)		
Florida A&M Rattlers (Mid-Eastern Athletic Conference) (2017–2021)
2017–18	Florida A&M	9–25	7–9	T–7th	
2018–19	Florida A&M	12–19	9–7	T–4th	
2019–20	Florida A&M	12–15	10–6	T–4th	
2020–21	Florida A&M	8–12	7–5	5th	
Florida A&M Rattlers (Southwestern Athletic Conference) (2021–2024)
2021–22	Florida A&M	13–17	11–7	4th	
2022–23	Florida A&M	7–22	5–13	11th	
2023–24	Florida A&M	6–23	4–14	11th	
Florida A&M:		67–133 (.335)	53–61 (.465)		
Total:		151–254 (.373)			
