= Murray Garvin =

Biographical details
- Education: Eastern Kentucky

Coaching career (HC unless noted)
- 1998–2001: Tates Creek HS (asst.)
- 2001–2005: Clinton Junior College
- 2004–2008: Charleston Southern (asst.)
- 2008–2010: Winston-Salem State (asst.)
- 2010–2013: South Carolina State (asst.)
- 2013–2021: South Carolina State

Head coaching record
- Overall: 82–168 (.328)
- Tournaments: CIT: 0–1

Accomplishments and honors

Awards
- MEAC Coach of the Year (2016)

Murray Garvin is an American college basketball coach, formerly the head coach for South Carolina State University. He became head coach when previous head coach Tim Carter resigned midway through the 2012–2013 season.

== Head coaching record ==
Record table
Season	Team	Overall	Conference	Standing	Postseason
South Carolina State Bulldogs (MEAC) (2013–2021)
2012–13	South Carolina State	2–7	2–6	12th	
2013–14	South Carolina State	9–21	5–11	8th	
2014–15	South Carolina State	11–22	7–9	T–7th	
2015–16	South Carolina State	19–15	12–4	T–2nd	CIT First Round
2016–17	South Carolina State	11–20	7–9	T–7th	
2017–18	South Carolina State	10–22	6–10	10th	
2018–19	South Carolina State	8–26	5–11	T–10th	
2019–20	South Carolina State	11–18	6–10	8th	
2020–21	South Carolina State	1–17	1–7	4th (Northern)	
South Carolina State:		82–168 (.328)	51–77 (.400)		
Total:		82–168 (.328)			
National champion Postseason invitational champion Conference regular season champion Conference regular season and conference tournament champion Division regular season champion Division regular season and conference tournament champion Conference tournament champion
