= Mighty Barrolle BC =

Mighty Barrolle
- History: Mighty Barrolle Basketball Club (1956–present)
- Location: Monrovia, Liberia
- Head coach: Assad Fedel

Mighty Barrolle Basketball Club is a Liberian basketball team based in Monrovia. The team is associated with the football team with the same name. They play in the LBA Division 1 (LBA) and have won the national championship four times, including in 2016, 2022, 2023 and 2024.

Mighty Barrolle will make its debut in the Road to BAL in 2024.

== Honours ==
LBA Division 1

- Champions (4): 2016, 2022, 2023, 2024

== Roster ==
The following was Mighty Barrolle's roster in the 2025 BAL qualification:Note: Flags indicate national team, as has been defined under FIBA eligibility rules. Players may hold more than one non-FIBA nationality.

No.	Pos.	Nat.	Player
5		(Liberia) LBR	Omar Samba
6		(Liberia) LBR	Abraham Petors
7		(Liberia) LBR	Brian Nyangbe
8		(Liberia) LBR	John Williams Jr.
9		(Nigeria) NGA	Chibuzo Njoku
10		(Liberia) LBR	John Davids
11		(Liberia) LBR	Sam Haider
12		(Liberia) LBR	Agnew Dorley Jr.
13		(Liberia) LBR	Jonathan Nagbe
14		(Liberia) LBR	Anthony Quadri
15		(Liberia) LBR	James Bedeah
16		(Liberia) LBR	Sackie Fahn Jr.
