= Liberia Basketball Association =

- Country: Liberia
- Confederation: FIBA Africa
- Divisions: First Division; Second Division; Third Division
- Number of teams: 61 (1st: 11, 2nd: 20, 3rd: 30)
- Level on pyramid: 1–3
- International cup: Basketball Africa League (BAL)
- Current champions: 1st Division: NPA Pythons (3rd title); 2nd Division: Highway Kings; 3rd Division: Bushrod Dreams (2024)

The Liberia Basketball Association (LBA) is a men's professional basketball league in Liberia. The is divided up into three divisions, with the First Division being the top league in the country.

The champions of the First Division are eligible to play in the qualifying rounds of the Basketball Africa League (BAL).

== Current clubs ==
=== Division One (9 teams) ===
Team	Coach
Barnesville Dragons	
Bushrod Bulls	Richmond Tobii
Cestos Mogars	Zayzay Gizzie
Commissioners	
Desert Knights	
Invincible Eleven	
LPRC Oilers	Varfley Corneh
Mighty Barrolle	Assad Fadel
NPA Pythons	

=== Division Two (15 teams) ===
Team	Coach
Bong Eagles	
Bushrod Ballers	
G-High Landers	
Georgia Warriors	
Global Spartans	
Highway Kings	
KA-Rockets	
Kardinal	
King George Knights	(Liberia) Eddie Philips
Royal Legends	
Sac Base	
Spartacus	
Storm Troopers	
TS Warriors	(Liberia) Ernest Bestman
Vision Shooters	(Liberia) Claudius Thompson

== Past champions ==
Season	Champion	Finalist	Ref.
2007	NPA Pythons		
2010	Uhuru Kings		
2011	LPRC Oilers		
2012	LPRC Oilers	Uhuru Kings	
2013	LPRC Oilers		
2016	Mighty Barrolle		
2017	LPRC Oilers	Mighty Barrolle	
2018	LPRC Oilers	Harbel Pointers	
2019	NPA Pythons	Harbel Pointers	
2022	Mighty Barrolle	LPRC Oilers	
2023	Mighty Barrolle		
2024	Mighty Barrolle	Cestos Mogars	
2025	LPRC Oilers (Note: In the 2025 finals, the NPA Pythons forfeited Game 3 of the finals, which led to the LBA declaring the LPRC Oilers as champions.)	NPA Pythons	
2026	NPA Pythons	LPRC Oilers	

=== Titles by club ===
Club	Champions	Years won
LPRC Oilers	6	2011, 2012, 2013, 2017, 2018, 2025
Mighty Barrolle	4	2016, 2022, 2023, 2024
NPA Pythons	3	2007, 2019, 2026
Uhuru Kings	1	2010

== In the Basketball Africa League ==
The champions of the Liberia Basketball Association First Division are invited to the qualifying tournament for the Basketball Africa League (BAL). Two teams, namely NPA Pythons and Mighty Barrolle, have represented the country in the BAL thus far.

Season	Representative	Road to BAL				Main competition		
Season	Representative	W	L	Result	Qualified	W	L	Result
2021	NPA Pythons	1	3	3rd in West Division Group B, First Round	No	Did not qualify		
2022	Not invited							
2023	Not invited							
2024	Not invited							
2025	Mighty Barrolle	2	4	3rd in West Division Group B, Elite 16	No	Did not qualify		
2026	LPRC Oilers	0	3	3rd in West Division Group B, First Round	No	Did not qualify		
Total		3	10			-	-	
