= Bethune–Cookman Wildcats men's basketball =

2026–27 Bethune–Cookman Wildcats men's basketball team
- University: Bethune–Cookman University
- First season: 1929–1930
- Athletic director: Reggie Theus
- Head coach: Reggie Theus (6th season)
- Location: Daytona Beach, Florida
- Arena: Moore Gymnasium (capacity: 3,000)
- Conference: SWAC
- Nickname: Wildcats
- Colors: Maroon and gold

NCAA Division I tournament second round
- 1965*, 1968*, 1980*

NCAA Division I tournament appearances
- 1965*, 1968*, 1980*

Conference tournament champions
- SIAC: 1953, 1968, 1980

Conference regular-season champions
- 2011, 2018, 2026
- * at Division II level

The Bethune–Cookman Wildcats men's basketball team represents Bethune–Cookman University in the sport of basketball. The Wildcats compete in the NCAA Division I and the Southwestern Athletic Conference (SWAC). They play their home games in Moore Gymnasium on campus in Daytona Beach, Florida. They are coached by former NBA player and Sacramento Kings coach Reggie Theus. The team has been playing since 1930, having joined Division I along with the rest of the conference in 1980.

The Wildcats are one of 34 eligible Division I programs to have never appeared in the NCAA Division I men's basketball tournament. They are the only SWAC team to never reach the tournament and one of just two (with Florida A&M) to never win the SWAC tournament.

== Team history ==
=== Pre-Division I (1930–1979) ===
For the first 50 years of their program, the Bethune–Cookman Wildcats men's basketball team competed in the NCAA Division II. During this era, it had eight different coaches. The most notable coach from this era was former Bethune–Cookman and Pittsburgh Steelers player Jack "Cy" McClairen. Some accomplishments during this era include qualifying for the NIBT tournament twice, the NAIA tournament once, and the NCAA Division II tournament three times. All of these post-season runs ended in defeat for Bethune–Cookman.

=== Division I era (1980–present) ===
After competing in NCAA Division II for 50 years, the team was invited to play in the NCAA Division I. In 2021, Bethune–Cookman accepted an invitation to join the Southwestern Athletic Conference (SWAC). Originally, the team played in the Mid-Eastern Athletic Conference (MEAC). During this time, the only tournament the Wildcats have made is the NIT tournament. Though they now play in the NCAA Division I, they have never made a tournament appearance.

=== Results by season in Division I (1980–2025) ===
Season	Coach	Overall	Conference	Standings	Postseason
1980–1981	Cy McClairen	13–15	6–8	4th	–
1981–1982	Cy McClairen	11–17	5–7	6th	–
1982–1983	Cy McClairen	5–21	3–9	7th	–
1983–1984	Cy McClairen	6–22	2–10	6th	–
1984–1985	Cy McClairen	8–19	4–12	5th	–
1985–1986	Cy McClairen	7–22	4–12	7th	–
1986–1987	Cy McClairen	10–19	6–8	7th	–
1987–1988	Cy McClairen	6–21	4–10	–	–
1988–1989	Cy McClairen	12–16	8–8	5th	–
1989–1990	Cy McClairen	10–18	8–8	4th	–
1990–1991	Cy McClairen	5–24	3–13	9th	–
1991–1992	Cy McClairen	4–25	3–13	8th	–
1992–1993	Cy McClairen	2–25	2–14	9th	–
1993–1994	Tony Sheals	9–18	8–8	5th	–
1994–1995	Tony Sheals	12–16	9–7	4th	–
1995–1996	Tony Sheals	12–15	8–8	4th	–
1996–1997	Tony Sheals	12–16	9–9	4th	–
1997–1998	Horace Broadnax	1–26	1–17	10th	–
1998–1999	Horace Broadnax	11–16	10–9	5th	–
1999–2000	Horace Broadnax	14–15	12–6	4th	–
2000–2001	Horace Broadnax	10–19	5–13	9th	–
2001–2002	Clifford Reed Jr. (6–4) Horace Broadnax (6–13)	12–17	8–10	8th	–
2002–2003	Clifford Reed Jr.	8–22	5–13	T–9th	–
2003–2004	Clifford Reed Jr.	8–21	7–11	8th	–
2004–2005	Clifford Reed Jr.	13–17	6–12	9th	–
2005–2006	Clifford Reed Jr.	15–15	11–7	3rd	–
2006–2007	Clifford Reed Jr.	9–21	6–12	9th	–
2007–2008	Clifford Reed Jr.	11–21	5–11	9th	–
2008–2009	Clifford Reed Jr.	17–16	9–7	3rd	–
2009–2010	Clifford Reed Jr.	17–16	7–9	7th	–
2010–2011	Clifford Reed Jr.	21–13	13–3	1st	NIT
2011–2012	Gravelle Craig	18–17	11–5	4th	–
2012–2013	Gravelle Craig	14–20	7–9	8th	–
2013–2014	Gravelle Craig	7–25	5–11	10th	–
2014–2015	Gravelle Craig	11–21	7–9	8th	–
2015–2016	Gravelle Craig	14–18	10–6	4th	–
2016–2017	Gravelle Craig	10–22	6–10	10th	–
2017–2018	Ryan Ridder	18–14	12–4	T–1st	–
2018–2019	Ryan Ridder	14–17	9–7	5th	–
2019–2020	Ryan Ridder	16–14	10–6	4th	–
2020–2021	Ryan Ridder	0–0	0–0	N/A	–
2021–2022	Reggie Theus	9–21	7–11	10th	–
2022–2023	Reggie Theus	12–20	8–10	7th	–
2023–2024	Reggie Theus	17–17	11–7	5th	CBI
2024–2025	Reggie Theus	15–15	12–5	3rd	–

== Postseason results ==
=== NCAA Division II tournament results ===
The Wildcats have appeared in the NCAA Division II tournament three times. Their combined record is 0–6.

Year	Round	Opponent	Result
1965	Regional semifinals Regional 3rd-place game	Evansville; Norfolk State	L 77–116; L 74–91
1968	Regional semifinals Regional 3rd-place game	Union (TN); Oglethorpe	L 67–81; L 70–82
1980	Regional semifinals Regional 3rd-place game	Florida Southern; West Georgia	L 72–81; L 62–75

=== NAIA tournament results ===
The Wildcats have appeared in the NAIA tournament one time. Their record is 0–1.

Year	Round	Opponent	Result
1966	First Round	Carroll	L 88–91

=== NIT results ===
The Wildcats have appeared in one National Invitation Tournament (NIT). Their record is 0–1.

Year	Round	Opponent	Result
2011	First Round	Virginia Tech	L 54–79

=== CBI results ===
The Wildcats have appeared in the College Basketball Invitational (CBI) once in 2024. Their combined record is 0–1.

Year	Round	Opponent	Result
2024	First Round	Arkansas State	L 85–86

== Notable players ==
- Kevin Bradshaw, NCAA basketball record-holder for points in a single game, player in the Israeli Basketball Premier League
- John Chaney, 41st-winningest men's basketball coach
- Cy McClairen, former player, Bethune–Cookman's winningest head coach, and athletic director
- Carl Fuller, drafted into the ABA in the 7th round by the St. Louis Hawks
- Johnny Allen, drafted into the ABA in the 4th round by the San Diego Rockets
- Sam Barber, drafted into the ABA in the 16th round by the Boston Celtics
